= Iridium compounds =

Oxidation states (Note: Most common oxidation states of iridium are in bold. The right column lists one representative compound for each oxidation state.)
−3	[Ir(CO)_{3}]^{3−}
−1	[Ir(CO)_{3}(PPh_{3})]^{1−}
0	Ir_{4}(CO)_{12}
+1	[IrCl(CO)(PPh_{3})_{2}]
+2	Ir(C_{5}H_{5})_{2}
+3	IrCl_{3}
+4	IrO_{2}
+5	Ir_{4}F_{20}
+6	IrF_{6}
+7	[Ir(O_{2})O_{2}]^{+}
+8	IrO_{4}
+9	[IrO_{4}]^{+}

Iridium compounds are compounds containing the element iridium (Ir). Iridium forms compounds in oxidation states between −3 and +9, but the most common oxidation states are +1, +2, +3, and +4. Well-characterized compounds containing iridium in the +6 oxidation state include IrF_{6} and the oxides Sr_{2}MgIrO_{6} and Sr_{2}CaIrO_{6}. iridium(VIII) oxide (IrO_{4}) was generated under matrix isolation conditions at 6 K in argon. The highest oxidation state (+9), which is also the highest recorded for any element, is found in gaseous [IrO_{4}]^{+}.

== Oxides ==
Only one binary oxide is well-characterized: Iridium dioxide, IrO_{2}. It is a blue-black solid. The compound adopts the TiO_{2} rutile structure, featuring six coordinate iridium and three coordinate oxygen. It adopts the fluorite structure. A sesquioxide, Ir_{2}O_{3}, has been described as a blue-black powder, which is oxidized to IrO_{2} by HNO_{3}. The corresponding disulfides, diselenides, sesquisulfides, and sesquiselenides are known, as well as IrS_{3}.

Another oxide, iridium tetroxide, is also known, with iridium in the +8 oxiation state. This compound was formed by photochemical rearrangement of [(η^{1}-O_{2})IrO_{2}] in solid argon at a temperature of 6 K (−267.15 °C; −448.87 °F). At higher temperatures, the oxide is unstable. The detection of the iridium tetroxide cation IrO^{+}_{4} by infrared photodissociation spectroscopy with formal oxidation state +9 has been reported, the highest currently known of any element, though the +10 oxidation state has been theorized for platinum, but not confirmed.

== Halides ==
Binary trihalides, IrX_{3} are known for all of the halogens. For oxidation states +4 and above, only the tetrafluoride, pentafluoride and hexafluoride are known. Iridium hexafluoride, IrF_{6}, is a volatile yellow solid, composed of octahedral molecules. It decomposes in water and is reduced to IrF_{4},. Iridium pentafluoride is also a strong oxidant, but it is a tetramer, Ir_{4}F_{20}, formed by four corner-sharing octahedra.

== Complexes ==
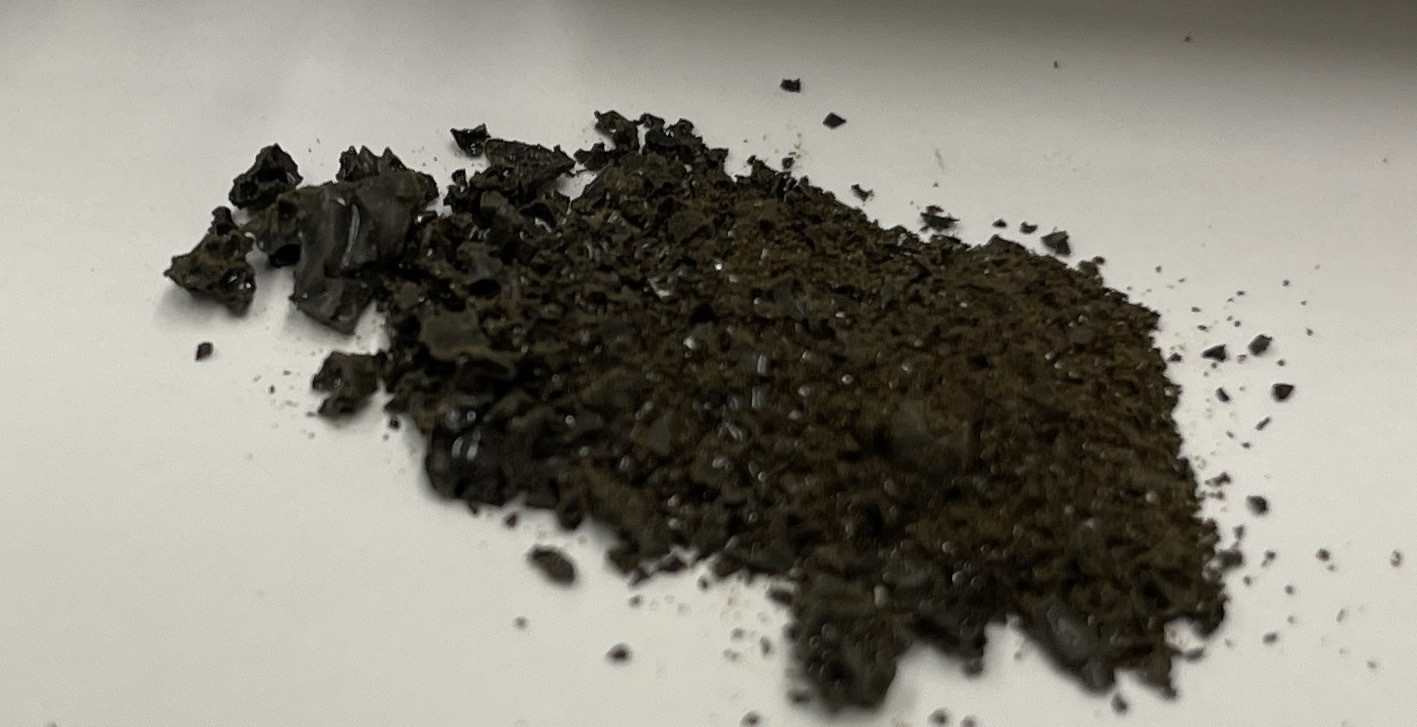
Hydrated iridium trichloride, a common salt of iridium.

The coordination complexes of iridium are extensive.

Iridium in its complexes is always low-spin. Ir(III) and Ir(IV) generally form octahedral complexes. Polyhydride complexes are known for the +5 and +3 oxidation states. One example is IrH_{5}(P^{i}Pr_{3})_{2}. The ternary hydride Mg_{6}Ir_{2}H_{11} is believed to contain both the IrH^{4−}_{5} and the 18-electron IrH^{5−}_{4} anion.

Iridium also oxyanions with oxidation states +4 and +5. K_{2}IrO_{3} and KIrO_{3} can be prepared from the reaction of potassium oxide or potassium superoxide with iridium at high temperatures. Such solids are not soluble in conventional solvents.

As for many elements, the chlorides are key complexes. Hexachloroiridic(IV) acid, H_{2}IrCl_{6}, and its ammonium salt are the most common iridium compounds from an industrial and preparative perspectives. They are intermediates in the purification of iridium and used as precursors for most other iridium compounds, as well as in the preparation of anode coatings. The IrCl^{2−}_{6} ion has an intense dark brown color, and can be readily reduced to the lighter-colored IrCl^{3−}_{6} and vice versa. Iridium trichloride, IrCl_{3}, which can be obtained in anhydrous form from direct oxidation of iridium powder by chlorine at 650 °C, or in hydrated form by dissolving Ir_{2}O_{3} in hydrochloric acid, is often used as a starting material for the synthesis of other Ir(III) compounds. Another compound used as a starting material is ammonium hexachloroiridate(III), (NH_{4})_{3}IrCl_{6}.

In the presence of air, iridium metal dissolves in molten alkali-metal cyanides to produce the Ir(CN)^{3−}_{6} (hexacyanoiridate) ion.

== Oxyanions ==
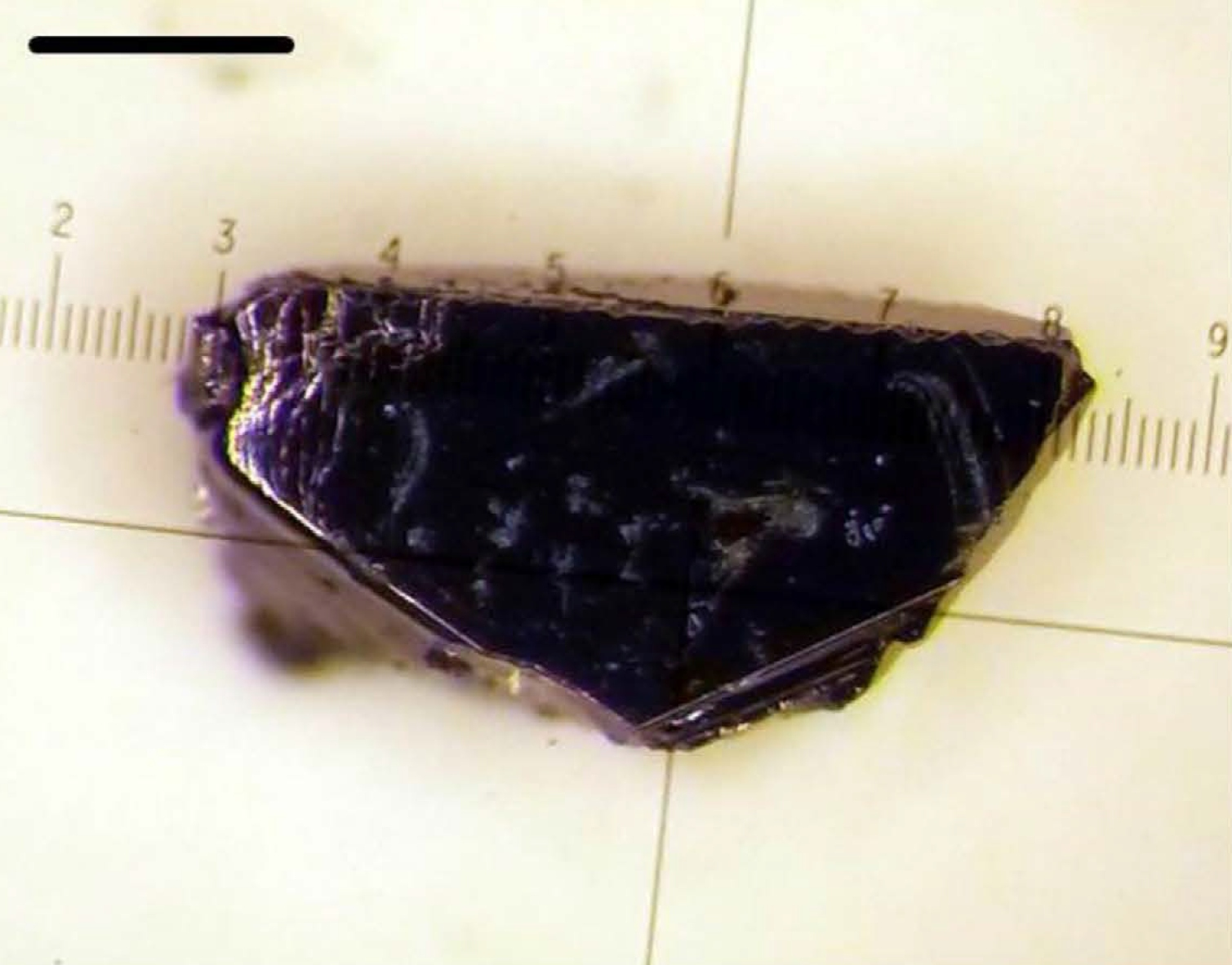
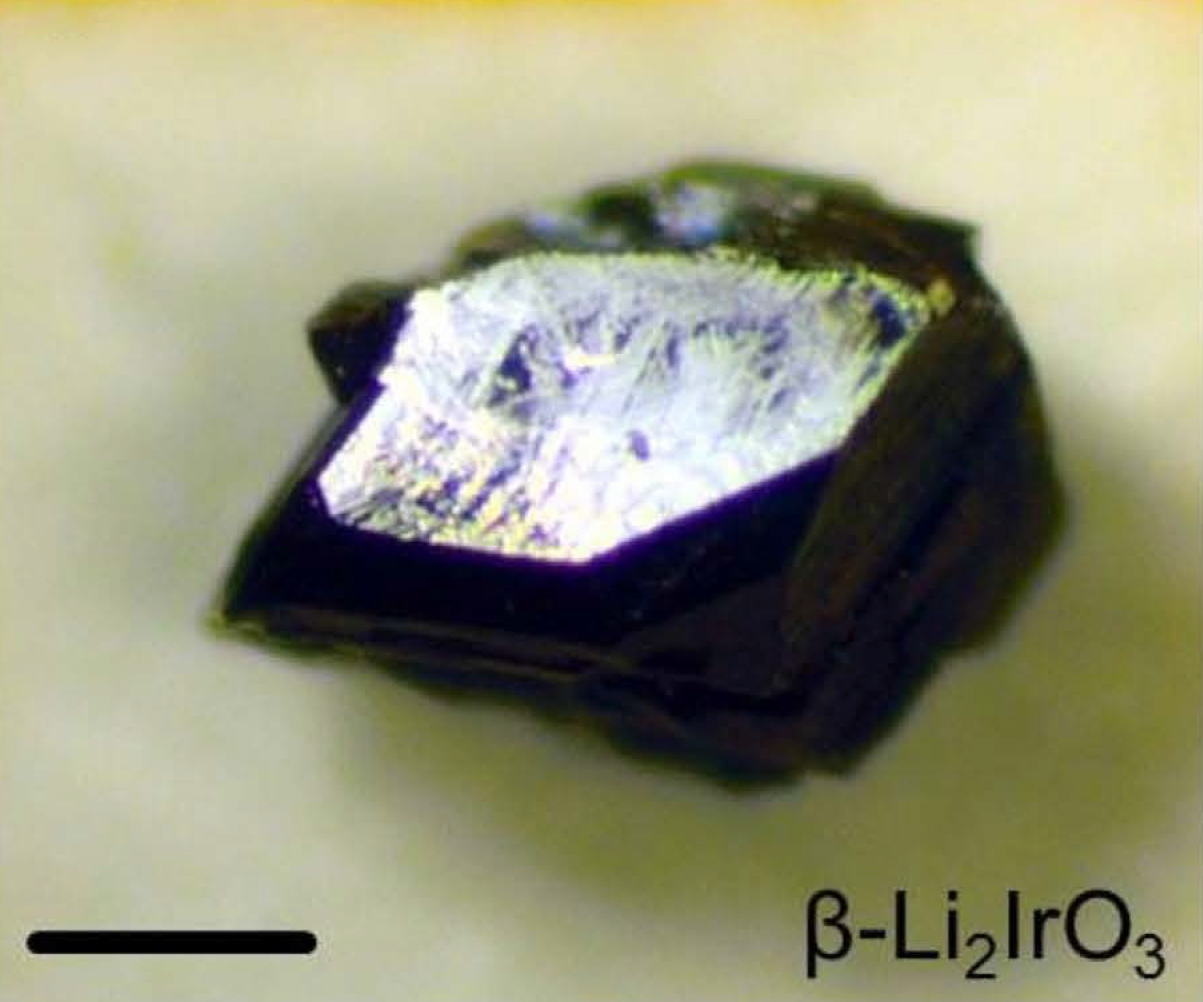
α-Li_{2}IrO_{3} (scale bar 0.3 mm) (left) β-Li_{2}IrO_{3} (scale bar 0.2 mm) (right)

Iridium forms oxyanions in the +4 oxidation state. It forms compounds such as lithium iridate (Li_{2}IrO_{3}), which forms black crystals with three slightly different layered atomic structures, α, β, and sometimes γ. Lithium iridate exhibits metal-like, temperature-independent electrical conductivity, and changes its magnetic ordering from paramagnetic to antiferromagnetic upon cooling to 15 K. Lithium iridate is a potential electrode material for the lithium-ion battery. This application is hindered by the high costs of Ir, as compared to the cheaper Li_{2}MnO_{3} alternative.

== Organoiridium chemistry ==
Cyclooctadiene iridium chloride dimer is a common complex of Ir(I).

Organoiridium compounds contain iridium–carbon bonds. Early studies identified the very stable tetrairidium dodecacarbonyl, Ir_{4}(CO)_{12}. In this compound, each of the iridium atoms is bonded to the other three, forming a tetrahedral cluster. The discovery of Vaska's complex (IrCl(CO)[P(C_{6}H_{5})_{3}]_{2}) opened the door for oxidative addition reactions, a process fundamental to useful reactions. For example, Crabtree's catalyst, a homogeneous catalyst for hydrogenation reactions. Iridium is usually supplied commercially in the Ir(III) and Ir(IV) oxidation states. Important starting reagents being hydrated iridium trichloride and ammonium hexachloroiridate. These salts are reduced upon treatment with CO, hydrogen, and alkenes. Illustrative is the carbonylation of the trichloride:

IrCl_{3}(H_{2}O)_{x} + 3 CO → [Ir(CO)_{2}Cl_{2}]^{−} + CO_{2} + 2 H^{+} + Cl^{−} + (x-1) H_{2}O

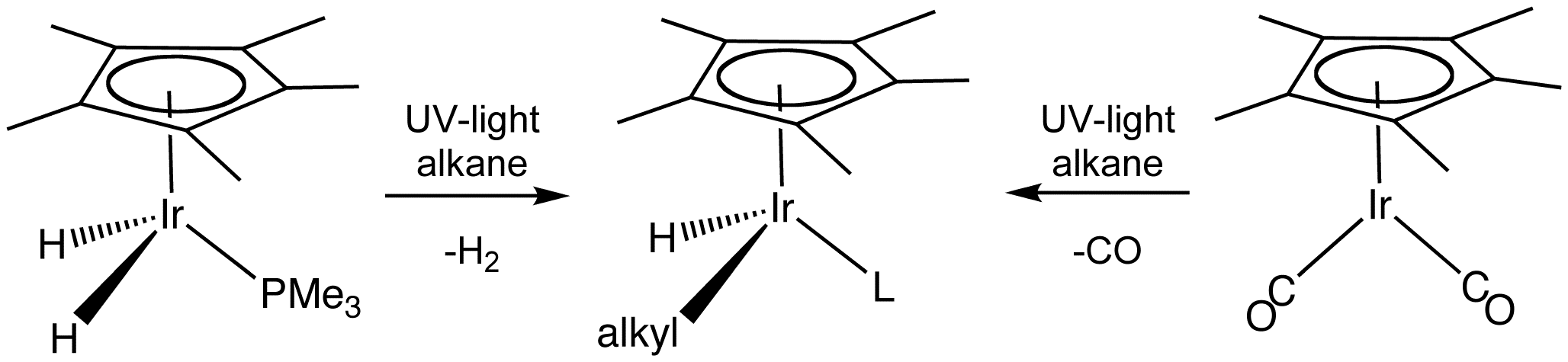
Oxidative addition to hydrocarbons in organoiridium chemistry

Many organoiridium(III) compounds are generated from pentamethylcyclopentadienyl iridium dichloride dimer. Many of derivatives feature kinetically inert cyclometalated ligands. Related half-sandwich complexes were central in the development of C-H activation.

Iridium complexes played a pivotal role in the development of carbon–hydrogen bond activation (C–H activation), which promises to allow functionalization of hydrocarbons, which are traditionally regarded as unreactive.

== See also ==
- Cobalt compounds
- Rhodium compounds
