= Iridium fluoride =

Iridium fluoride may refer to:

- Iridium(III) fluoride, IrF_{3}
- Iridium(IV) fluoride, IrF_{4}
- Iridium(V) fluoride, IrF_{5}
- Iridium(VI) fluoride, IrF_{6}, or iridium hexafluoride
