= Iridium trifluoride =

Names
- Other names Iridium(III) fluoride, trifluoroiridium

Identifiers
CAS Number	23370-59-4
3D model (JSmol)	Interactive image
ChemSpider	14462017
PubChem CID	19886946
- InChI: InChI=1S/3FH.Ir/h3*1H;/q;;;+3/p-3 Key: VNCUSYIKPZQFST-UHFFFAOYSA-K
- SMILES: [Ir+3].[F-].[F-].[F-]

Properties
Chemical formula	F_{3}Ir
Molar mass	249.212 g·mol^{−1}
Appearance	black crystals
Density	8 g/cm^{3}
Melting point	250 °C decomposes
Solubility in water	insoluble

Structure
Crystal structure	hexagonal

Related compounds
Related compounds	Rhodium trifluoride Ruthenium trifluoride
- Except where otherwise noted, data are given for materials in their standard state (at 25 °C [77 °F], 100 kPa). Infobox references

Iridium trifluoride is a binary chemical compound of iridium and fluorine with the chemical formula IrF_{3}.

== Synthesis ==
Reduction of iridium hexafluoride by metallic iridium:

2IrF_{6} + Ir → 2IrF_{3}

Decomposition of iridium tetrafluoride by heating at 430–450 °C:

2IrF_{4} → 2IrF_{3} + F_{2}
