= Iridium(IV) oxide =

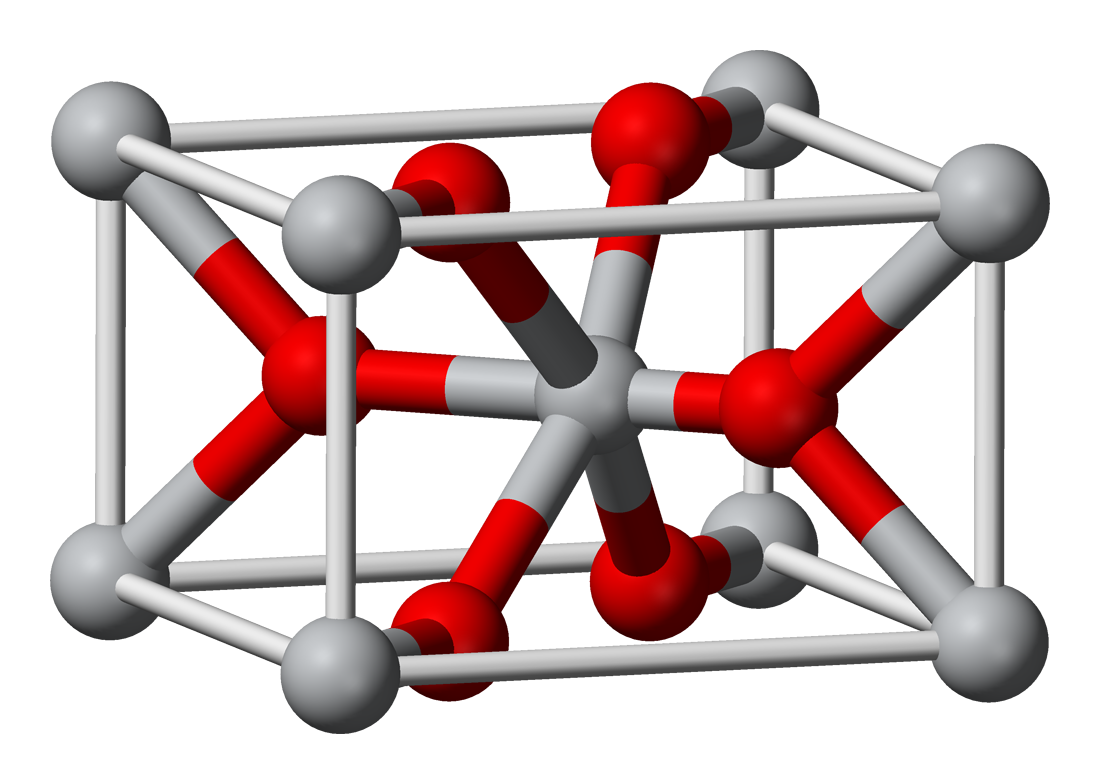

Names
- Other names Iridium dioxide

Identifiers
CAS Number	12030-49-8
3D model (JSmol)	Interactive image
ChemSpider	10605808
ECHA InfoCard	100.031.572
PubChem CID	82821
UNII	CL6CQW9MWS
CompTox Dashboard (EPA)	DTXSID1051222
- InChI: InChI=1S/Ir.2O/q+4;2*-2 Key: NSTASKGZCMXIET-UHFFFAOYSA-N; InChI=1/Ir.2O/q+4;2*-2 Key: NSTASKGZCMXIET-UHFFFAOYAQ
- SMILES: [Ir+4].[O-2].[O-2]

Properties
Chemical formula	IrO_{2}
Molar mass	224.22 g/mol
Appearance	blue-black solid
Density	11.66 g/cm^{3}
Melting point	1,100 °C (2,010 °F; 1,370 K) decomposes
Solubility in water	insoluble
Magnetic susceptibility (χ)	+224.0·10^{−6} cm^{3}/mol

Structure
Crystal structure	Rutile (tetragonal)
Coordination geometry	Octahedral (Ir); Trigonal (O)

Hazards
- GHS labelling
Pictograms	(GHS03: Oxidizing)
Signal word	Danger
Hazard statements	H272, H413
Precautionary statements	P210, P220, P273, P280, P370+P378, P501
Flash point	Non-flammable

Related compounds
Other anions	Iridium(IV) fluoride; Iridium disulfide
Other cations	Rhodium dioxide; Osmium dioxide; Platinum dioxide
- Except where otherwise noted, data are given for materials in their standard state (at 25 °C [77 °F], 100 kPa). verify (what is ?) Infobox references

Iridium(IV) oxide, IrO_{2}, is the only well-characterised oxide of iridium. It is a blue-black solid, used with other rare oxides to coat anodes.

== Structure ==
The compound adopts the TiO_{2} rutile structure, featuring six coordinate iridium and three coordinate oxygen. It forms a tetragonal lattice with lattice parameters of 4.5Å and 3.15Å.

== Mechanical properties ==
Iridium oxide does not easily deform under stress, instead cracking easily. Measured deflections of a thin, cantilevered iridium oxide film indicate a Young’s modulus of 300 ± 15 GPa, substantially lower than the Young's modulus of metallic iridium (517 GPa).

== Synthesis ==
As described by its discoverers, it can be formed by treating the green form of iridium trichloride with oxygen at high temperatures:

2 IrCl_{3} + 2 O_{2} → 2 IrO_{2} + 3 Cl_{2}

A hydrated form is also known.

== Applications ==
Iridium dioxide can be used to make coated electrodes for industrial electrolysis or as microelectrodes for electrophysiology. In electrolytic applications, IrO_{2} films evolve O_{2} efficiently.

Electrode manufacture typically requires high-temperature annealing.

Fracture and delamination are well-known problems when fabricating devices that incorporate iridium oxide film. One cause of delamination is lattice mismatch between iridium oxide and the substrate. Sputtering iridium oxide on a liquid crystal polymer has been proposed to avoid mismatch, but sputtered films spontaneously delaminate during cyclic voltammetry if the maximum potential bias exceeds 0.9 V.

=== Iridium Oxide in Water Electrolysis ===
==== Electrocatalytic Applications ====
Iridium (IV) oxide (IrO_{2}) is used as an electrocatalyst for the oxygen evolution reaction (OER), particularly in proton exchange membrane water electrolysis (PEMWE), a technology used to generate hydrogen through the electrochemical splitting of water. Among water electrolysis technologies, such as alkaline water electrolysis and solid oxide electrolysis, PEMWE has attracted interest for large-scale hydrogen production because it can be powered by renewable energy sources such as wind turbines and solar panels. IrO_{2} is particularly relevant to this technology due to its stability under the acidic and oxidative conditions encountered at the anode.

A PEMWE cell contains a membrane electrode assembly (MEA), which includes a proton exchange membrane along with the cathode and anode catalyst layers. The hydrogen evolution reaction occurs at the cathode, while the slower oxygen evolution reaction (OER), a four-electron-transfer process, takes place at the anode. IrO_{2} catalysts are pursued primarily as anode materials for improving OER performance. In contrast, ruthenium (IV) oxide (RuO_{2}), a major alternative to IrO_{2} for acidic OER, generally exhibits higher catalytic activity but lower stability. IrO_{2} can survive longer than RuO_{2} in the harsh acidic conditions of PEMWE, which also offers advantages such as high current densities and efficient product separation.

Multiple models of iridium demand over the next few decades project substantial quantities of Ir required to support the expansion of renewable hydrogen production. However, iridium (Ir) is one of the scarcest elements on Earth, having an extremely low occurrence of nearly three parts per trillion in the Earth's crust. Therefore, considerable research has focused on improving iridium utilization, often evaluated using iridium-specific power density (Ir-PD), which measures the mass of iridium required per unit of electrolyzer power capacity, typically expressed in milligrams of iridium per watt (mg Ir/W). To make these projections more attainable, researchers have explored ways to decrease Ir-PD through improved catalyst design and OER performance.

=== Catalyst Design and Nanostructuring ===
Due to the global scarcity of iridium, research on iridium oxide electrocatalysts has focused on reducing the amount of iridium within the actual catalyst while maintaining catalytic performance, including by increasing the surface-to-volume ratio. One strategy is to alloy or dope the iridium catalyst with more abundant and less expensive transition metals, such as nickel, molybdenum, or cobalt. Another major approach is to introduce a support onto which IrO_{2} can be deposited, increasing the accessibility of active sites on the catalyst surface. These supports stabilize highly dispersed iridium oxide nanoparticles and help minimize agglomeration. High electrical conductivity, large surface area, and stability in highly acidic environments are desirable properties of support materials. Several categories of support materials have received much attention:

==== Carbon-based Supports ====
Carbon-based supports can provide high electrical conductivity and larger and more accessible surface areas. Notably, graphene has demonstrated improved stability in certain supported iridium catalyst systems. However, the resistance of carbon supports to oxidation under OER conditions remains a concern.

==== Metal Carbides ====
Metal carbides can exhibit favorable chemical and mechanical stability, surface area, and electrical conductivity. Tantalum carbide-supported Ir catalysts have demonstrated particularly high OER performance.

Figure 1. Illustration of Ir-supported catalysts: The development of various proposed iridium nanoparticle materials able to withstand the OER conditions in acidic PEMWE.

==== Metal Oxides ====
Certain metal oxides have high thermodynamic stability under oxidative conditions but can have poor conductivity. Incorporating more abundant elements, such as metal dopants, can also reduce material costs. Various doped tin oxides have been shown to improve OER performance, yet the stability of doped supports remains uncertain. Specifically, Sb-doped SnO_{2} (ATO) showed very high activity with crystalline IrO_{2} nanoparticles. Additionally, titanium dioxide (TiO_{2}) and certain doped titanium oxides can be stable under harsh acidic conditions and oxidative environments, but their limited conductivity can present challenges for catalytic performance.

==== Metal Nitrides ====
Metal nitrides have exhibited high conductivity and potential resistance to oxidation as well as increased OER activity. Despite these benefits, a high Ir loading was required in some investigated systems to compete with the performance of unsupported Ir-based catalysts.

==== Nanostructure and Catalytic Activity ====
Strategies to improve the OER performance of iridium-based catalysts have been explored alongside efforts to reduce Ir loading. Overall, researchers have moved towards creating nanostructured iridium oxide catalysts due to the potential for fine-tuning their characteristics, such as crystallinity, porosity, defects, bond strength, and bond length. OER performance is influenced by electrochemically active surface area (EASA), the exposure of active sites, and their intrinsic activity. Nanostructures such as nanotubes have shown good activity and durability in harsh acidic conditions.

Notable nanostructure synthesis methods for IrO_{2} include Adams’ fusion method, hydrothermal synthesis, stabilizer-free wet chemical synthesis, and chemical bath deposition. Complementary techniques, such as capping-agent stabilization and template-assisted synthesis, can regulate morphology and crystallinity.

Morphology is one aspect of IrO_{2} that can be modified to increase the number of accessible active sites, including through porosity; one strategy to achieve this as well as incorporate less iridium is through dealloying. Methods such as hydrogen-induced co-electrodeposition can be utilized to make an iridium alloy precursor. A component can then be selectively removed through electrochemical dissolution. For example, an IrNi alloy was made, and Ni was removed, resulting in a porous nanostructured Ir-containing catalyst. It had a high density of accessible active sites, and the process could modify the electronic and geometric properties of the resulting iridium-based catalyst, which could also enhance OER.

Crystal structure and crystallinity can greatly impact OER activity. Studies have found that amorphous or low-crystallinity iridium oxides often have higher catalytic activity than highly crystallized IrO_{2} structures, but crystalline catalysts, especially rutile ones, are generally more stable than amorphous ones, although this relationship is not universal. Amorphous hydrated iridium oxides may exhibit higher concentrations of oxygen vacancies and lower average Ir oxidation states, which may contribute to their instability compared to rutile IrO_{2}. Their lower initial oxidation states may allow for easier oxidation during OER, which can promote dissolution. The higher activity of amorphous iridium oxides has been associated with greater accessible surface area, but the underlying reasons for their enhanced intrinsic activity are not yet fully understood.

Figure 2. Crystal structure of perovskite oxides (ABO₃).

Beyond IrO_{2}, other iridium-containing oxides have also been investigated as OER catalysts. One such category is perovskites. Examples include the double perovskites Sr_{2}CaIrO_{6}, Sr_{2}MgIrO_{6}, and Sr_{2}ZnIrO_{6} in the form of A_{2}BB’O_{6}. These compounds have demonstrated increased intrinsic activity at iridium sites and promising stability.

Other perovskites, such as single perovskites and other double perovskite oxides, have also shown favorable catalytic activity and structural stability. In the general perovskite formula ABO_{3}, iridium can occupy the B-site, while alkaline earth metals and rare-earth metals can be utilized for the A-site to decrease Ir loading and the overall cost of scarce materials.

Figure 3. Crystal structure of pyrochlore oxides (A₂B₂O₇).

Pyrochlores represent another well-studied crystal structure for OER. Certain iridium-containing pyrochlores have shown favorable activity and stability, offering another approach to reducing Ir utilization.

=== Oxygen Evolution Reaction Mechanisms ===
DFT calculations, kinetic analysis, as well as various characterization techniques have been used to examine numerous potential mechanisms of OER on iridium (IV) oxide. Two commonly used tools for analyzing OER activity and kinetics are the volcano plot and the Tafel slope, the latter of which provides insight into electrochemical reaction kinetics. Neither independently establishes a specific reaction mechanism. Reaction pathways can depend on the reaction environment, such as electrolyte pH and applied electrode potential, both of which can impact the surface state of the catalyst. These mechanisms provide insight into how the surface chemistry of iridium oxide influences its catalytic behavior. The most widely discussed pathways can be broadly divided into two categories: adsorbate-based and lattice oxygen-based mechanisms.

==== Adsorbate Evolution Mechanism (AEM) ====
AEM is one of the most widely studied mechanisms of OER, with DFT calculations describing a sequence of four proton-coupled electron-transfer steps. Water reacts with an active site of the IrO_{2} surface, forming an adsorbed *OH intermediate through proton-coupled electron transfer (PCET). This intermediate undergoes oxidation and deprotonation to form *O, which then reacts with a water molecule to form an adsorbed *OOH intermediate, followed by an oxidation step that releases O_{2} and regenerates the active site, completing the catalytic cycle. Depending on the applied electrode potential, surface iridium can undergo changes in oxidation state during the reaction. Evidence also supports alternative pathways involving two adjacent *O species that can combine to release O_{2}.

==== Binuclear Peroxo Mechanism (BPM) ====
In the pathway described by Gao et al., the binuclear peroxo mechanism (BPM), also referred to as the oxide path mechanism (OPM), involves a sequence of four proton-electron transfer steps that proceed through surface-adsorbed intermediates. While AEM primarily involves surface iridium sites, BPM involves the direct participation of surface oxygen in the reaction. In this proposed pathway, oxygen species associated with neighboring iridium sites combine to form an oxygen-containing intermediate through multiple proton-electron transfers, ultimately releasing O_{2} and regenerating the catalyst surface.

==== Lattice Oxygen Mechanism (LOM) ====
Sometimes discussed in connection with the lattice oxygen evolving reaction (LOER) mechanism, LOM has been proposed under certain OER conditions, including high anodic potentials. Unlike AEM, LOM involves lattice oxygen atoms participating directly in O_{2} evolution. Two variants have been suggested, differing in whether one or two lattice oxygen atoms contribute to the release of O_{2}.

Figure 4. Schematic illustrating a) the adsorbate evolution mechanism (AEM), b) the lattice oxygen mechanism (LOM), and c) a mechanism connecting the OER to potential routes for Ir dissolution.

In the first proposed pathway, two lattice oxygen atoms participate in O_{2} formation, creating oxygen vacancies that are subsequently replenished by oxygen atoms from water.

In the second proposed pathway, one lattice oxygen atom combines with an oxygen atom originating from water to form O_{2}. Water then supplies oxygen to fill the resulting lattice vacancy.

==== Other Proposed Mechanisms ====
The double oxygen coupling mechanism (DOCM) is similar to AEM, but two neighboring Ir sites develop *O intermediates, which couple directly, bypassing the *OOH intermediate. A related mechanism, called the quadruple oxygen coupling mechanism (QOCM), has also been reported. Naito et al. also describe alternative AEM-derived pathways involving changes in the oxidation states and electronic structures of surface iridium and oxygen species. The tetraoxidane mechanism (TOM), introduced by Exner et al., includes an intermediate containing a chain of four oxygen atoms, enabling O_{2} production without removing an oxygen atom from the catalyst lattice.

=== Catalyst Stability and Degradation ===
One factor that strongly influences OER performance of electrocatalysts is stability. There is an experimentally observed inverse relationship between activity and structural stability in many iridium-based catalysts, which hinders the development of viable catalysts. This relationship has been attributed to factors such as the nature of metal cations and the density of surface defects. Therefore, a balance between activity and stability is desired; iridium is among the few metals that can withstand harsh, acidic, and oxidative conditions, while also maintaining high activity. However, even iridium is susceptible to oxidation and dissolution within this environment, which can reduce catalyst loading and OER performance over time. Specifically, the catalyst can degrade through electrochemical dissolution and mechanical detachment or erosion of nanostructures. Although lattice oxygen participation can aid OER activity in certain proposed mechanisms, it may also promote catalyst instability and dissolution.

Catalyst stability can be evaluated through electrochemical measurements, such as chronopotentiometry and chronoamperometry, which monitor changes in potential at constant current density and current density at constant potential, respectively. An increase in potential or a decline in current density over time can indicate catalyst degradation. Additionally, techniques such as inductively coupled plasma mass spectrometry (ICP-MS) can be used to measure dissolved iridium.

Beyond crystal structure and morphology, dissolution of hydrous IrO_{2} also depends on the electrode potential and the thickness of the oxide layer. As OER continues, the proton concentration in the oxide pores can increase, possibly accelerating dissolution. Lattice oxygen participation can also contribute to dissolution through oxygen-vacancy formation and changes in the catalyst structure. Additionally, the ratio of edge-sharing to corner-sharing structural connections impacts dissolution, with a greater proportion of corner-sharing connections associated with enhanced iridium dissolution.

Binninger et al. suggest a thermodynamic coupling between OER, lattice oxygen evolution (LOER), and metal dissolution, linking the stability of metal oxides under OER conditions to lattice oxygen redox reactions. They describe the LOER mechanism, in which lattice oxygen atoms participate directly in O₂ formation, possibly alongside water-derived oxygen, creating vacancies that can contribute to catalyst instability and dissolution. These vacancies can be replaced by water-derived oxygen or through migration from the bulk lattice, although this exchange can still lead to destabilization of the surface.

However, evidence has shown that RuO_{2}, another OER catalyst, exhibits little lattice oxygen incorporation in O_{2} evolution under certain conditions. Other studies have identified oxide systems with high oxygen-vacancy formation energies, making vacancy formation unfavorable and limiting lattice oxygen participation in OER.

Proposed dissolution pathways involve changes in iridium oxidation state and the formation of intermediates, including IrO_{2}OH, IrO_{3}, and Ir(OH)_{3}. The stability and dissolution behavior of these species can vary with electrode potential, which may influence catalyst degradation. Following dissolution, iridium species can be redeposited on the catalyst surface, which may contribute to surface restructuring and changes in stability. Accordingly, oxidation state has a substantial effect on how OER performance changes over time.
