= Iridium(III) chloride =

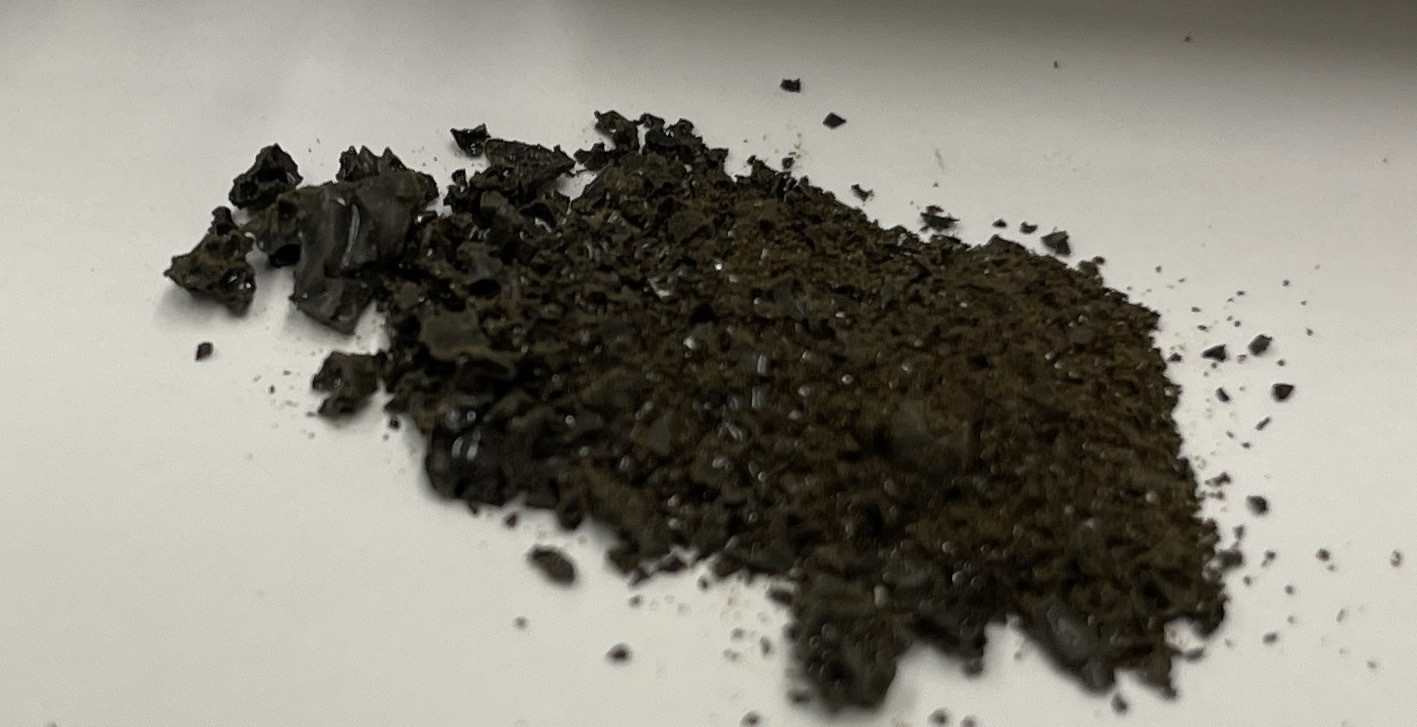
- Iridium(III) chloride trihydrate Trihydrate

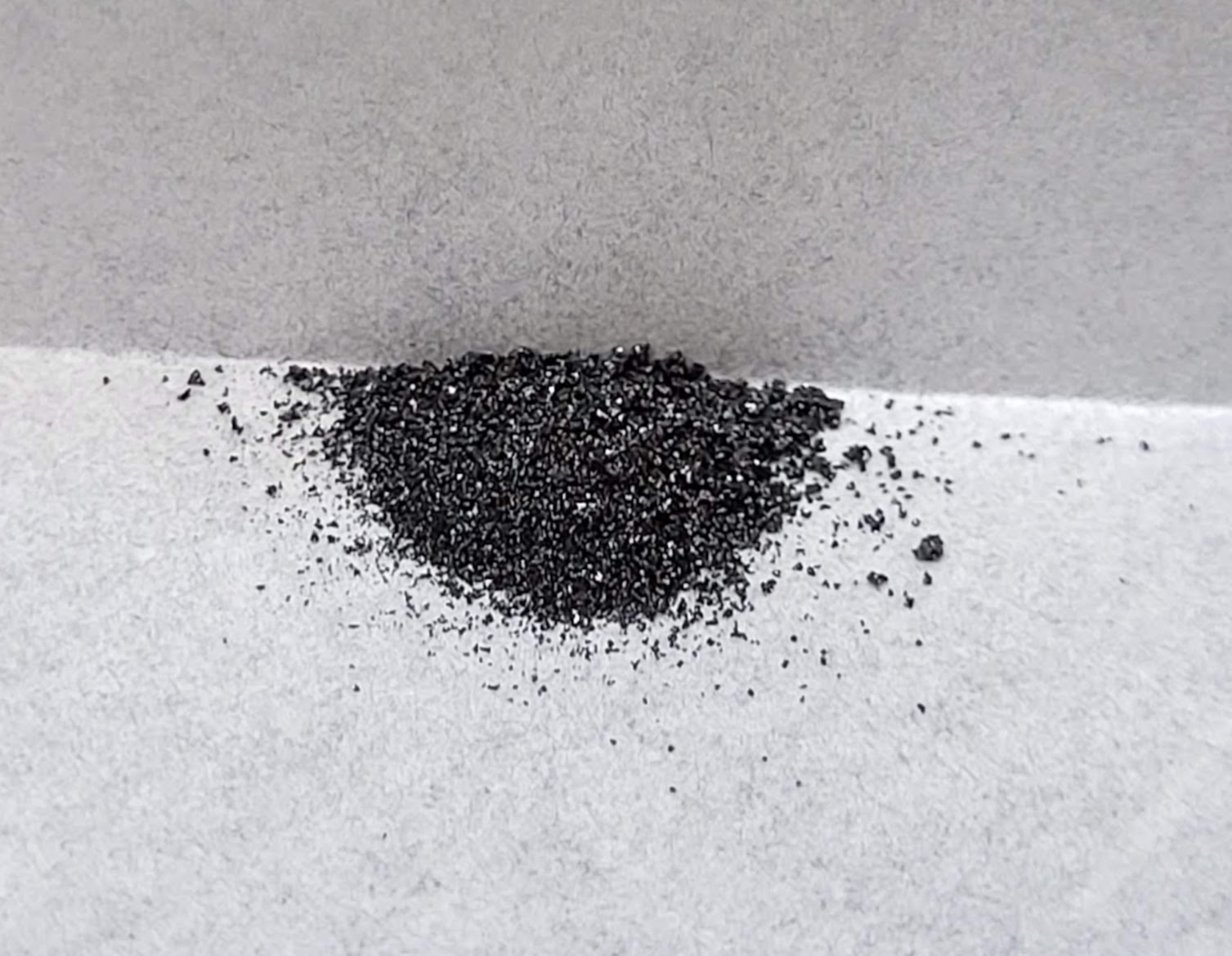
- Iridium(III) chloride anhydrous α-anhydrous

Names
- Other names Iridium trichloride

Identifiers
CAS Number	10025-83-9 (anhydrous); 14996-61-3 (hydrate)
3D model (JSmol)	Interactive image
ChemSpider	23837
ECHA InfoCard	100.030.028
EC Number	233-044-6
PubChem CID	25563
UNII	20278OEG45
CompTox Dashboard (EPA)	DTXSID10275787
- InChI: InChI=1S/3ClH.Ir/h3*1H;/q;;;+3/p-3 Key: DANYXEHCMQHDNX-UHFFFAOYSA-K
- SMILES: [Cl-].[Cl-].[Cl-].[Ir+3]

Properties
Chemical formula	IrCl_{3}
Molar mass	298.58 g/mol (anhydrous) 316.60 g/mol (hydrate)
Appearance	brown solid (α-anhydrous) red solid (β-anhydrous) dark green solid (trihydrate)
Density	5.30 g/cm^{3}, solid
Melting point	763 °C (1,405 °F; 1,036 K) (decomposes)
Solubility in water	insoluble (anhydrous IrCl_{3}), soluble (hydrated derivative)
Solubility	Insoluble in HCl and alkanes
Magnetic susceptibility (χ)	−14.4·10^{−6} cm^{3}/mol

Structure
Crystal structure	Monoclinic, mS16
Space group	C12/m1, No. 12

Thermochemistry
Std enthalpy of formation (Δ_{f}H^{⦵}_{298})	−257 kJ/mol

Hazards
- GHS labelling
Pictograms	(GHS07: Exclamation mark) (GHS09: Environmental hazard)
Signal word	Warning
Hazard statements	H302, H315, H319, H335, H411
Precautionary statements	P261, P264, P264+P265, P270, P271, P273, P280, P301+P317, P302+P352, P304+P340, P305+P351+P338, P319, P321, P330, P332+P317, P337+P317, P362+P364, P391, P403+P233, P405, P501
Flash point	non-flammable

Related compounds
Other cations	Rhodium(III) chloride
Related compounds	Platinum(II) chloride
- Except where otherwise noted, data are given for materials in their standard state (at 25 °C [77 °F], 100 kPa). verify (what is ?) Infobox references

Iridium(III) chloride is the inorganic compound with the formula IrCl_{3}. The anhydrous compound is relatively rare. It has two polymorphs, α and β, which are brown and red colored respectively. The related trihydrate, IrCl_{3}(H_{2}O)_{3}, is hygroscopic, dark green, and much more commonly encountered, being a starting point for iridium chemistry.

== Preparation ==
Iridium is separated from the other platinum group metals as crystalline ammonium hexachloroiridate, (NH_{4})_{2}[IrCl_{6}], which can be reduced to iridium metal in a stream of hydrogen. The spongy Ir thus produced reacts with chlorine at 650 °C to give iridium(III) chloride.

Hydrated iridium trichloride is obtained by heating hydrated iridium(III) oxide with hydrochloric acid.

== Structure ==
Like the related rhodium compound, IrCl_{3} adopts the structure seen for aluminium chloride. This is the monoclinic α polymorph. A rhombohedral β polymorph also exists. Both polymorphs have effectively the same anion lattice but differ in the octahedral interstices the iridium ions occupy. The α polymorph converts to the β polymorph when heated to around 650 °C.

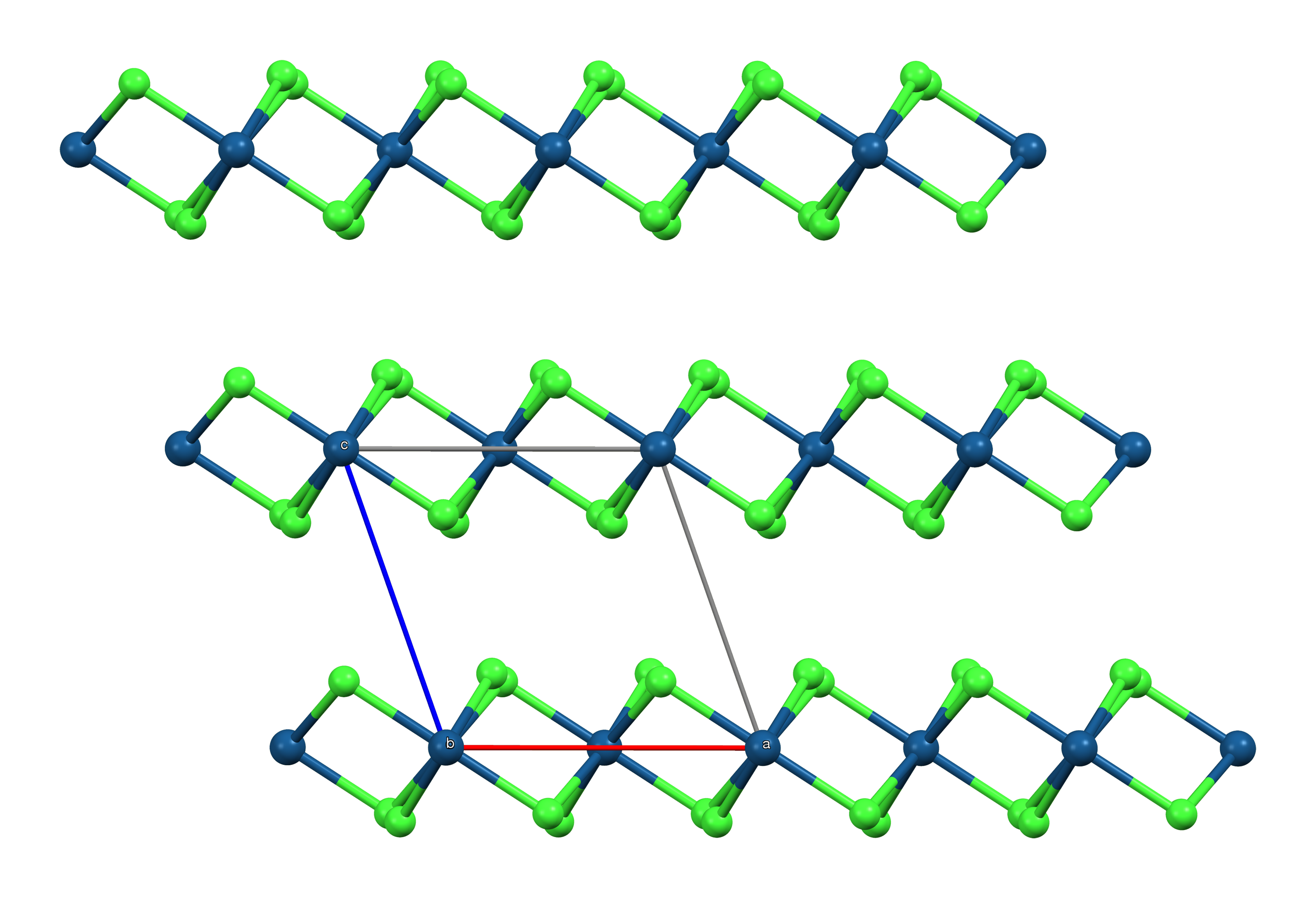
α-IrCl_{3}

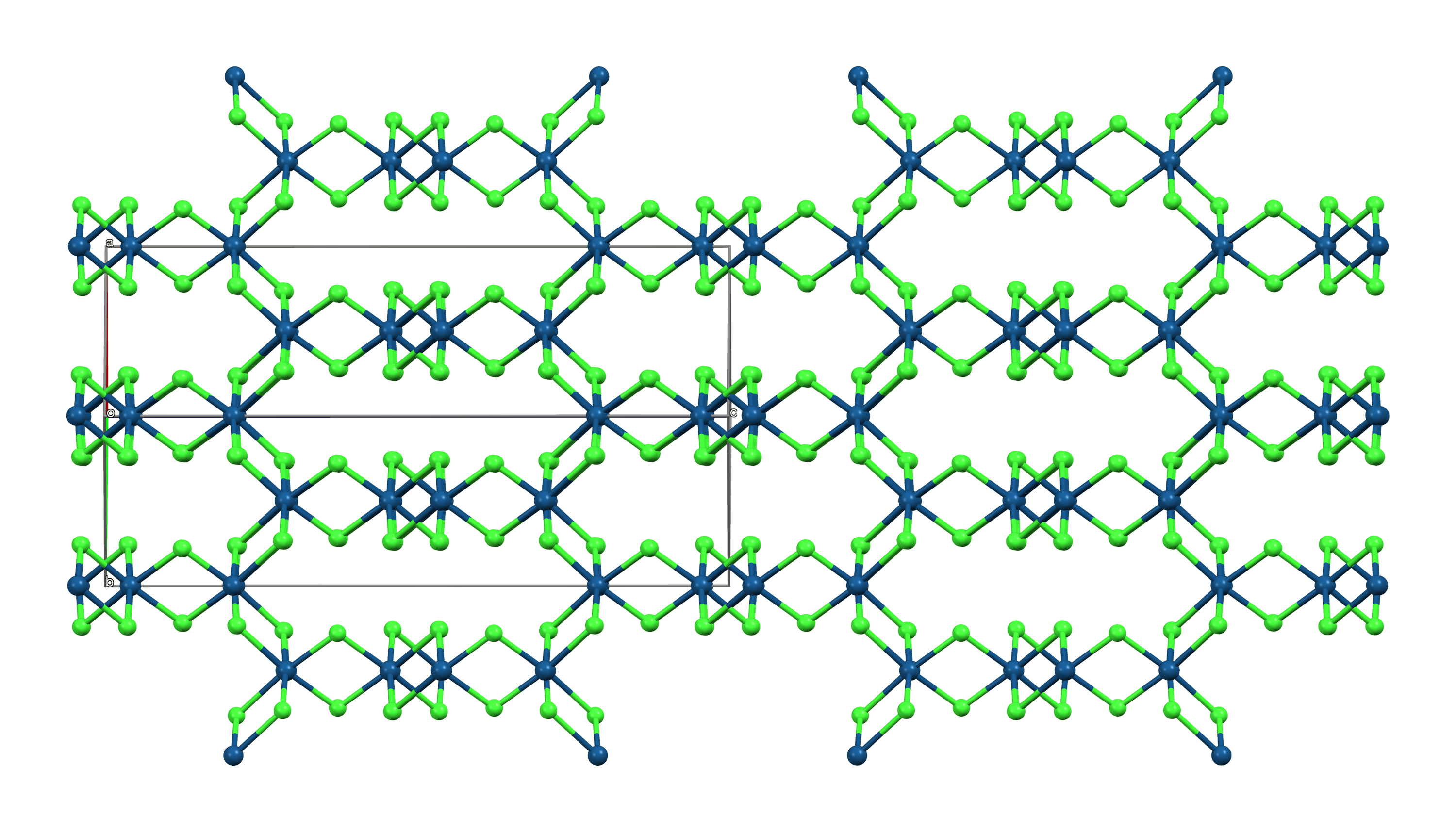
β-IrCl_{3}

Structures of the forms of iridium(III) chloride

Crystallographic data for the 2 polymorphs of iridium(III) chloride
Compound	α-IrCl_{3}	β-IrCl_{3}
Crystal Structure	Monoclinic	Orthorhombic
Space Group	C2/m	Fddd
Lattice constant a (Å)	5.99	6.95
Lattice constant b (Å)	10.37	9.81
Lattice constant c (Å)	5.99	20.82
β	109.4°	
Calculated density (g/cm^{3})	5.33	5.34

The structure of the trihydrate has not been elucidated yet.

== Reactions and uses ==
Industrially, most iridium complexes are generated from ammonium hexachloroiridate or the related chloroiridic acid (H_{2}IrCl_{6}). The Cativa process, source of most of the world's acetic acid relies on such catalysts.

Hydrated iridium(III) chloride is used in the preparation of other iridium complexes such as Vaska's complex, trans-[IrCl(CO)(PPh_{3})_{2}]. With the presence of the chloride anion, it forms hexachloroiridate(III), and produces hexachloroiridate(IV) in aqua regia. The trihydrate react with ammonia to form ammine complexes, such as pentaamminechloroiridium(III) chloride, formulated [IrCl(NH_{3})_{5}]Cl_{2}. It also reacts with concentrated ammonium hydroxide at 150 °C to form the fully ammoniated complex, [Ir(NH_{3})_{6}]Cl_{3}. The hydrate can also form complexes upon reaction with bipyridine, acetonitrile, and pyridine.

Alkene complexes such as cyclooctadiene iridium chloride dimer and chlorobis(cyclooctene)iridium dimer can also be prepared by heating the hydrate with the appropriate alkene in water/alcohol mixtures.

=== Decomposition ===
The trihydrate decomposes to the anhydrous form at 200 °C, which then oxidizes in air at 763 °C to iridium(IV) oxide, which then decomposes to iridium metal at 1070 °C. However, under hydrogen, it is directly reduced at 190 °C to iridium metal:

2 IrCl_{3} + 3 H_{2} → 2 Ir + 6 HCl
