= Iridium =

Iridium, _{77}Ir
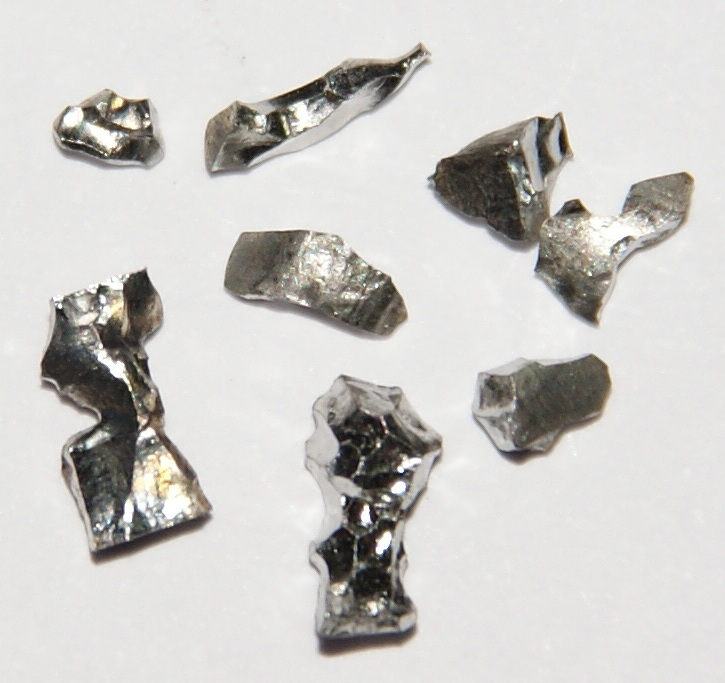

Iridium
- Pronunciation: /ɪˈrɪdiəm/ (ih-RID-ee-əm)
- Appearance: Silvery white

Standard atomic weight A_{r}°(Ir)
- 192.217±0.002; 192.22±0.01 (abridged)

Iridium in the periodic table
Hydrogen																															Helium
Lithium	Beryllium																									Boron	Carbon	Nitrogen	Oxygen	Fluorine	Neon
Sodium	Magnesium																									Aluminium	Silicon	Phosphorus	Sulfur	Chlorine	Argon
Potassium	Calcium															Scandium	Titanium	Vanadium	Chromium	Manganese	Iron	Cobalt	Nickel	Copper	Zinc	Gallium	Germanium	Arsenic	Selenium	Bromine	Krypton
Rubidium	Strontium															Yttrium	Zirconium	Niobium	Molybdenum	Technetium	Ruthenium	Rhodium	Palladium	Silver	Cadmium	Indium	Tin	Antimony	Tellurium	Iodine	Xenon
Caesium	Barium	Lanthanum	Cerium	Praseodymium	Neodymium	Promethium	Samarium	Europium	Gadolinium	Terbium	Dysprosium	Holmium	Erbium	Thulium	Ytterbium	Lutetium	Hafnium	Tantalum	Tungsten	Rhenium	Osmium	Iridium	Platinum	Gold	Mercury (element)	Thallium	Lead	Bismuth	Polonium	Astatine	Radon
Francium	Radium	Actinium	Thorium	Protactinium	Uranium	Neptunium	Plutonium	Americium	Curium	Berkelium	Californium	Einsteinium	Fermium	Mendelevium	Nobelium	Lawrencium	Rutherfordium	Dubnium	Seaborgium	Bohrium	Hassium	Meitnerium	Darmstadtium	Roentgenium	Copernicium	Nihonium	Flerovium	Moscovium	Livermorium	Tennessine	Oganesson
Rh
↑
Ir
↓
Mt
osmium ← iridium → platinum
- Atomic number (Z): 77
- Group: group 9
- Period: period 6
- Block: d-block
- Electron configuration: [Xe] 4f^{14} 5d^{7} 6s^{2}
- Electrons per shell: 2, 8, 18, 32, 15, 2

Physical properties
- Phase at STP: solid
- Melting point: 2719 K (2446 °C, 4435 °F)
- Boiling point: 4403 K (4130 °C, 7466 °F)
- Density (at 20° C): 22.562 g/cm^{3}
- (at STP): 22,571 g/L
- when liquid (at m.p.): 19 g/cm^{3}
- Heat of fusion: 41.12 kJ/mol
- Heat of vaporization: 564 kJ/mol
- Molar heat capacity: 25.10 J/(mol·K)
- Specific heat capacity: 130.58 J/(kg·K)
Vapor pressure
P (Pa)	1	10	100	1 k	10 k	100 k
at T (K)	2713	2957	3252	3614	4069	4659

Atomic properties
- Oxidation states: common: +3, +4 −3, −2, −1, 0, +1, +2, +5, +6, +7, +8, +9
- Electronegativity: Pauling scale: 2.20
- Ionization energies: 1st: 880 kJ/mol; 2nd: 1600 kJ/mol
- Atomic radius: empirical: 136 pm
- Covalent radius: 141±6 pm
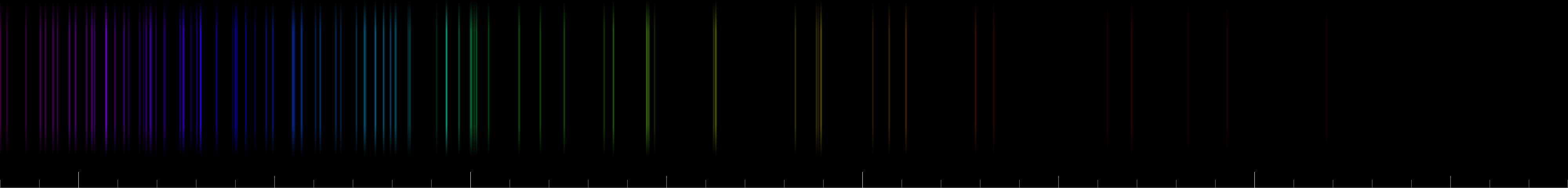
- Spectral lines of iridium

Other properties
- Natural occurrence: primordial
- Crystal structure: face-centered cubic (fcc) (cF4)
- Lattice constant: a = 383.92 pm (at 20 °C)
- Thermal expansion: 6.47×10^{−6} K^{−1} (at 20 °C)
- Thermal conductivity: 147 W/(m⋅K)
- Electrical resistivity: 47.1 nΩ⋅m (at 20 °C)
- Magnetic ordering: paramagnetic
- Molar magnetic susceptibility: +25.6×10^{−6} cm^{3}/mol (298 K)
- Young's modulus: 528 GPa
- Shear modulus: 210 GPa
- Bulk modulus: 320 GPa
- Speed of sound thin rod: 4825 m/s (at 20 °C)
- Poisson ratio: 0.26
- Mohs hardness: 6.5
- Vickers hardness: 1760–2200 MPa
- Brinell hardness: 1670 MPa
- CAS Number: 7439-88-5

History
- Naming: after Ἶρις, the Greek goddess of the rainbow, for the strong colors of its salts
- Discovery and first isolation: Smithson Tennant (1803)

Isotopes of iridium
Main isotopes			Decay	
Isotope	abundance	half-life (t_{1/2})	mode	product
^{189}Ir	synth	13.2 d	ε	^{189}Os
^{190}Ir	synth	11.751 d	ε	^{190}Os
^{191}Ir	37.3%	stable		
^{192}Ir	synth	73.82 d	β^{−}	^{192}Pt
^{192}Ir	synth	73.82 d	ε	^{192}Os
^{192m2}Ir	synth	241 y	IT	^{192}Ir
^{193}Ir	62.7%	stable		

Iridium is a chemical element; it has the symbol Ir and atomic number 77. This very hard, brittle, silvery-white transition metal of the platinum group is considered the second-densest naturally occurring metal (after osmium), with a density of 22.56 g/cm^{3} (0.815 lb/cu in) as defined by experimental X-ray crystallography. (Note: At room temperature and standard atmospheric pressure, iridium has been calculated to have a density of 22.65 g/cm^{3} (0.818 lb/cu in), 0.04 g/cm^{3} (0.0014 lb/cu in) higher than osmium measured the same way. Still, the experimental X-ray crystallography value is considered to be the most accurate, and as such iridium is considered to be the second densest element.) ^{191}Ir and ^{193}Ir are the only two naturally occurring isotopes of iridium, as well as the only stable isotopes; the latter is the more abundant. It is one of the most corrosion-resistant metals, even at temperatures as high as 2,000 °C (3,600 °F).

Iridium was discovered in 1803 in the acid-insoluble residues of platinum ores by the British chemist Smithson Tennant. The name iridium, derived from the Greek word iris (rainbow), refers to the various colors of its compounds. Iridium is one of the rarest elements in Earth's crust, with an estimated annual production of only 6,800 kilograms (15,000 lb) in 2023.

The dominant uses of iridium and its alloys are in high-performance spark plugs, crucibles for recrystallization of semiconductors at high temperatures, and electrodes for the production of chlorine in the chloralkali process. Important compounds of iridium are chlorides and iodides in industrial catalysis. Iridium is a component of some OLEDs.

Iridium is found in meteorites in much higher abundance than in the Earth's crust. For this reason, the unusually high abundance of iridium in the clay layer at the Cretaceous–Paleogene boundary gave rise to the Alvarez hypothesis that the impact of a massive extraterrestrial object caused the extinction of non-avian dinosaurs and many other species 66 million years ago, now known to be produced by the impact that formed the Chicxulub crater. Similarly, an iridium anomaly in core samples from the Pacific Ocean suggested the Eltanin impact of about 2.5 million years ago.

== Characteristics ==
=== Physical properties ===
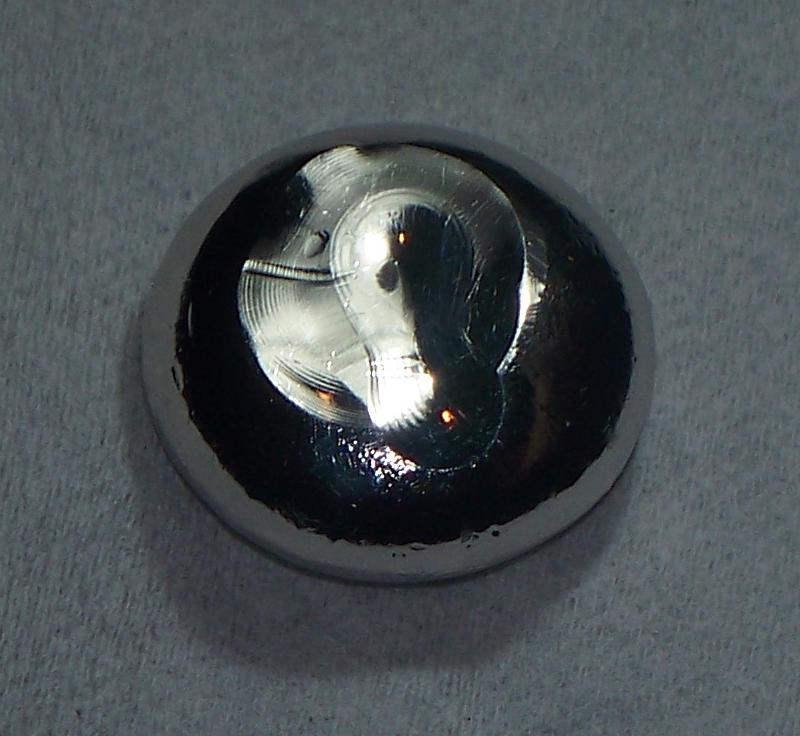
One troy ounce (31.1035 grams) of arc-melted iridium

A member of the platinum group metals, iridium is white, resembling platinum, but with a slight yellowish cast. Because of its hardness, brittleness, and very high melting point, solid iridium is difficult to machine, form, or work; thus powder metallurgy is commonly employed instead. It is the only metal to maintain good mechanical properties in air at temperatures above 1600 °C (2910 °F). It has the 10th highest boiling point among all elements and becomes a superconductor at temperatures below 0.14 K (−273.01 °C; −459.42 °F).

Iridium's modulus of elasticity is the second-highest among the metals, surpassed only by osmium. This, together with a high shear modulus and a very low figure for Poisson's ratio (the relationship of longitudinal to lateral strain), indicate the high degree of stiffness and resistance to deformation that have rendered its fabrication into useful components a matter of great difficulty. Despite these limitations and iridium's high cost, a number of applications have developed where mechanical strength is an essential factor in some of the extremely severe conditions encountered in modern technology.

The measured density of iridium is only slightly lower (by about 0.12 %) than that of osmium, the densest metal known. Some ambiguity occurred regarding which of the two elements was denser, due to the small size of the difference in density and difficulties in measuring it accurately, but, with increased accuracy in factors used for calculating density, X-ray crystallographic data yielded densities of 22.56 g/cm^{3} (0.815 lb/cu in) for iridium and 22.59 g/cm^{3} (0.816 lb/cu in) for osmium.

Iridium is extremely brittle, to the point of being hard to weld because the heat-affected zone cracks, but it can be made more ductile by addition of small quantities of titanium and zirconium (0.2 % of each apparently works well).

The Vickers hardness of pure platinum is 56 HV, whereas an alloy of 50 % platinum and iridium can reach over 500 HV.

=== Chemical properties ===
Iridium is the most corrosion-resistant metal known. It is not attacked by acids, including aqua regia, but it can be dissolved in concentrated hydrochloric acid in the presence of sodium perchlorate. In the presence of oxygen, it reacts with cyanide salts. Traditional oxidants also react, including the halogens and oxygen at higher temperatures. Iridium also reacts directly with sulfur at atmospheric pressure to yield iridium disulfide.

=== Isotopes ===
Iridium has two naturally occurring stable isotopes, ^{191}Ir and ^{193}Ir, with natural abundances of 37.3 % and 62.7 %, respectively. There are also 40 known radioisotopes, ranging in mass number from 164 to 205. ^{192}Ir, which falls between the two stable isotopes, is the most stable radioisotope, has a half-life of 73.82 days, and finds application in brachytherapy and in industrial radiography, particularly for nondestructive testing of welds in steel in the oil and gas industries; iridium-192 sources have been involved in a number of radiological accidents. Three other isotopes have half-lives of at least a day—^{188}Ir, ^{189}Ir, and ^{190}Ir. Isotopes with masses below 191 decay by some combination of β^{+} decay, α decay, and (rare) proton emission. Synthetic isotopes heavier than 193 decay by β^{−} decay, and ^{192}Ir has both, but β^{+} decay (95.24 %) dominates over electron capture (4.76 %).

At least 32 metastable isomers have been characterized, ranging in mass number from 164 to 197. The most stable of these is ^{192m2}Ir, which decays by isomeric transition with a half-life of 241 years, making it more stable than any of iridium's ground-state radioisotopes.

The isotope ^{191}Ir was the first one of any element to be shown to present a Mössbauer effect. This renders it useful for Mössbauer spectroscopy for research in physics, chemistry, biochemistry, metallurgy, and mineralogy.

== Chemistry ==
Oxidation states (Note: Most common oxidation states of iridium are in bold. The right column lists one representative compound for each oxidation state.)
−3	[Ir(CO)_{3}]^{3−}
−2	IrVO_{2}^{−}
−1	[Ir(CO)_{3}(PPh_{3})]^{−}
0	Ir_{4}(CO)_{12}
+1	[IrCl(CO)(PPh_{3})_{2}]
+2	Ir(C_{5}H_{5})_{2}
+3	IrCl_{3}
+4	IrO_{2}
+5	Ir_{4}F_{20}
+6	IrF_{6}
+7	[Ir(O_{2})O_{2}]^{+}
+8	IrO_{4}
+9	[IrO_{4}]^{+}

=== Oxidation states ===
Iridium forms compounds in oxidation states between −3 and +9, but the most common oxidation states are +1, +2, +3, and +4. Well-characterized compounds containing iridium in the +6 oxidation state include IrF_{6} and the oxides Sr_{2}MgIrO_{6} and Sr_{2}CaIrO_{6}. Iridium(VIII) oxide (IrO_{4}) was generated under matrix isolation conditions at 6 K in argon. The highest oxidation state (+9), which is also the highest recorded for any element, is found in gaseous [IrO_{4}]^{+}.

=== Binary compounds ===
Iridium forms trihydride at very high pressures. Only one binary oxide is well-characterized: iridium dioxide, IrO_{2}. It is a blue-black solid that adopts the fluorite structure. A sesquioxide, Ir_{2}O_{3}, has been described as a blue-black powder, which is oxidized to IrO_{2} by HNO_{3}. Other iridium chalcogenides include the sulfides IrS_{2}, Ir_{2}S_{3} and IrS_{3}, and the selenides IrSe_{2} and Ir_{2}Se_{3}.

Binary trihalides, IrX_{3}, are known for all of the halogens. For oxidation states +4 and above, only the tetrafluoride, pentafluoride and hexafluoride are known. Iridium hexafluoride, IrF_{6}, is a volatile yellow solid, composed of octahedral molecules. It decomposes in water and is reduced to IrF_{4}. Iridium pentafluoride is also a strong oxidant, but it is a tetramer, Ir_{4}F_{20}, formed by four corner-sharing octahedra.

=== Complexes ===
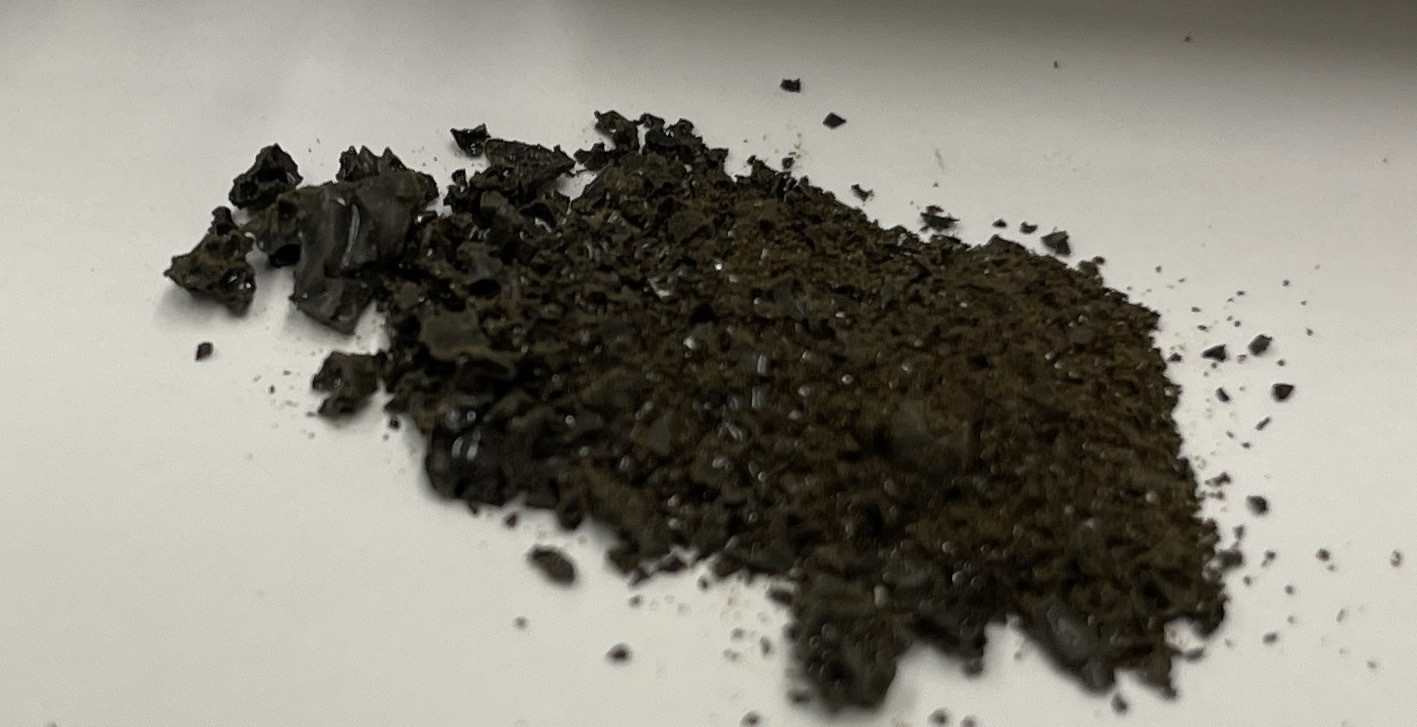
Hydrated iridium trichloride, a common salt of iridium.

Iridium has extensive coordination chemistry.

Iridium in its complexes is always low-spin. Ir(III) and Ir(IV) generally form octahedral complexes. Polyhydride complexes are known for the +5 and +3 oxidation states. One example is IrH_{5}(P^{i}Pr_{3})_{2} (^{i}Pr = isopropyl). The ternary hydride Mg_{6}Ir_{2}H_{11} is believed to contain both the IrH_{5}^{4−} and the 18-electron IrH_{4}^{5−} anion.

Iridium also forms oxyanions with oxidation states +4 and +5. K_{2}IrO_{3} and KIrO_{3} can be prepared from the reaction of potassium oxide or potassium superoxide with iridium at high temperatures. Such solids are not soluble in conventional solvents.

Just like many elements, iridium forms important chloride complexes. Hexachloroiridic (IV) acid, H_{2}IrCl_{6}, and its ammonium salt are common iridium compounds from both industrial and preparative perspectives. They are intermediates in the purification of iridium and used as precursors for most other iridium compounds, as well as in the preparation of anode coatings. The IrCl_{6}^{2−} ion has an intense dark brown color, and can be readily reduced to the lighter-colored IrCl_{6}^{3−} and vice versa. Iridium trichloride, IrCl_{3}, which can be obtained in anhydrous form from direct oxidation of iridium powder by chlorine at 650 °C, or in hydrated form by dissolving Ir_{2}O_{3} in hydrochloric acid, is often used as a starting material for the synthesis of other Ir(III) compounds. Another compound used as a starting material is potassium hexachloroiridate(III), K_{3}IrCl_{6}.

=== Organoiridium chemistry ===
Cyclooctadiene iridium chloride dimer is a common complex of Ir(I).

Organoiridium compounds contain iridium–carbon bonds. Early studies identified the very stable tetrairidium dodecacarbonyl, Ir_{4}(CO)_{12}. In this compound, each of the iridium atoms is bonded to the other three, forming a tetrahedral cluster. The discovery of Vaska's complex (IrCl(CO)[P(C_{6}H_{5})_{3}]_{2}) opened the door for oxidative addition reactions, a process fundamental to useful reactions. For example, Crabtree's catalyst, a homogeneous catalyst for hydrogenation reactions.

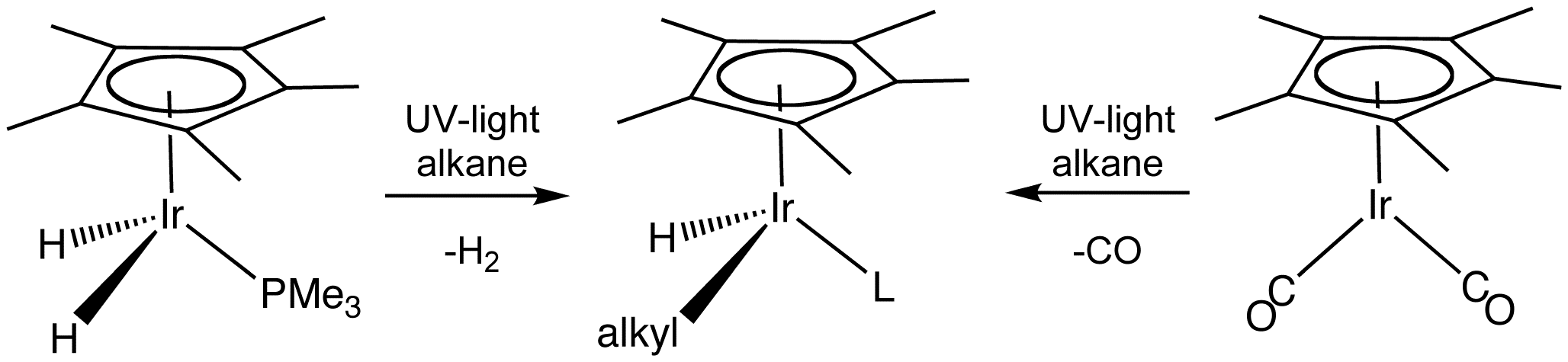
Oxidative addition to hydrocarbons in organoiridium chemistry

Iridium complexes played a pivotal role in the development of carbon–hydrogen bond activation (C–H activation), which promises to allow functionalization of hydrocarbons, which are traditionally regarded as unreactive.

== History ==
=== Platinum group ===
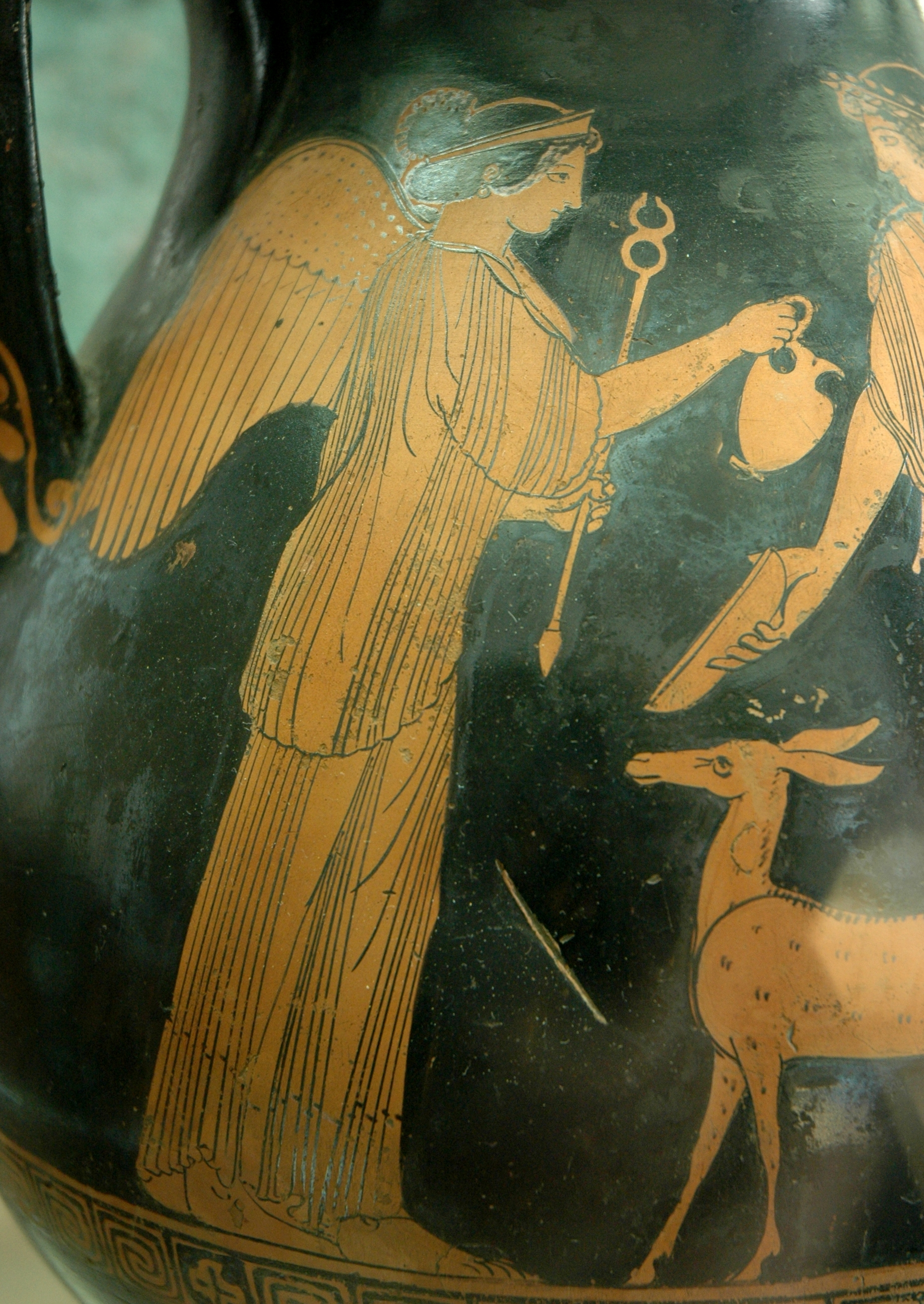
The Greek goddess Iris, after whom iridium was named.

The discovery of iridium is intertwined with that of platinum and the other metals of the platinum group. The first European reference to platinum appears in 1557 in the writings of the Italian humanist Julius Caesar Scaliger as a description of an unknown noble metal found between Darién and Mexico, "which no fire nor any Spanish artifice has yet been able to liquefy". From their first encounters with platinum, the Spanish generally saw the metal as a kind of impurity in gold, and it was treated as such. It was often simply thrown away, and there was an official decree forbidding the adulteration of gold with platinum impurities.

This alchemical symbol for platinum was made by joining the symbols of silver (moon) and gold (sun).

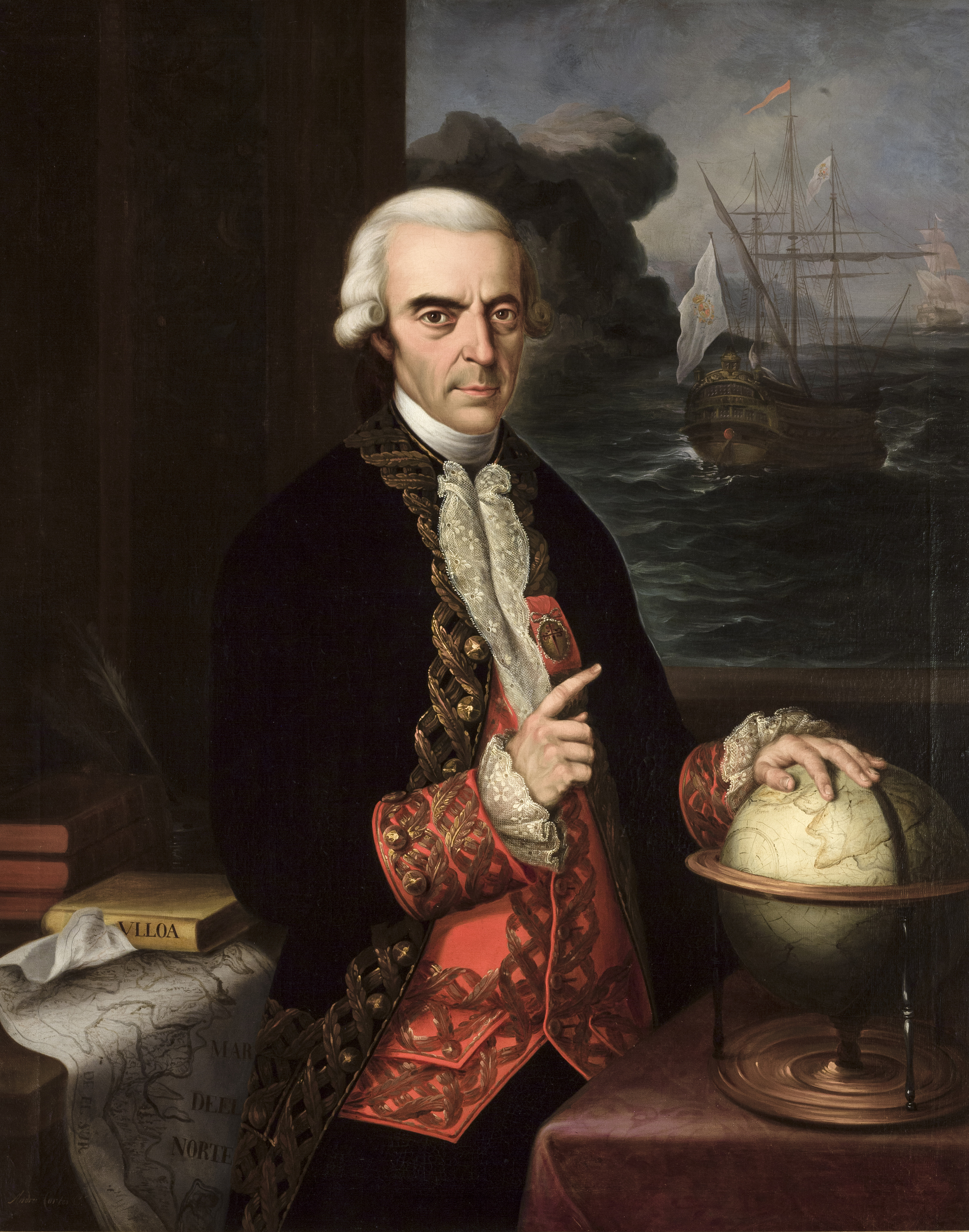
Antonio de Ulloa is credited in European history with the discovery of platinum.

In 1735, Antonio de Ulloa and Jorge Juan y Santacilia saw Native Americans mining platinum while the Spaniards were travelling through Colombia and Peru for eight years. Ulloa and Juan found mines with the whitish metal nuggets and took them home to Spain. Ulloa returned to Spain and established the first mineralogy lab in Spain and was the first to systematically study platinum, which was in 1748. His historical account of the expedition included a description of platinum as being neither separable nor calcinable. Ulloa also anticipated the discovery of platinum mines. After publishing the report in 1748, Ulloa did not continue to investigate the new metal. In 1758, he was sent to superintend mercury mining operations in Huancavelica.

In 1741, Charles Wood, a British metallurgist, found various samples of Colombian platinum in Jamaica, which he sent to William Brownrigg for further investigation.

In 1750, after studying the platinum sent to him by Wood, Brownrigg presented a detailed account of the metal to the Royal Society, stating that he had seen no mention of it in any previous accounts of known minerals. Brownrigg also made note of platinum's extremely high melting point and refractory metal-like behaviour toward borax. Other chemists across Europe soon began studying platinum, including Andreas Sigismund Marggraf, Torbern Bergman, Jöns Jakob Berzelius, William Lewis, and Pierre Macquer. In 1752, Henrik Scheffer published a detailed scientific description of the metal, which he referred to as "white gold", including an account of how he succeeded in fusing platinum ore with the aid of arsenic. Scheffer described platinum as being less pliable than gold, but with similar resistance to corrosion.

=== Discovery ===
Chemists who studied platinum dissolved it in aqua regia (a mixture of hydrochloric and nitric acids) to create soluble salts. They always observed a small amount of a dark, insoluble residue. Joseph Louis Proust thought that the residue was graphite. The French chemists Victor Collet-Descotils, Antoine François, comte de Fourcroy, and Louis Nicolas Vauquelin also observed the black residue in 1803, but did not obtain enough for further experiments.

In 1803 British scientist Smithson Tennant (1761–1815) analyzed the insoluble residue and concluded that it must contain a new metal. Vauquelin treated the powder alternately with alkali and acids and obtained a volatile new oxide, which he believed to be of this new metal—which he named ptene, from the Greek word πτηνός ptēnós, "winged". Tennant, who had the advantage of a much greater amount of residue, continued his research and identified the two previously undiscovered elements in the black residue, iridium and osmium. He obtained dark red crystals (probably of Na_{2}[IrCl_{6}]·nH_{2}O) by a sequence of reactions with sodium hydroxide and hydrochloric acid. He named iridium after Iris (Ἶρις), the Greek winged goddess of the rainbow and the messenger of the Olympian gods, because many of the salts he obtained were strongly colored. (Note: Iridium literally means "of rainbows".) Discovery of the new elements was documented in a letter to the Royal Society on June 21, 1804.

=== Metalworking and applications ===
British scientist John George Children was the first to melt a sample of iridium in 1813 with the aid of "the greatest galvanic battery that has ever been constructed" (at that time). The first to obtain high-purity iridium was Robert Hare in 1842. He found it had a density of around 21.8 g/cm^{3} (0.79 lb/cu in) and noted the metal is nearly immalleable and very hard. The first melting in appreciable quantity was done by Henri Sainte-Claire Deville and Jules Henri Debray in 1860. They required burning more than 300 litres (79 US gal) of pure O_{2} and H_{2} gas for each 1 kilogram (2.2 lb) of iridium.

These extreme difficulties in melting the metal limited the possibilities for handling iridium. John Isaac Hawkins was looking to obtain a fine and hard point for fountain pen nibs, and in 1834 managed to create an iridium-pointed gold pen. In 1880, John Holland and William Lofland Dudley were able to melt iridium by adding phosphorus and patented the process in the United States; British company Johnson Matthey later stated they had been using a similar process since 1837 and had already presented fused iridium at a number of World Fairs. The first use of an alloy of iridium with ruthenium in thermocouples was made by Otto Feussner in 1933. These allowed for the measurement of high temperatures in air up to 2,000 °C (3,630 °F).

In Munich, Germany in 1957 Rudolf Mössbauer, in what has been called one of the "landmark experiments in twentieth-century physics", discovered the resonant and recoil-free emission and absorption of gamma rays by atoms in a solid metal sample containing only ^{191}Ir. This phenomenon, known as the Mössbauer effect resulted in the awarding of the Nobel Prize in Physics in 1961, at the age 32, just three years after he published his discovery.

== Occurrence ==
Platinum group metals iridium production

Along with many elements having atomic weights higher than that of iron, iridium is only naturally formed by the r-process (rapid neutron capture) in neutron star mergers and possibly rare types of supernovae.

Iridium is one of the least abundant elements in Earth's crust.

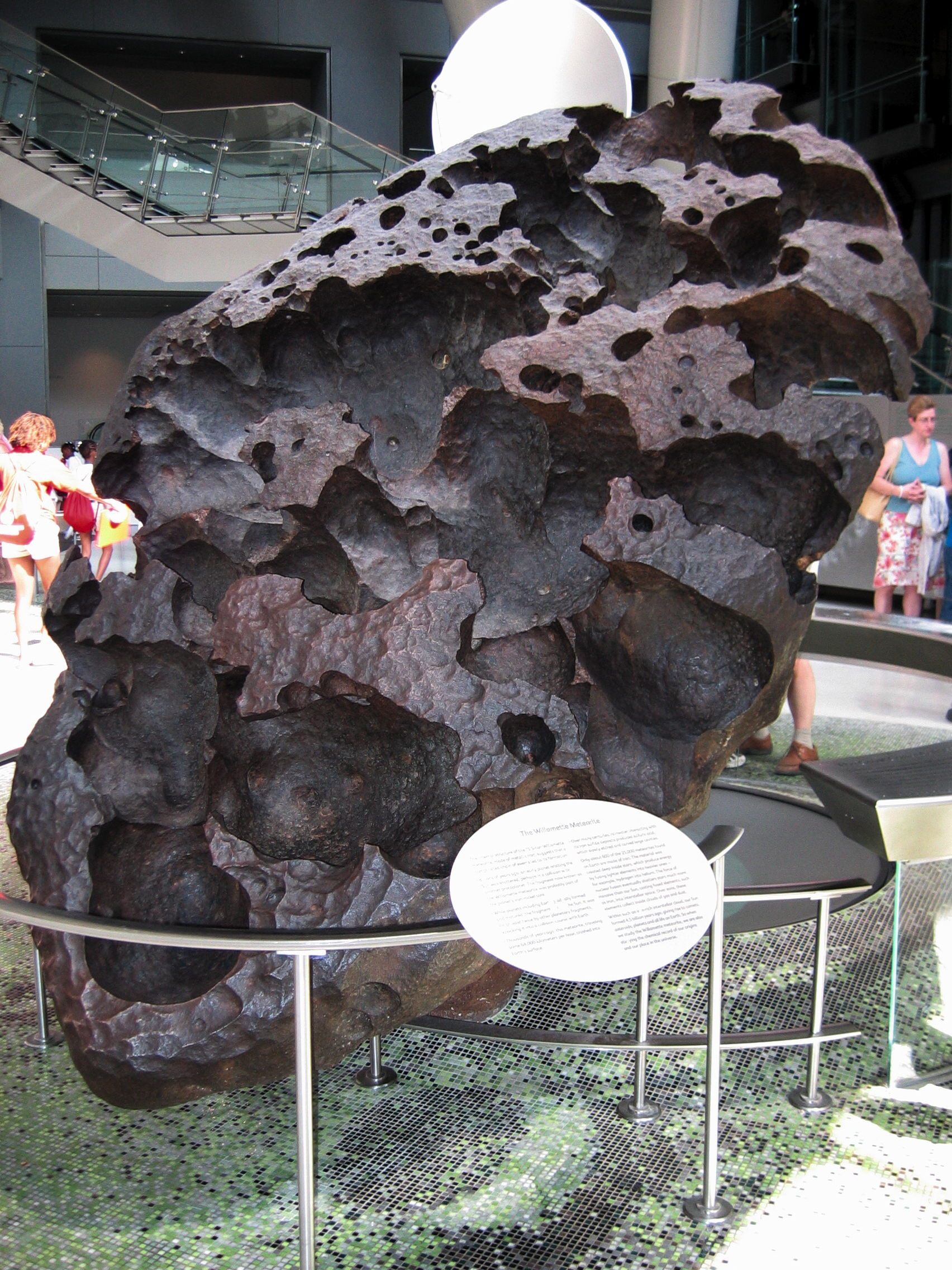
The Willamette Meteorite has 4.7 ppm iridium.

Iridium is one of the nine least abundant stable elements in Earth's crust, having an average mass fraction of 0.001 ppm in crustal rock; gold is 4 times more abundant, platinum is 10 times more abundant, silver and mercury are 80 times more abundant. Osmium, tellurium, ruthenium, rhodium and rhenium are about as abundant as iridium. In contrast to its low abundance in crustal rock, iridium is relatively common in meteorites, with concentrations of 0.5 ppm or more. The overall concentration of iridium on Earth is thought to be much higher than what is observed in crustal rocks, but because of the density and siderophilic ("iron-loving") character of iridium, it descended below the crust and into Earth's core when the planet was still molten.

Iridium is found in nature as an uncombined element or in natural alloys, especially the iridium–osmium alloys osmiridium (osmium-rich) and iridosmium (iridium-rich). In nickel and copper deposits, the platinum group metals occur as sulfides, tellurides, antimonides, and arsenides. In all of these compounds, platinum can be exchanged with a small amount of iridium or osmium. As with all of the platinum group metals, iridium can be found naturally in alloys with raw nickel or raw copper. A number of iridium-dominant minerals, with iridium as the species-forming element, are known. They are exceedingly rare and often represent the iridium analogues of the above-given ones. The examples are irarsite and cuproiridsite, to mention some. Within Earth's crust, iridium is found at highest concentrations in three types of geologic structure: igneous deposits (crustal intrusions from below), impact craters, and deposits reworked from one of the former structures. The largest known primary reserves are in the Bushveld igneous complex in South Africa, (near the largest known impact structure, the Vredefort impact structure) though the large copper–nickel deposits near Norilsk in Russia, and the Sudbury Basin (also an impact crater) in Canada are also significant sources of iridium. Smaller reserves are found in the United States. Iridium is also found in secondary deposits, combined with platinum and other platinum group metals in alluvial deposits. The alluvial deposits used by pre-Columbian people in the Chocó Department of Colombia are still a source for platinum-group metals. As of 2003, world reserves have not been estimated.

=== Marine oceanography ===
Iridium is found within marine organisms, sediments, and the water column. The abundance of iridium in seawater and organisms is relatively low, as it does not readily form chloride complexes. The abundance in organisms is about 20 parts per trillion, or about five orders of magnitude less than in sedimentary rocks at the Cretaceous–Paleogene (K–T) boundary. The concentration of iridium in seawater and marine sediment is sensitive to marine oxygenation, seawater temperature, and various geological and biological processes.

Iridium in sediments can come from cosmic dust, volcanoes, precipitation from seawater, microbial processes, or hydrothermal vents, and its abundance can be strongly indicative of the source. It tends to associate with other ferrous metals in manganese nodules. Iridium is one of the characteristic elements of extraterrestrial rocks, and, along with osmium, can be used as a tracer element for meteoritic material in sediment. For example, core samples from the Pacific Ocean with elevated iridium levels suggested the Eltanin impact of about 2.5 million years ago.

Some of the mass extinctions, such as the Cretaceous extinction, can be identified by anomalously high concentrations of iridium in sediment, and these can be linked to major asteroid impacts.

=== Cretaceous–Paleogene boundary presence ===
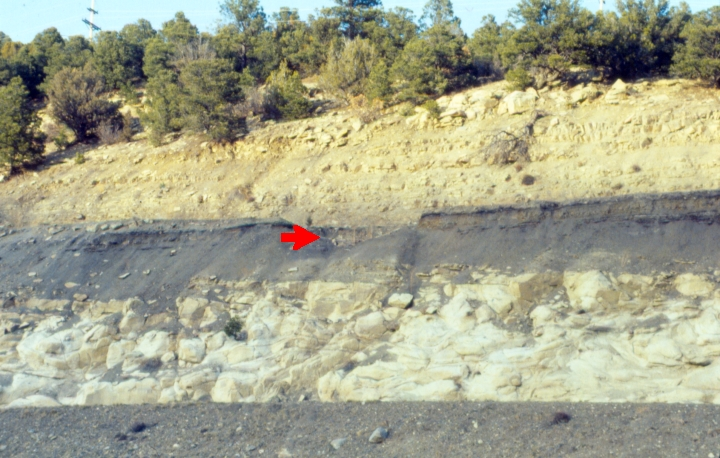
The red arrow points to the Cretaceous–Paleogene boundary.

The Cretaceous–Paleogene boundary of 66 million years ago, marking the temporal border between the Cretaceous and Paleogene periods of geological time, was identified by a thin stratum of iridium-rich clay. A team led by Luis Alvarez proposed in 1980 an extraterrestrial origin for this iridium, attributing it to an asteroid or comet impact. Their theory, known as the Alvarez hypothesis, is now widely accepted to explain the extinction of the non-avian dinosaurs. A large buried impact crater structure with an estimated age of about 66 million years was later identified under what is now the Yucatán Peninsula (the Chicxulub crater). Dewey M. McLean and others argue that the iridium may have been of volcanic origin instead, because Earth's core is rich in iridium, and active volcanoes such as Piton de la Fournaise, in the island of Réunion, are still releasing iridium.

== Production ==
Year	Consumption (tonnes)	Price (US$)
2001	2.6	$415.25/ozt ($13.351/g)
2002	2.5	$294.62/ozt ($9.472/g)
2003	3.3	$93.02/ozt ($2.991/g)
2004	3.60	$185.33/ozt ($5.958/g)
2005	3.86	$169.51/ozt ($5.450/g)
2006	4.08	$349.45/ozt ($11.235/g)
2007	3.70	$444.43/ozt ($14.289/g)
2008	3.10	$448.34/ozt ($14.414/g)
2009	2.52	$420.4/ozt ($13.52/g)
2010	10.40	$642.15/ozt ($20.646/g)
2011	9.36	$1,035.87/ozt ($33.304/g)
2012	5.54	$1,066.23/ozt ($34.280/g)
2013	6.16	$826.45/ozt ($26.571/g)
2014	6.1	$556.19/ozt ($17.882/g)
2015	7.81	$544/ozt ($17.5/g)
2016	7.71	$586.90/ozt ($18.869/g)
2017	n.d.	$908.35/ozt ($29.204/g)
2018	n.d.	$1,293.27/ozt ($41.580/g)
2019	n.d.	$1,485.80/ozt ($47.770/g)
2020	n.d.	$1,633.51/ozt ($52.519/g)
2021	n.d.	$5,400.00/ozt ($173.614/g)
2022	n.d.	$3,980.00/ozt ($127.960/g)
2023	n.d.	$4,652.38/ozt ($149.577/g)
2024	n.d.	$5,000.00/ozt ($160.754/g)

Worldwide production of iridium was about 7,300 kilograms (16,100 lb) in 2018. The price is high and varying (see table). Iridium reached a high of US$8000 (per troy ounce) in March 2026 (which is also the record high for iridium when adjusted for inflation). Illustrative factors that affect the price include oversupply of Ir crucibles and changes in LED technology.

Platinum metals occur together as dilute ores. Iridium is one of the rarer platinum metals: for every 190 tonnes of platinum obtained from ores, only 7.5 tonnes of iridium is isolated. To separate the metals, they must first be brought into solution. Two methods for rendering Ir-containing ores soluble are (i) fusion of the solid with sodium peroxide followed by extraction of the resulting glass in aqua regia and (ii) extraction of the solid with a mixture of chlorine with hydrochloric acid. From soluble extracts, iridium is separated by precipitating solid ammonium hexachloroiridate ((NH_{4})_{2}IrCl_{6}) or by extracting IrCl_{6}^{2−} with organic amines. The first method is similar to the procedure Tennant and Wollaston used for their original separation. The second method can be planned as continuous liquid–liquid extraction and is therefore more suitable for industrial scale production. In either case, the product, an iridium chloride salt, is reduced with hydrogen, yielding the metal as a powder or sponge, which is amenable to powder metallurgy techniques. Iridium is also obtained commercially as a by-product from nickel and copper mining and processing. During electrorefining of copper and nickel, noble metals such as silver, gold and the platinum group metals as well as selenium and tellurium settle to the bottom of the cell as anode mud, which forms the starting point for their extraction.

Leading iridium-producing countries (kg)
Country	2016	2017	2018	2019	2020
World	7,720	7,180	7,540	7,910	8,170
South Africa *	6,624	6,057	6,357	6,464	6,786
Zimbabwe	598	619	586	845	836
Canada *	300	200	400	300	300
Russia *	200	300	200	300	250

== Applications ==
Due to iridium's resistance to corrosion, it has industrial applications. The main areas of use are electrodes for producing chlorine and other corrosive products, OLEDs, crucibles, catalysts (e.g. acetic acid), and ignition tips for spark plugs.

=== Metal and alloys ===
Resistance to heat and corrosion are the bases for several uses of iridium and its alloys.

Owing to its high melting point, hardness, and corrosion resistance, iridium is used to make crucibles. Such crucibles are used in the Czochralski process to produce oxide single-crystals (such as sapphires) for use in computer bubble memory devices and in solid state lasers. The crystals, such as gadolinium gallium garnet and yttrium gallium garnet, are grown by melting pre-sintered charges of mixed oxides under oxidizing conditions at temperatures up to 2,100 °C (3,810 °F).

Certain long-life aircraft engine parts are made of an iridium alloy, and an iridium–titanium alloy is used for deep-water pipes because of its corrosion resistance. Iridium is used for multi-pored spinnerets, through which a plastic polymer melt is extruded to form fibers, such as rayon. Osmium–iridium is used for compass bearings and for balances.

Because of their resistance to arc erosion, iridium alloys are used by some manufacturers for the centre electrodes of spark plugs, and iridium-based spark plugs are particularly used in aviation.

=== Catalysis ===
Iridium compounds are used as catalysts in the Cativa process for carbonylation of methanol to produce acetic acid.

Iridium complexes are often active for asymmetric hydrogenation both by traditional hydrogenation. and transfer hydrogenation. This property is the basis of the industrial route to the chiral herbicide (S)-metolachlor. As practiced by Syngenta on the scale of 10,000 tons/year, the complex [Ir(COD)Cl]_{2} in the presence of Josiphos ligands.

=== Medical imaging ===
The radioisotope iridium-192 is one of the two most important sources of energy for use in industrial γ-radiography for non-destructive testing of metals. Additionally, ^{192}Ir is used as a source of gamma radiation for the treatment of cancer using brachytherapy, a form of radiotherapy where a sealed radioactive source is placed inside or next to the area requiring treatment. Specific treatments include high-dose-rate prostate brachytherapy, biliary duct brachytherapy, and intracavitary cervix brachytherapy. Iridium-192 is normally produced by neutron activation of isotope iridium-191 in natural-abundance iridium metal.

=== Photocatalysis and OLEDs ===
Iridium complexes are key components of white OLEDs. Similar complexes are used in photocatalysis.

=== Scientific ===
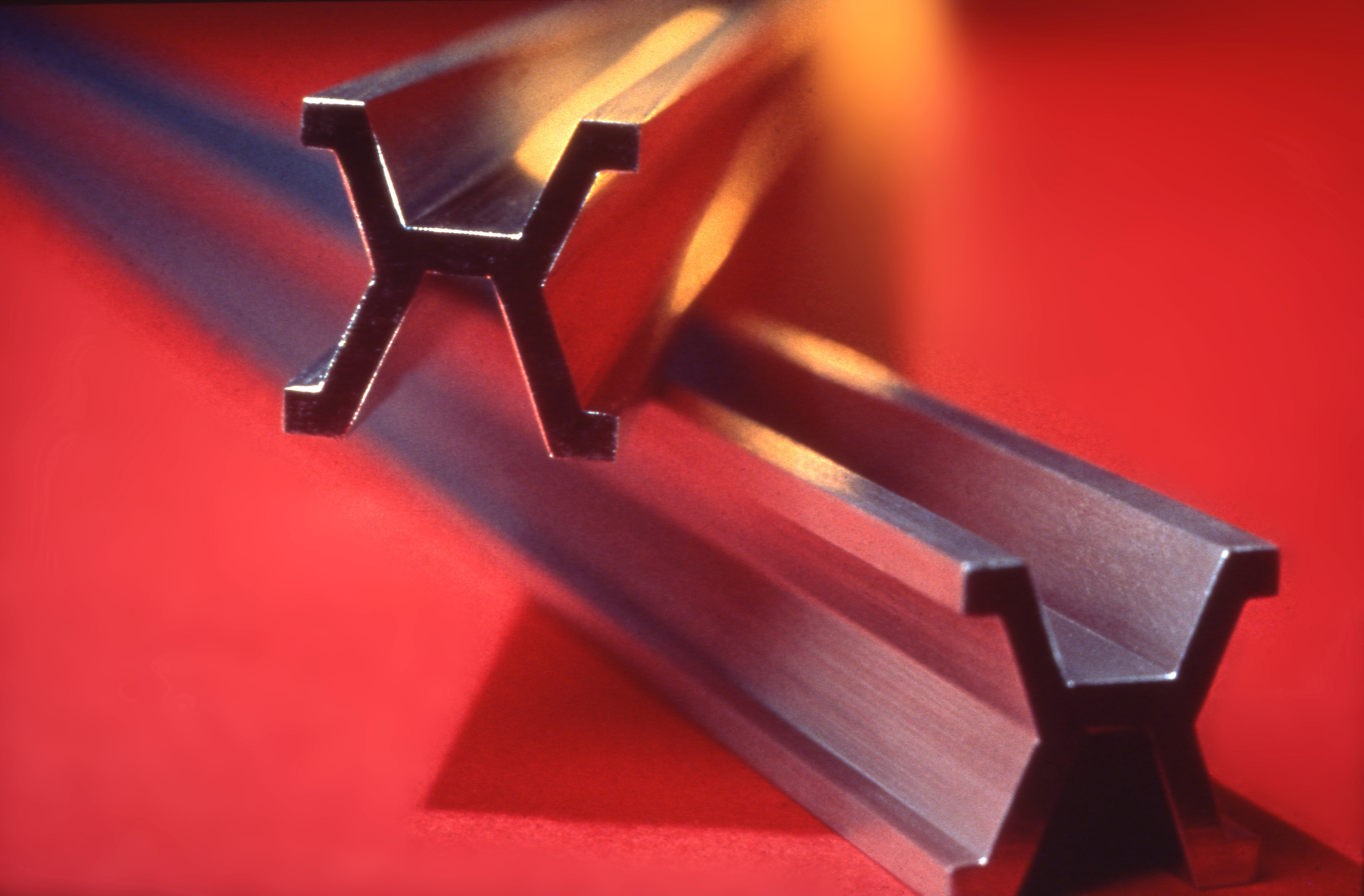
International Prototype Meter bar

An alloy of 90 % platinum and 10 % iridium was used in 1889 to construct the International Prototype Meter and kilogram mass, kept by the International Bureau of Weights and Measures near Paris. The meter bar was replaced as the definition of the fundamental unit of length in 1960 by a line in the atomic spectrum of krypton, (Note: The definition of the meter was changed again in 1983. The meter is currently defined as the distance traveled by light in a vacuum during a time interval of 1/299,792,458 of a second.) but the kilogram prototype remained the international standard of mass until 20 May 2019, when the kilogram was redefined in terms of the Planck constant.

=== Historical ===
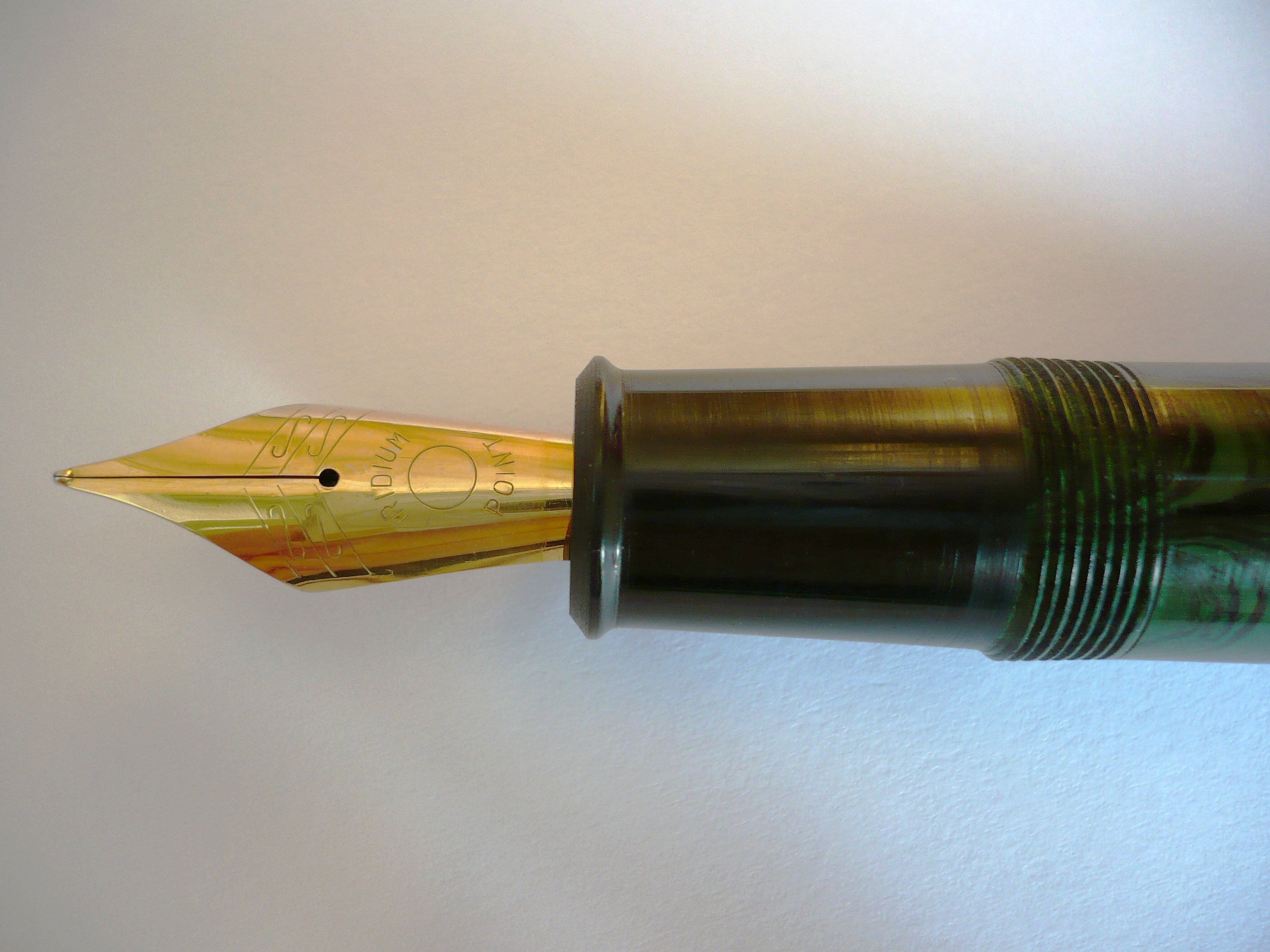
Fountain pen nib labelled Iridium Point

Iridium–osmium alloys were previously used in fountain pen nib tips. The first major use of iridium was in 1834 in nibs mounted on gold. Starting in 1944, the Parker 51 fountain pen was fitted with a nib tipped by a ruthenium and iridium alloy (with 3.8 % iridium). The tip material in modern fountain pens is still conventionally called "iridium", although there is seldom any iridium in it; other metals such as ruthenium, osmium, and tungsten have taken its place.

An iridium–platinum alloy was used for the touch holes or vent pieces of cannon. According to a report of the Paris Exhibition of 1867, one of the pieces being exhibited by Johnson and Matthey "has been used in a Whitworth gun for more than 3000 rounds, and scarcely shows signs of wear yet. Those who know the constant trouble and expense which are occasioned by the wearing of the vent-pieces of cannon when in active service, will appreciate this important adaptation".

The pigment iridium black, which consists of very finely divided iridium, is used for painting porcelain an intense black; it was said that "all other porcelain black colors appear grey by the side of it".

== Precautions and hazards ==
Iridium in bulk metallic form is not biologically important or hazardous to health due to its lack of reactivity with tissues; there are only about 20 parts per trillion of iridium in human tissue. Like most metals, finely divided iridium powder can be hazardous to handle, as it is an irritant and may ignite in air. Iridium is relatively non-hazardous otherwise, with the only effect of Iridium ingestion being irritation of the digestive tract. However, soluble salts, such as the iridium halides, could be hazardous due to elements other than iridium or due to iridium itself. At the same time, most iridium compounds are insoluble, which makes absorption into the body difficult.

A radioisotope of iridium, ^{192}Ir, is dangerous, like other radioactive isotopes. The only reported injuries related to iridium concern accidental exposure to radiation from ^{192}Ir used in brachytherapy. High-energy gamma radiation from ^{192}Ir can increase the risk of cancer. External exposure can cause burns, radiation poisoning, and death. Ingestion of ^{192}Ir can burn the linings of the stomach and the intestines. ^{192}Ir, ^{192m}Ir, and ^{194m}Ir tend to deposit in the liver, and can pose health hazards from both gamma and beta radiation.
