= Sodium hexachloroiridate(III) =

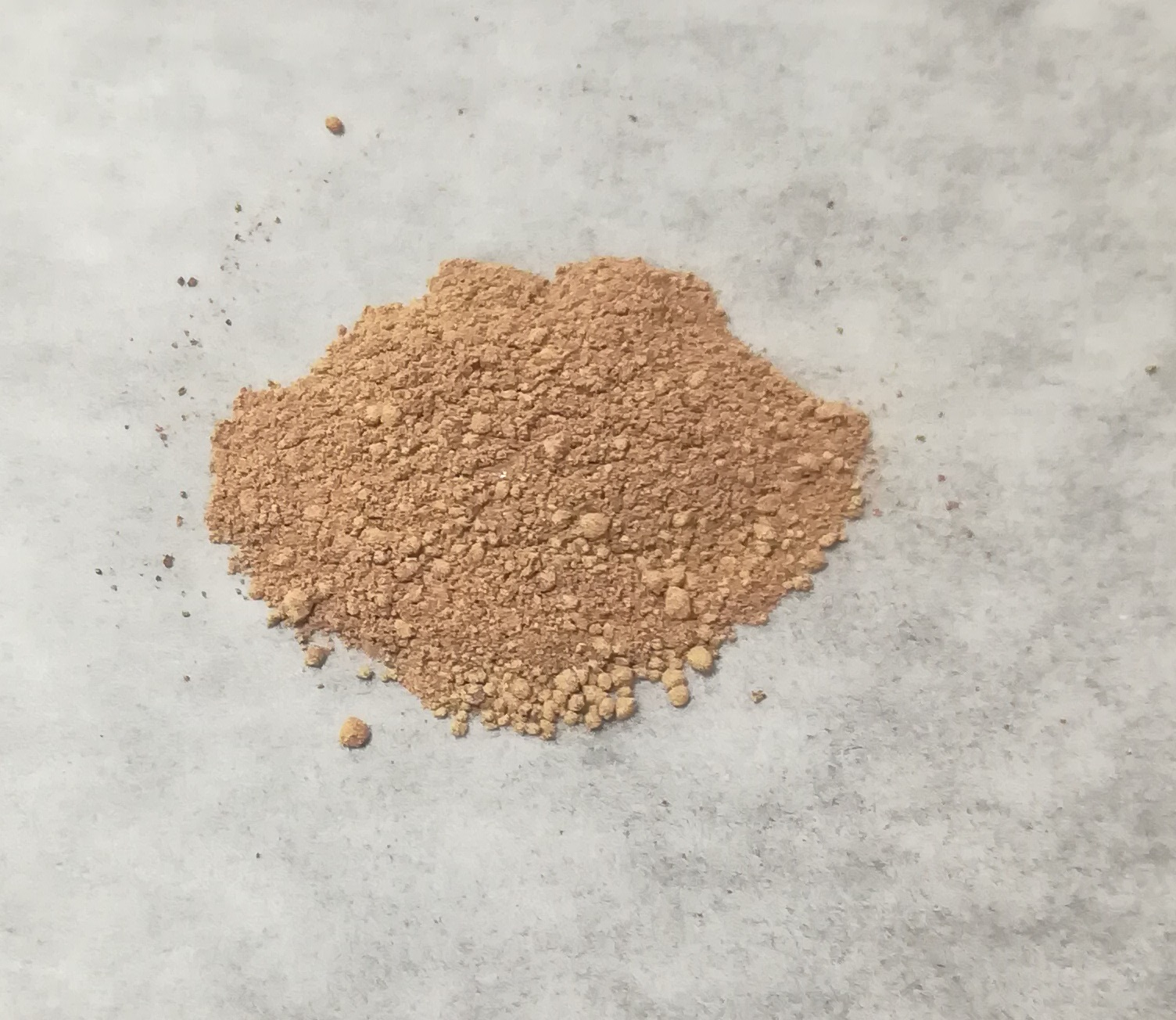

Identifiers
CAS Number	15702-05-3 anhydrate; 123334-23-6 hydrate
3D model (JSmol)	Interactive image
ChemSpider	10752214
ECHA InfoCard	100.036.162
EC Number	239-795-6
PubChem CID	22016331
CompTox Dashboard (EPA)	DTXSID001036058
- InChI: InChI=1S/6ClH.Ir.3Na/h6*1H;;;;/q;;;;;;+3;3*+1/p-6 Key: GSONQQIOULBMRS-UHFFFAOYSA-H
- SMILES: [Na+].[Na+].[Na+].Cl[Ir-3](Cl)(Cl)(Cl)(Cl)Cl

Properties
Chemical formula	Cl_{6}IrNa_{3}
Molar mass	473.89 g·mol^{−1}
Solubility in water	31.46 g/100 g (15°C)
Solubility	insoluble in ethanol, very slightly soluble in acetone
- Except where otherwise noted, data are given for materials in their standard state (at 25 °C [77 °F], 100 kPa). Infobox references

Sodium hexachloroiridate(III) is an inorganic compound with the chemical formula Na_{3}IrCl_{6}.

== Preparation ==
Sodium hexachloroiridate(III) can be produced by the reduction of sodium hexachloroiridate(IV) with Fe^{2+}, oxalate or hydrogen sulfide.

It can also be produced by heating iridium metal with NaCl and Cl_{2}.

== Reactions ==
Sodium hexachloroiridate(III) will get dehydrated at 110°C, and reversible decomposes at 550°C.

2 Na_{3}IrCl_{6} ⇌ 2 Ir + 6 NaCl + 3 Cl_{2}

In air, sodium hexachloroiridate(III) will be oxidized at 450°C.

2 Na_{3}IrCl_{6} + 2 O_{2} → 2 IrO_{2} + 6 NaCl + 3 Cl_{2}

It reacts with hydrochloric acid to form hydrogen hexachloroiridate(III).

It also reacts with ammonia water in sealed tube at 145°C to form [Ir(NH_{3})_{6}]Cl_{3}.
