= Iridium tetroxide =

Iridium(VIII) oxide
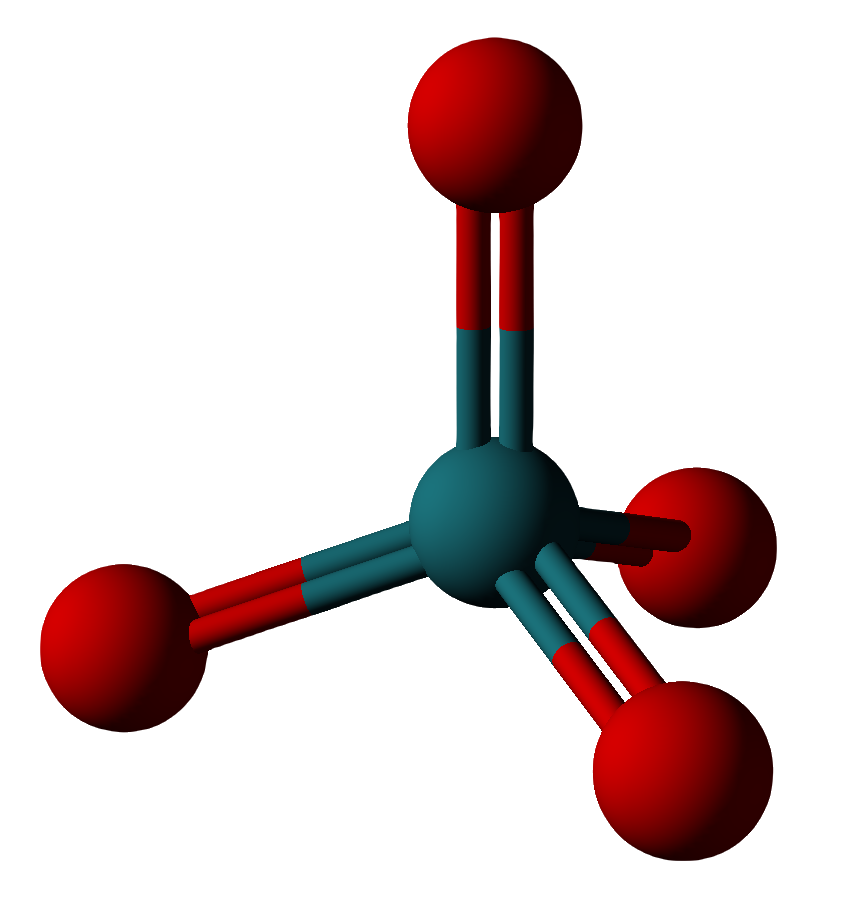

Names
- IUPAC name Iridium(VIII) oxide

Identifiers
CAS Number	474103-25-8
3D model (JSmol)	Interactive image
- InChI: InChI=1S/Ir.4O Key: WIFDYPVIKSJTTM-UHFFFAOYSA-N
- SMILES: O=[Ir](=O)(=O)=O

Properties
Chemical formula	IrO_{4}
Molar mass	256.213 g·mol^{−1}
Melting point	Decomposes at −267.15 °C (−448.87 °F; 6.00 K)
- Except where otherwise noted, data are given for materials in their standard state (at 25 °C [77 °F], 100 kPa). Infobox references

Iridium tetroxide (IrO_{4}, Iridium(VIII) oxide) is a binary compound of oxygen and iridium in oxidation state +8. This compound was formed by photochemical rearrangement of [(η^{1}-O_{2})IrO_{2}] in solid argon at a temperature of 6 K (−267.15 °C; −448.87 °F). At higher temperatures, the oxide is unstable. The detection of the iridium tetroxide cation IrO^{+}_{4} by infrared photodissociation spectroscopy with formal oxidation state +9 has been reported, the highest currently known of any element. However no salts are known, as attempted production of an Ir(IX) salt such as IrO_{4}SbF_{6} did not result in anything.
