= Iridium disulfide =

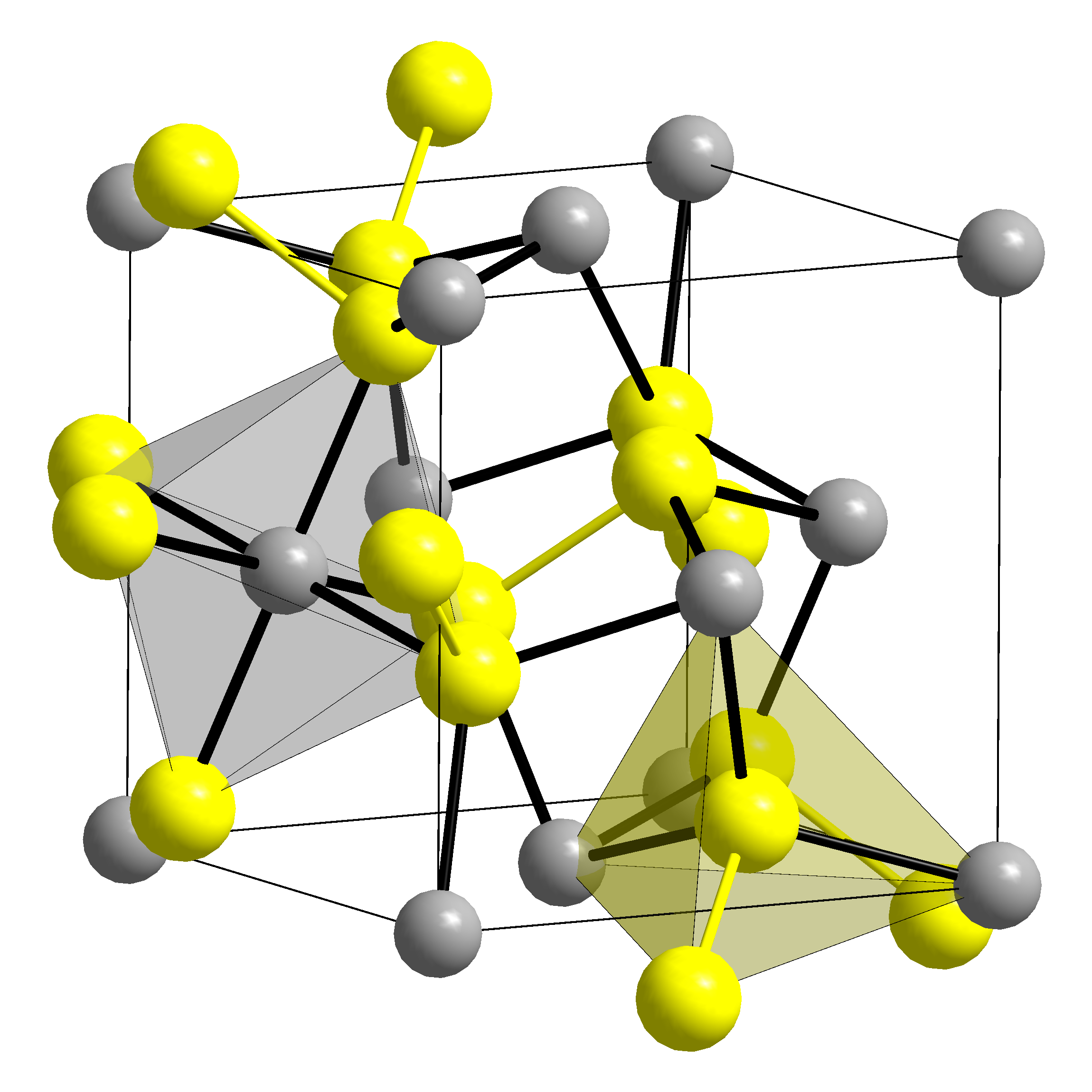

Identifiers
CAS Number	12030-51-2
3D model (JSmol)	Interactive image
ChemSpider	103869853
PubChem CID	154116933
- InChI: InChI=1S/Ir.2S Key: DUFDGYWNCWKJSM-UHFFFAOYSA-N
- SMILES: [S]=[Ir]=[S]

Properties
Chemical formula	IrS_{2}
Molar mass	256.349
Density	9300 kg m^{–3}
- Except where otherwise noted, data are given for materials in their standard state (at 25 °C [77 °F], 100 kPa). Infobox references

Iridium disulfide is the binary inorganic compound with the formula IrS_{2}. Prepared by the direct reaction of the elements, the compound adopts the pyrite crystal structure at high pressure. At normal atmospheric pressures, an orthorhombic polymorph is observed. The high- and low-pressure forms both feature octahedral Ir centers, but the S–S distances are pressure dependent. Although not practical, IrS_{2} is a highly active catalyst for hydrodesulfurization.
