= Iridium tetrafluoride =

Iridium(IV) fluoride
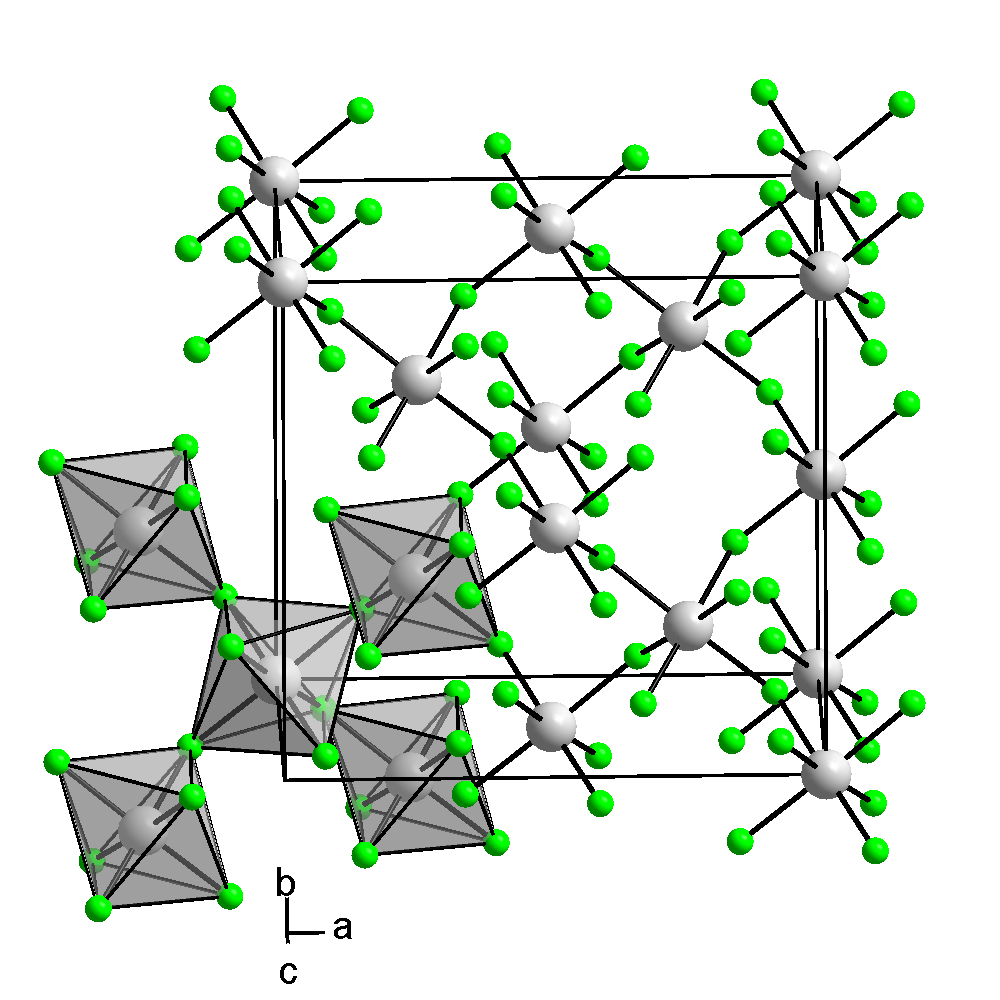

Names
- Other names Iridium tetrafluoride

Identifiers
| CAS Number | 37501-24-9 |
| 3D model (JSmol) | Interactive image |
| ChemSpider | 103874710 |
| PubChem CID | 15771758 |
- InChI: InChI=1S/4FH.Ir/h4*1H;/q;;;;+4/p-4 Key: WOJCGZMITDEZTA-UHFFFAOYSA-J
- SMILES: F[Ir](F)(F)F

Properties
| Chemical formula | IrF_{4} |
| Molar mass | 268.2109 g/mol |
| Appearance | dark brown solid |

Related compounds
| Other anions | Iridium dioxide |
| Other cations | Sodium fluoride; Potassium fluoride; Caesium fluoride; Calcium fluoride |
| Related compounds | Iridium(V) fluoride; Iridium(VI) fluoride; Rhodium(IV) fluoride |
- Except where otherwise noted, data are given for materials in their standard state (at 25 °C [77 °F], 100 kPa). verify (what is ?) Infobox references

Iridium(IV) fluoride is a chemical compound of iridium and fluorine, with the chemical formula IrF_{4} and is a dark brown solid. Early reports of IrF_{4} prior to 1965 are questionable and appear to describe the compound IrF_{5}. The solid can be prepared by reduction of IrF_{5} with iridium black or reduction with H_{2} in aqueous HF. The crystal structure of the solid is notable as it was the first example of a three-dimensional lattice structure found for a metal tetrafluoride and subsequently RhF_{4}, PdF_{4} and PtF_{4} have been found to have the same structure. The structure has 6 coordinate, octahedral, iridium where two edges of the octahedra are shared and the two unshared fluorine atoms are cis to one another.
