= Iridium(V) fluoride =

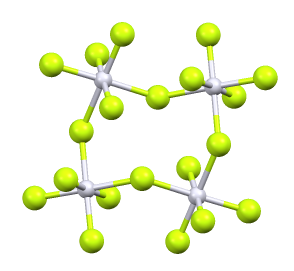

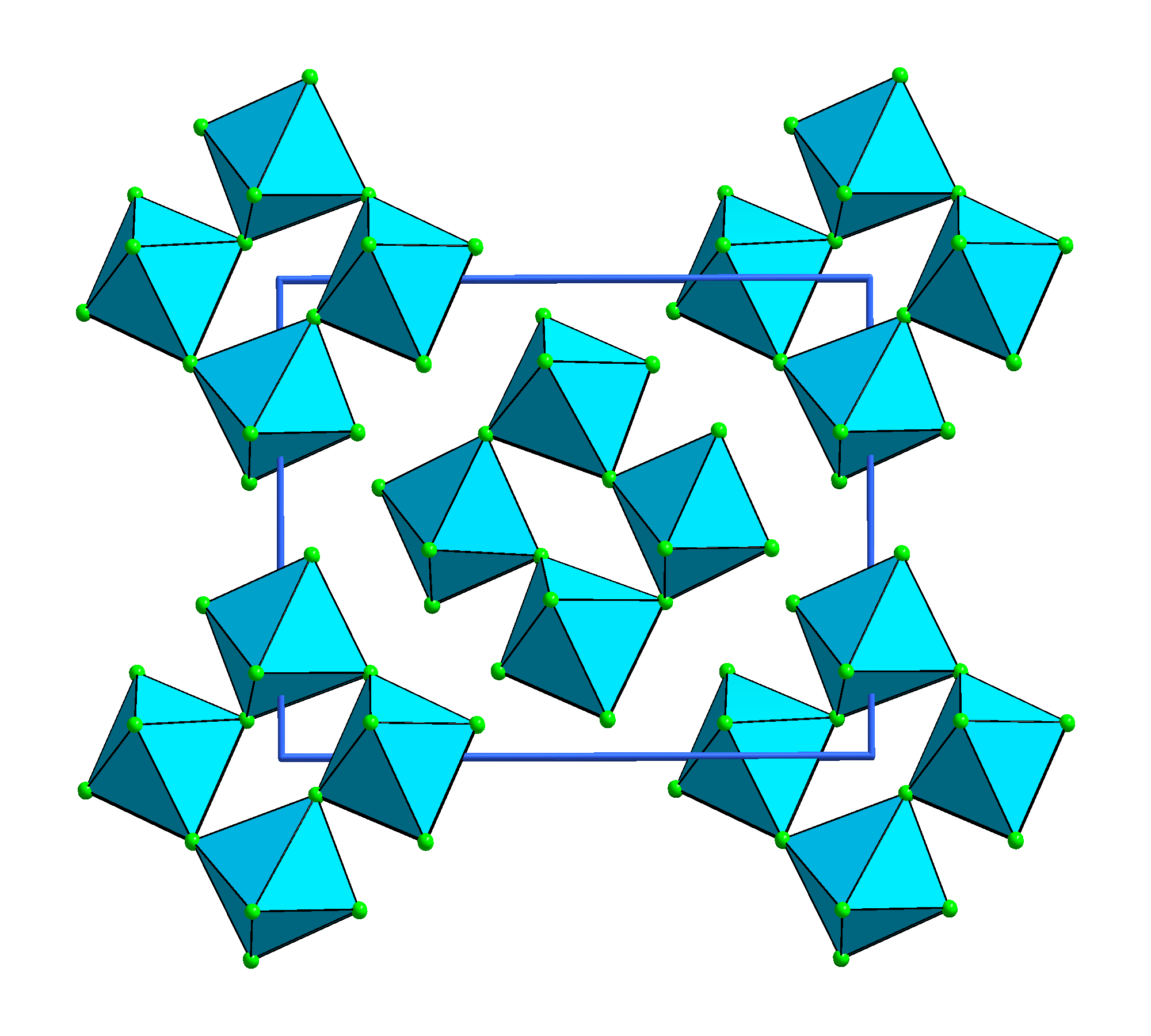

Names
- Other names Iridium pentafluoride

Identifiers
| CAS Number | 14568-19-5 |
| 3D model (JSmol) | monomer: Interactive image; tetramer: Interactive image |
| CompTox Dashboard (EPA) | DTXSID401045558 |
- InChI: InChI=1S/5FH.Ir/h5*1H;/q;;;;;+5/p-5 Key: AVEYGPFFIPYHQT-UHFFFAOYSA-I
- SMILES: monomer: F[Ir](F)(F)(F)F; tetramer: F[Ir-]1(F)(F)(F)[F+][Ir-](F)(F)(F)(F)[F+][Ir-](F)(F)(F)(F)[F+][Ir-](F)(F)(F)(F)[F+]1

Properties
| Chemical formula | IrF_{5} |
| Molar mass | 287.209 g/mol |
| Appearance | yellow solid |
| Melting point | 104.5 °C (220.1 °F; 377.6 K) |

Related compounds
| Other cations | Rhodium(V) fluoride, Osmium pentafluoride, Platinum(V) fluoride |
| Related compounds | Iridium(IV) fluoride, Iridium hexafluoride |
- Except where otherwise noted, data are given for materials in their standard state (at 25 °C [77 °F], 100 kPa). verify (what is ?) Infobox references

Iridium(V) fluoride, IrF_{5}, is a chemical compound of iridium and fluorine. A highly reactive yellow low melting solid, it has a tetrameric structure, Ir_{4}F_{20}, which contains octahedrally coordinated iridium atoms. This structure is shared with RuF_{5} and OsF_{5}. It can be prepared by the controlled decomposition of IrF_{6} or the reduction of IrF_{6} with silicon powder or H_{2} in anhydrous HF.

2IrF_{6} + H_{2} → 2IrF_{5} + 2HF
4IrF_{6} + Si → 4IrF_{5} + SiF_{4}

== See also ==
- Iridium(VI) fluoride
- Iridium(IV) fluoride
