= Ammonium hexachloroiridate(IV) =

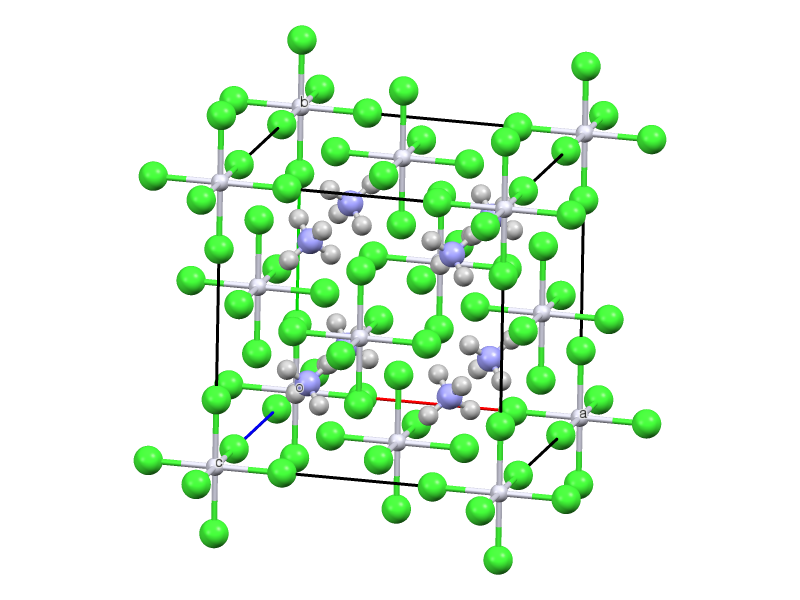

Names
- IUPAC name Ammonium hexachloroiridate(IV)

Identifiers
CAS Number	16940-92-4
3D model (JSmol)	Interactive image
ChEBI	CHEBI:60132
ChemSpider	10791939
ECHA InfoCard	100.037.264
EC Number	241-007-0
PubChem CID	16211476
CompTox Dashboard (EPA)	DTXSID70937632
- InChI: InChI=1S/6ClH.Ir.2H3N/h6*1H;;2*1H3/q;;;;;;+4;;/p-4 Key: LWNOUTCTZQNGEN-UHFFFAOYSA-J
- SMILES: [NH4+].[NH4+].Cl[Ir-2](Cl)(Cl)(Cl)(Cl)Cl

Properties
Chemical formula	Cl_{6}H_{8}IrN_{2}
Molar mass	441.00 g·mol^{−1}
Appearance	red solid

Hazards
- GHS labelling
Pictograms	(GHS05: Corrosive) (GHS07: Exclamation mark) (GHS09: Environmental hazard)
Signal word	Danger
Hazard statements	H290, H302, H312, H317, H318, H332, H411
Precautionary statements	P234, P261, P264, P264+P265, P270, P271, P272, P273, P280, P301+P317, P302+P352, P304+P340, P305+P354+P338, P317, P321, P330, P333+P317, P362+P364, P390, P391, P501
- Except where otherwise noted, data are given for materials in their standard state (at 25 °C [77 °F], 100 kPa). Infobox references

Ammonium hexachloroiridate(IV) is the inorganic compound with the formula (NH_{4})_{2}[IrCl_{6}]. This dark red solid is the ammonium salt of the iridium(IV) complex [IrCl_{6}]^{2−}. It is a commercially important iridium compound, one of the most common complexes of iridium(IV). A related but ill-defined compound is iridium tetrachloride, which has been used interchangeably.

== Structure and synthesis ==
The compound has been characterized by X-ray crystallography. The salt crystallizes in a cubic motif like that of ammonium hexachloroplatinate. The [IrCl_{6}]^{2−} centers adopt octahedral molecular geometry.

The compound is prepared in the laboratory by the addition of ammonium chloride to an aqueous solution of sodium hexachloroiridate. The salt is poorly soluble like most other diammonium hexachlorometallates.

== Uses ==
It is an intermediate in the isolation of iridium from ores. Most other metals form insoluble sulfides when aqueous solutions of their chlorides are treated with hydrogen sulfide, but [IrCl_{6}]^{2−} resists ligand substitution. Upon heating under hydrogen, the solid salt converts to the metal:

(NH_{4})_{2}[IrCl_{6}] + 2 H_{2} → Ir + 6 HCl + 2 NH_{3}

== Bonding ==
The electronic structure of ammonium hexachloroiridate(IV) has attracted much attention. Its magnetic moment is less than that calculated for one electron. This result is attributed to antiferromagnetic coupling between Ir centers mediated by Cl---Cl interactions. Electron spin resonance studies reveal that more than half of the spin density resides on chloride, thus the description of the complex as Ir(IV) is an oversimplification.
