= Iridium hexafluoride =

- Iridium(VI) fluoride

Names
- IUPAC name iridium(VI) fluoride
- Other names iridium hexafluoride

Identifiers
CAS Number	7783-75-7
3D model (JSmol)	Interactive image
ChemSpider	10323846
ECHA InfoCard	100.029.113
PubChem CID	3014587
UNII	UP14U33TGX
- InChI: InChI=1S/6FH.Ir/h6*1H;/q;;;;;;+6/p-6 Key: JQAZQSHUPWSSPF-UHFFFAOYSA-H; InChI=1/6FH.Ir/h6*1H;/q;;;;;;+6/p-6/rF6Ir/c1-7(2,3,4,5)6 Key: JQAZQSHUPWSSPF-VYYYRSGCAJ
- SMILES: F[Ir](F)(F)(F)(F)F

Properties
Chemical formula	IrF_{6}
Molar mass	306.22 g/mol
Appearance	yellow crystalline solid
Density	5.11g/mL
Melting point	44 °C (111 °F; 317 K)
Boiling point	53.6 °C (128.5 °F; 326.8 K)
Solubility	soluble in HF

Hazards
- GHS labelling
Pictograms	(GHS05: Corrosive)
Signal word	Danger
Hazard statements	H290, H314
Precautionary statements	P234, P260, P264, P280, P301+P330+P331, P302+P361+P354, P304+P340, P305+P354+P338, P316, P321, P363, P390, P405, P501

Related compounds
Other cations	rhodium hexafluoride osmium hexafluoride platinum hexafluoride
Related compounds	iridium(V) fluoride
- Except where otherwise noted, data are given for materials in their standard state (at 25 °C [77 °F], 100 kPa). verify (what is ?) Infobox references

Iridium hexafluoride, also iridium(VI) fluoride, (IrF_{6}) is a compound of iridium and fluorine and one of the seventeen known binary hexafluorides. It is one of only a few compounds with iridium in the oxidation state +6.

== Synthesis ==
Iridium hexafluoride is made by a direct reaction of iridium metal in an excess of elemental fluorine gas at 300 °C. However, it is thermally unstable and must be frozen out of the gaseous reaction mixture to avoid dissociation.

Ir + 3 F_{2} → IrF_{6}

== Description ==
Iridium hexafluoride is a yellow crystalline solid that melts at 44 °C and boils at 53.6 °C. The solid structure measured at −140 °C is orthorhombic space group Pnma. Lattice parameters are a = 9.411 Å, b = 8.547 Å, and c = 4.952 Å. There are four formula units (in this case, discrete molecules) per unit cell, giving a density of 5.11 g·cm^{−3}.

The IrF_{6} molecule itself (the form important for the liquid or gas phase) has octahedral molecular geometry, which has point group (O_{h}). The Ir–F bond length is 1.833 Å.

Calculations suggest that fluorine might react with iridium hexafluoride at 39 GPa to form IrF_{8}.

It is able to oxidize elemental chlorine to the blue-colored salt Cl_{4}IrF_{6} (containing Cl_{4}^{+}, originally misidentified as Cl_{2}^{+}), in a process somewhat analogous to the oxidation of elemental oxygen by PtF_{6} (which yields the O_{2}^{+} containing O_{2}PtF_{6}).
