= Carbon compounds =

Chemical substances containing carbon

Carbon compounds are chemical substances containing carbon. More compounds of carbon exist than any other chemical element except for hydrogen. Organic carbon compounds are far more numerous than inorganic carbon compounds. In general bonds of carbon with other elements are covalent bonds. Carbon is tetravalent but carbon free radicals and carbenes occur as short-lived intermediates. Ions of carbon are carbocations and carbanions are also short-lived. An important carbon property is catenation as the ability to form long carbon chains and rings.

== Allotropes of carbon ==
The known inorganic chemistry of the allotropes of carbon (diamond, graphite, and the fullerenes) blossomed with the discovery of buckminsterfullerene in 1985, as additional fullerenes and their various derivatives were discovered. One such class of derivatives is inclusion compounds, in which an ion is enclosed by the all-carbon shell of the fullerene. This inclusion is denoted by the "@"symbol in endohedral fullerenes. For example, an ion consisting of a lithium ion trapped within buckminsterfullerene would be denoted Li^{+}@C_{60}. As with any other ionic compound, this complex ion could in principle pair with a counterion to form a salt. Other elements are also incorporated in so-called graphite intercalation compounds.

== Carbides ==
Carbides are binary compounds of carbon with an element that is less electronegative than it. The most important are Al_{4}C_{3}, B_{4}C, CaC_{2}, Fe_{3}C, HfC, SiC, TaC, TiC, and WC.

Metal	Structure of pure metal	Metallic radius (pm)	MC metal atom packing	MC structure	M_{2}C metal atom packing	M_{2}C structure	Other carbides
titanium	HCP (hexagonal close-packed)	147	FCC	rock salt			
zirconium	HCP (hexagonal close-packed)	160	FCC	rock salt			
hafnium	HCP (hexagonal close-packed)	159	FCC	rock salt			
vanadium	BCC (body-centred cubic)	134	FCC	rock salt	HCP	h/2	V_{4}C_{3}
niobium	BCC (body-centred cubic)	146	FCC	rock salt	HCP	h/2	Nb_{4}C_{3}
tantalum	BCC (body-centred cubic)	146	FCC	rock salt	HCP	h/2	Ta_{4}C_{3}
molybdenum	BCC (body-centred cubic)	139		hexagonal	HCP	h/2	Mo_{3}C_{2}
tungsten	BCC (body-centred cubic)	139		hexagonal	HCP	h/2	
chromium	BCC (body-centred cubic)	128					Cr_{23}C_{6}, Cr_{3}C, Cr_{7}C_{3}, Cr_{3}C_{2}

== Organic compounds ==
It was once thought that organic compounds could only be created by living organisms. Over time, however, scientists learned how to synthesize organic compounds in the lab. The number of organic compounds is immense and the known number of defined compounds is close to 10 million. However, an indefinitely large number of such compounds is theoretically possible. By definition, an organic compound must contain at least one atom of carbon, but this criterion is not generally regarded as sufficient. Indeed, the distinction between organic and inorganic compounds is ultimately a matter of convention, and there are several compounds that have been classified either way, such as: COCl_{2}, CSCl_{2}, CS(NH_{2})_{2}, CO(NH_{2})_{2}. With carbon bonded to metals the field of organic chemistry crosses over into organometallic chemistry.

=== Carbon-oxygen compounds ===
There are many oxides of carbon (oxocarbons), of which the most common are carbon dioxide (CO_{2}) and carbon monoxide (CO). Other less known oxides include carbon suboxide (C_{3}O_{2}) and mellitic anhydride (C_{12}O_{9}). There are also numerous unstable or elusive oxides, such as dicarbon monoxide (C_{2}O), oxalic anhydride (C_{2}O_{4}), and carbon trioxide (CO_{3}).

There are several oxocarbon anions, negative ions that consist solely of oxygen and carbon. The most common are the carbonate (CO_{3}^{2−}) and oxalate (C_{2}O_{4}^{2−}). The corresponding acids are the highly unstable carbonic acid (H_{2}CO_{3}) and the quite stable oxalic acid (H_{2}C_{2}O_{4}), respectively. These anions can be partially deprotonated to give the bicarbonate (HCO_{3}^{−}) and hydrogenoxalate (HC_{2}O_{4}^{−}). Other more exotic carbon–oxygen anions exist, such as acetylenedicarboxylate (O_{2}C–C≡C–CO_{2}^{2−}), mellitate (C_{12}O_{9}^{6−}), squarate (C_{4}O_{4}^{2−}), and rhodizonate (C_{6}O_{6}^{2−}). The anhydrides of some of these acids are oxides of carbon; carbon dioxide, for instance, can be seen as the anhydride of carbonic acid.

Some important carbonates are Ag_{2}CO_{3}, BaCO_{3}, CaCO_{3}, CdCO_{3}, Ce_{2}(CO_{3})_{3}, CoCO_{3}, Cs_{2}CO_{3}, CuCO_{3}, FeCO_{3}, K_{2}CO_{3}, La_{2}(CO_{3})_{3}, Li_{2}CO_{3}, MgCO_{3}, MnCO_{3}, (NH_{4})_{2}CO_{3}, Na_{2}CO_{3}, NiCO_{3}, PbCO_{3}, SrCO_{3}, and ZnCO_{3}.

The most important bicarbonates include NH_{4}HCO_{3}, Ca(HCO_{3})_{2}, KHCO_{3}, and NaHCO_{3}.

The most important oxalates include Ag_{2}C_{2}O_{4}, BaC_{2}O_{4}, CaC_{2}O_{4}, Ce_{2}(C_{2}O_{4})_{3}, K_{2}C_{2}O_{4}, and Na_{2}C_{2}O_{4}.

Carbonyls are coordination complexes between transition metals and carbonyl ligands. Metal carbonyls are complexes that are formed with the neutral ligand CO. These complexes are covalent. Here is a list of some carbonyls: Cr(CO)_{6}, Co_{2}(CO)_{8}, Fe(CO)_{5}, Mn_{2}(CO)_{10}, Mo(CO)_{6}, Ni(CO)_{4}, W(CO)_{6}.

=== Carbon-sulfur compounds ===
Important inorganic carbon-sulfur compounds are the carbon sulfides carbon disulfide (CS_{2}) and carbonyl sulfide (OCS). Carbon monosulfide (CS) unlike carbon monoxide is very unstable. Important compound classes are thiocarbonates, thiocarbamates, dithiocarbamates and trithiocarbonates.

carbon monosulfide	carbon disulfide	carbonyl sulfide
Inorganic carbon-sulfur compounds

=== Carbon-nitrogen compounds ===
Small inorganic carbon–nitrogen compounds are cyanogen, hydrogen cyanide, cyanamide, isocyanic acid and cyanogen chloride.

Inorganic carbon-nitrogen compounds
Name	Formula	Structure	Molar mass (g/mole)	Boiling point °C	Melting point °C
cyanogen	(CN)_{2}	Cyanogen	52.03	−21	−28
hydrogen cyanide	HCN	Hydrogen-cyanide	27.03	25–26	−12 to −14
cyanamide	CN_{2}H_{2}	Cyanamide	42.04	260 (decomp.)	44
isocyanic acid	HNCO	isocyanic acid	43.03	23.5	−86
cyanogen chloride	CNCl	cyanogen chloride	61.47	13	−6
chlorosulfonyl isocyanate	CNClO_{3}S	Chlorosulfonyl isocyanate	141.53	107	−44
cyanuric chloride	(NCCl)_{3}	cyanuric chloride	184.41	192	154

Paracyanogen is the polymerization product of cyanogen. Cyanuric chloride is the trimer of cyanogen chloride and 2-cyanoguanidine is the dimer of cyanamide.

Other types of inorganic compounds include the inorganic salts and complexes of the carbon-containing cyanide, cyanate, fulminate, thiocyanate and cyanamide ions. Examples of cyanides are copper cyanide (CuCN) and potassium cyanide (KCN), examples of cyanates are potassium cyanate (KNCO) and silver cyanate (AgNCO), examples of fulminates are silver fulminate (AgOCN) and mercury fulminate (HgOCN) and an example of a thiocyanate is potassium thiocyanate (KSCN).

== Carbon halides ==
The common carbon halides are carbon tetrafluoride (CF_{4}), carbon tetrachloride (CCl_{4}), carbon tetrabromide (CBr_{4}), carbon tetraiodide (CI_{4}), and a large number of other carbon-halogen compounds.

== Carboranes ==
A carborane is a cluster composed of boron and carbon atoms such as H_{2}C_{2}B_{10}H_{10}.

== Alloys ==
There are hundreds of alloys that contain carbon. The most common of these alloys is steel, sometimes called "carbon steel" (see Category:Steels). All kinds of steel contain some amount of carbon, by definition, and all ferrous alloys contain some carbon.

Some other common alloys that are based on iron and carbon include anthracite iron, cast iron, pig iron, and wrought iron.

In more technical uses, there are also spiegeleisen, an alloy of iron, manganese, and carbon; and stellite, an alloy of cobalt, chromium, tungsten, and carbon.

Whether it was placed there deliberately or not, some traces of carbon is also found in these common metals and their alloys: aluminium, chromium, magnesium, molybdenum, niobium, thorium, titanium, tungsten, uranium, vanadium, zinc, and zirconium. For example, many of these metals are smelted with coke, a form of carbon; and aluminium and magnesium are made in electrolytic cells with carbon electrodes. Some distribution of carbon into all of these metals is inevitable.
