= Vanadium hexacarbonyl =

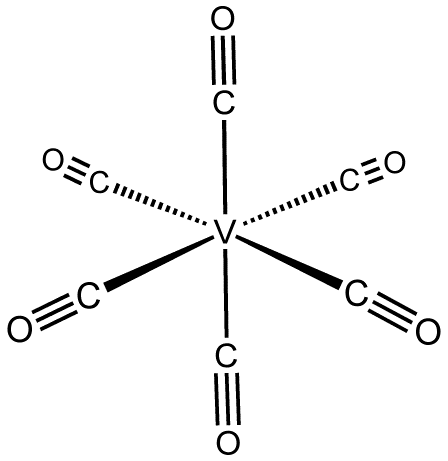
- Vanadium hexacarbonyl

Names
- IUPAC name hexacarbonylvanadium(0)

Identifiers
| CAS Number | 20644-87-5 |
| 3D model (JSmol) | Interactive image |
| ChEBI | CHEBI:37857 |
| ChemSpider | 453410 |
| ECHA InfoCard | 100.039.928 |
| EC Number | 243-937-2 |
| Gmelin Reference | 3893 |
| PubChem CID | 6097005 |
| UNII | WA8Q7FLK2X |
- InChI: InChI=1S/6CO.V/c6*1-2; Key: BVSRFQDQORQURQ-UHFFFAOYSA-N
- SMILES: O=C=[V](=C=O)(=C=O)(=C=O)(=C=O)=C=O

Properties
| Chemical formula | C_{6}O_{6}V |
| Molar mass | 219.00 g/mol |
| Appearance | blue-green crystals yellow solutions |
| Density | 1.7 g/cm^{3} |
| Melting point | decomposes |
| Boiling point | sublimes at 50 °C (122 °F; 323 K) (15 mmHg) |
| Solubility in water | insoluble |
| Solubility in other solvents | 5 g/L hexane; more soluble in dichloromethane |

Structure
| Crystal structure | orthorhombic |
| Coordination geometry | octahedral |
| Dipole moment | 0 D |

Hazards
- Occupational safety and health (OHS/OSH)
| Main hazards | CO source |
- GHS labelling
| Pictograms | (GHS06: Toxic) |
| Signal word | Danger |
| Hazard statements | H301, H330 |
| Precautionary statements | P260, P264, P270, P271, P284, P301+P316, P304+P340, P316, P320, P321, P330, P403+P233, P405, P501 |

Related compounds
| Related compounds | Chromium hexacarbonyl; Molybdenum hexacarbonyl; Tungsten hexacarbonyl; Seaborgium hexacarbonyl; Dimanganese decacarbonyl; Dirhenium decacarbonyl; Iron pentacarbonyl; Diiron nonacarbonyl; Triruthenium dodecacarbonyl; Triosmium dodecacarbonyl; Dicobalt octacarbonyl; Tetrarhodium dodecacarbonyl; Tetrairidium dodecacarbonyl; Nickel tetracarbonyl |
- Except where otherwise noted, data are given for materials in their standard state (at 25 °C [77 °F], 100 kPa). verify (what is ?) Infobox references

Vanadium hexacarbonyl is the inorganic compound with the formula V(CO)_{6}. It is a blue-black volatile solid. This highly reactive species is noteworthy from theoretical perspectives as a rare isolable homoleptic metal carbonyl that is paramagnetic. Most species with the formula M_{x}(CO)_{y} follow the 18-electron rule, whereas V(CO)_{6} has 17 valence electrons.

== Structure ==
V(CO)_{6} adopts an octahedral coordination geometry and is isostructural with chromium hexacarbonyl, even though they have differing valence electron counts. High resolution X-ray crystallography indicates that the molecule is slightly distorted with two (axial) shorter V–C distances of 1.993(2) Å vs. four (equatorial) 2.005(2) Å. Even though V(−I) is a larger ion than V(0), the V–C distances in V(CO)^{−}_{6} are 0.07 Å shorter than in the neutral precursor.

== Synthesis ==
According to the original synthesis by Calderazzo, V(CO)_{6} is prepared in two-steps via the intermediacy of V(CO)^{−}_{6}. In the first step, VCl_{3} is reduced with metallic sodium under 200 atm CO at 160 °C. The solvent for this reduction is typically diglyme, CH_{3}OCH_{2}CH_{2}OCH_{2}CH_{2}OCH_{3}. This triether solubilizes sodium salts, akin to the behavior of a crown ether:

4 Na + VCl_{3} + 6 CO + 2 diglyme → [Na(diglyme)_{2}][V(CO)_{6}] + 3 NaCl

The resulting anion is oxidized with acid:

2 V(CO)^{−}_{6} + 2 H_{3}PO_{4} → 2 V(CO)_{6} + H_{2} + 2 H_{2}PO^{−}_{4}

== Reactions ==
Vanadium hexacarbonyl is thermally unstable. Its primary reaction is reduction to the monoanion V(CO)^{−}_{6}, salts of which are well studied. It is also susceptible to substitution by tertiary phosphine ligands, often leading to disproportionation.

V(CO)_{6} reacts with sources of the cyclopentadienyl anion to give the orange four-legged piano stool complex (C_{5}H_{5})V(CO)_{4} (m.p. 136 °C). Like many charge-neutral organometallic compounds, this half-sandwich species is volatile. In the original preparation of this species, C_{5}H_{5}HgCl was employed as the source of C_{5}H^{−}_{5}.
