= Carbonyl metallurgy =

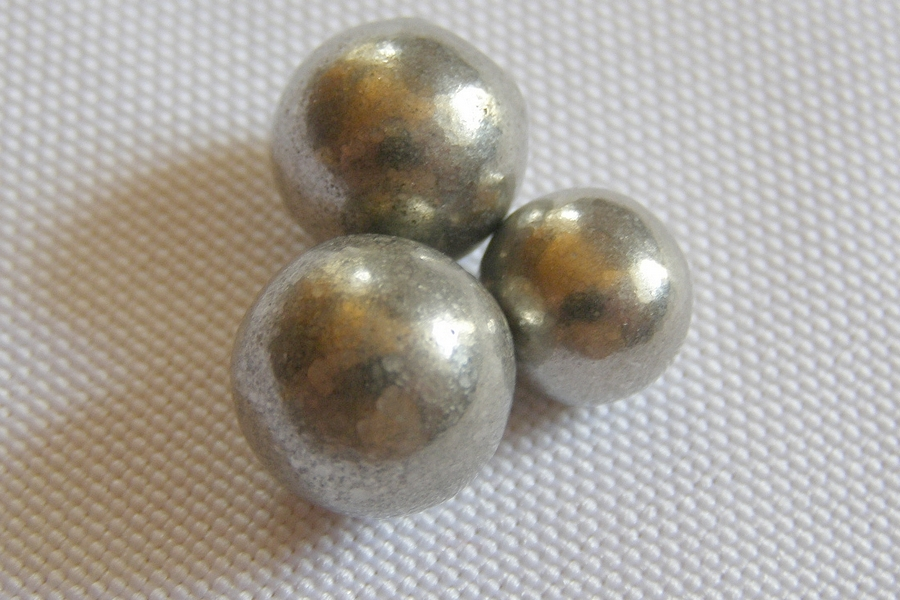
Spheres of nickel made by the Mond process

Carbonyl metallurgy is used to manufacture products of iron, nickel, steel, and other metals. Coatings are produced by vapor plating using metal carbonyl vapors. These are metal-ligand complexes where carbon monoxide is bonded to individual atoms of metals .

Iron carbonyl is stable as iron pentacarbonyl, where five carbon monoxide molecules are pendently bonded to the iron atom, while nickel carbonyl is stable as nickel tetracarbonyl, which has four carbon monoxide molecules pendantly bonded to the nickel atom. Both can be formed by the exposure of the powdered metal to carbon monoxide gas at temperatures of around 75 degrees Celsius. Both the metal carbonyls decompose near 175 °C, resulting in a vapor plated metallic coating. The thickness of the vapor plated deposit can be increased to desired thicknesses by controlling the amount of metal carbonyl used and the duration of the plating process.

Vale Inco produces over 100 million pounds (ca. 45000 tonnes) of nickel metal annually by the carbonyl process. The carbonyl process has been used to produce molds in custom shapes for industry. Such molds have been used in plastic molding and other manufacturing techniques. William Jenkin developed many of the techniques and procedures used in carbonyl metallurgy.

Carbonyl metallurgy is useful as a low-temperature metal coating technique that may find many applications in the future.

Nickel tetracarbonyl

Iron pentacarbonyl

== See also ==
- Chemical vapor deposition
