= Iron pentacarbonyl =

- Iron carbonyl

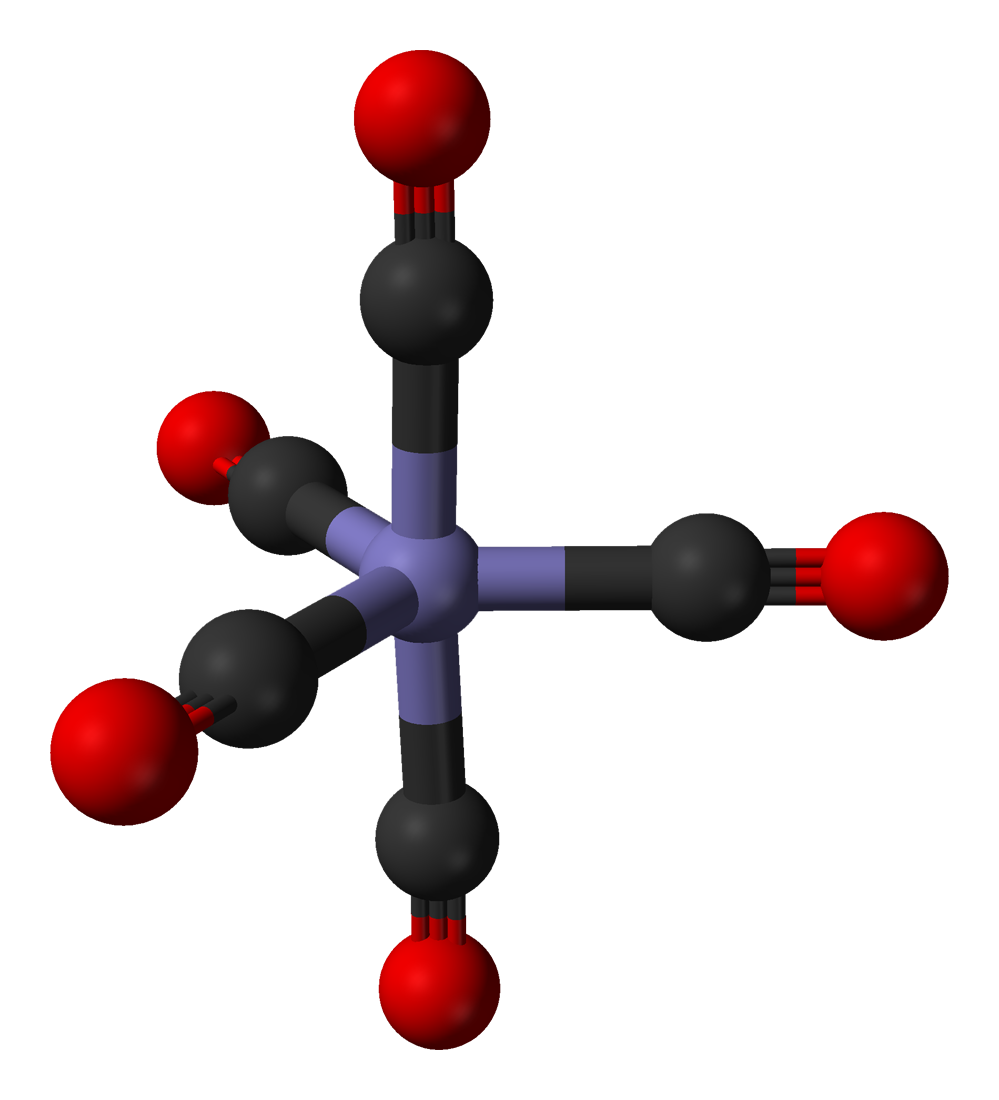
- Iron carbonyl

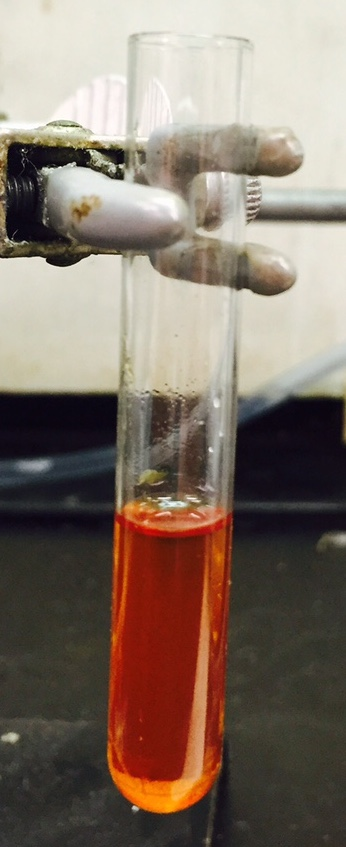
- Iron carbonyl sample

Names
- IUPAC name Pentacarbonyliron(0)
- Other names Pentacarbonyl iron Iron carbonyl

Identifiers
CAS Number	13463-40-6
3D model (JSmol)	Interactive image
ChEBI	CHEBI:30251
ChemSpider	24254
ECHA InfoCard	100.033.323
PubChem CID	26040
RTECS number	NO4900000
UNII	6WQ62TAQ6Z
UN number	1994
CompTox Dashboard (EPA)	DTXSID3027746
- InChI: InChI=1S/5CO.Fe/c5*1-2; Key: FYOFOKCECDGJBF-UHFFFAOYSA-N; InChI=1/5CO.Fe/c5*1-2; Key: FYOFOKCECDGJBF-UHFFFAOYAX
- SMILES: O=C=[Fe](=C=O)(=C=O)(=C=O)=C=O

Properties
Chemical formula	Fe(CO)_{5}
Molar mass	195.90 g/mol
Appearance	straw-yellow to brilliant orange liquid
Odor	musty
Density	1.453 g/cm^{3}
Melting point	−21.0 °C (−5.8 °F; 252.2 K)
Boiling point	103 °C (217 °F; 376 K)
Solubility in water	Insoluble
Solubility	Soluble in organic solvents slightly soluble in alcohol insoluble in ammonia
Vapor pressure	40 mmHg (30.6 °C)
Refractive index (n_{D})	1.5196 (20 °C)

Structure
Point group	D_{3h}
Coordination geometry	trigonal bipyramidal
Molecular shape	trigonal bipyramidal
Dipole moment	0 D

Hazards
- Occupational safety and health (OHS/OSH)
Main hazards	Very toxic, highly flammable
- GHS labelling
Pictograms	(GHS02: Flammable) (GHS06: Toxic) (GHS08: Health hazard)
NFPA 704 (fire diamond)	4 3 1
Flash point	−15 °C (5 °F; 258 K)
Autoignition temperature	49 °C (120 °F; 322 K)
Explosive limits	3.7–12.5%
- Lethal dose or concentration (LD, LC)
LD_{50} (median dose)	25 mg/kg (rat, oral)
- NIOSH (US health exposure limits)
PEL (Permissible)	none
REL (Recommended)	TWA 0.1 ppm (0.23 mg/m^{3}) ST 0.2 ppm (0.45 mg/m^{3})
IDLH (Immediate danger)	0.4 ppm
Safety data sheet (SDS)	ICSC 0168

Related compounds
Related compounds	Chromium hexacarbonyl; Molybdenum hexacarbonyl; Tungsten hexacarbonyl; Seaborgium hexacarbonyl; Vanadium hexacarbonyl; Dimanganese decacarbonyl; Dirhenium decacarbonyl; Diiron nonacarbonyl; Triruthenium dodecacarbonyl; Triosmium dodecacarbonyl; Dicobalt octacarbonyl; Tetrarhodium dodecacarbonyl; Tetrairidium dodecacarbonyl; Nickel tetracarbonyl
- Except where otherwise noted, data are given for materials in their standard state (at 25 °C [77 °F], 100 kPa). verify (what is ?) Infobox references

Iron pentacarbonyl, also known as iron carbonyl, is the compound with formula Fe(CO)_{5}. Under standard conditions Fe(CO)_{5} is a free-flowing, straw-colored liquid with a pungent odour. Older samples appear darker. This compound is a common precursor to diverse iron compounds, including many that are useful in small scale organic synthesis.

== Properties ==
Iron pentacarbonyl is a homoleptic metal carbonyl, where carbon monoxide is the only ligand complexed with a metal. Other examples include octahedral chromium hexacarbonyl (Cr(CO)_{6}) and tetrahedral nickel carbonyl (Ni(CO)_{4}). Most metal carbonyls have 18 valence electrons, and Fe(CO)_{5} fits this pattern with 8 valence electrons on Fe and five pairs of electrons provided by the CO ligands. Reflecting its symmetrical structure and charge neutrality, Fe(CO)_{5} is volatile; it is one of the most frequently encountered liquid metal complexes. Fe(CO)_{5} adopts a trigonal bipyramidal structure with the Fe atom surrounded by five CO ligands: three in equatorial positions and two axially bound. The Fe–C–O linkages are each linear.

Fe(CO)_{5} exhibits a relatively low rate of interchange between the axial and equatorial CO groups via the Berry mechanism. It is characterized by two intense ν_{CO} bands in the IR spectrum at 2034 and 2014 cm^{−1} (gas phase).

== Synthesis and other iron carbonyls ==
Fe(CO)_{5} is produced by the reaction of fine iron particles with carbon monoxide. The compound was described in a journal by Mond and Langer in 1891 as "a somewhat viscous liquid of a pale-yellow colour." Samples were prepared by treatment of finely divided, oxide-free iron powder with carbon monoxide at room temperature.

Industrial synthesis of the compound requires relatively high temperatures and pressures (e.g. 175 atm at 150 °C) as well as specialized, chemically resistant equipment (e.g. composed of copper-silver alloys). Preparation of the compound at the laboratory scale avoids these complications by using an iodide intermediate:

1. FeI_{2} + 4 CO → Fe(CO)_{4}I_{2}
2. 5 Fe(CO)_{4}I_{2} + 10 Cu → 10 CuI + 4 Fe(CO)_{5} + Fe

== Industrial production and use ==
The industrial production of this compound is somewhat similar to the Mond process in that the metal is treated with carbon monoxide to give a volatile gas. In the case of iron pentacarbonyl, the reaction is more sluggish. It is necessary to use iron sponge as the starting material, and harsher reaction conditions of 5–30 MPa of carbon monoxide and 150–200 °C. Similar to the Mond process, sulfur acts as a catalyst. The crude iron pentacarbonyl is purified by distillation. Ullmann's Encyclopedia of Industrial Chemistry reports that there are only three plants manufacturing pentacarbonyliron; BASF in Germany and American Carbonyl in Alabama have capacities of 9000 and 1500–2000 tonnes/year respectively.

Most iron pentacarbonyl produced is decomposed on site to give pure carbonyl iron in analogy to carbonyl nickel. Some iron pentacarbonyl is burned to give pure iron oxide. Other uses of pentacarbonyliron are small in comparison.

== Reactions ==
Many compounds are derived from Fe(CO)_{5} by substitution of CO by Lewis bases, L, to give derivatives Fe(CO)_{5−x}L_{x}. Illustrative is the synthesis of the bis(triphenylphosphine)iron tricarbonyl complex (Fe(CO)_{3}(P(C_{6}H_{5})_{3})_{2}). Common Lewis bases include isocyanides, tertiary phosphines and arsines, and alkenes. Usually these ligands displace only one or two CO ligands, but certain acceptor ligands such as PF_{3} and isocyanides can proceed to tetra- and pentasubstitution.

These reactions are often induced with a catalyst or light. In addition to the photochemical route, substitution can also induced by NaOH or NaBH_{4}. The catalyst attacks a CO ligand, which labilizes another CO ligand toward substitution. The electrophilicity of Fe(CO)_{4}L is less than that of Fe(CO)_{5}, so the nucleophilic catalyst, disengages and attacks another molecule of Fe(CO)_{5}.

=== Photochemical decarbonylation ===
Irradiation of Fe(CO)_{5} with UV produces Fe(CO)_{4}, which captures a variety of ligands to give adducts. Specifically, excitation of the metal-to-CO charge-transfer band induces CO photolysis, generating singlet and triplet coordinatively-unsaturated Fe(CO)_{4} with high quantum yield. Prolonged irradiation in gas phase may proceed to further CO detach until atomic Fe formation. In the absence of trapping substrates, Fe_{2}(CO)_{9} is produced.

=== Oxidation and reduction ===
Most metal carbonyls can be halogenated. Thus, treatment of Fe(CO)_{5} with iodine gives iron tetracarbonyl diiodide:

Fe(CO)_{5} + I_{2} → Fe(CO)_{4}I_{2} + CO

Reduction of Fe(CO)_{5} with Na gives Na_{2}Fe(CO)_{4}, "tetracarbonylferrate" also called Collman's reagent. The dianion is isoelectronic with Ni(CO)_{4} but highly nucleophilic.

=== Acid-base reactions ===
Fe(CO)_{5} is not readily protonated, but it is attacked by hydroxide. Treatment of Fe(CO)_{5} with aqueous base produces [HFe(CO)_{4}]^{−}, via the metallacarboxylate intermediate. The oxidation of this monoanion gives triiron dodecacarbonyl, Fe_{3}(CO)_{12}. Acidification of solutions of [HFe(CO)_{4}]^{−} gives iron tetracarbonyl dihydride, H_{2}Fe(CO)_{4}.

Likewise, Fe(CO)_{5} reacts with HgSO_{4} to give the polymer [HgFe(CO)_{4}]_{n}.

=== Diene adducts ===
Dienes react with Fe(CO)_{5} to give (diene)Fe(CO)_{3}, wherein two CO ligands have been replaced by two olefins. Many dienes undergo this reaction, e.g. norbornadiene and 1,3-butadiene. One of the more historically significant derivatives is cyclobutadieneiron tricarbonyl (C_{4}H_{4})Fe(CO)_{3}, where C_{4}H_{4} is the otherwise unstable cyclobutadiene.

Fe(CO)_{5} reacts in dicyclopentadiene to form [Fe(C_{5}H_{5})(CO)_{2}]_{2}, cyclopentadienyliron dicarbonyl dimer. This compound, called "Fp dimer" can be considered a hybrid of ferrocene and Fe(CO)_{5}, although in terms of its reactivity, it resembles neither.

== Other uses ==
In Europe, iron pentacarbonyl was once used as an anti-knock agent in petrol in place of tetraethyllead; it was produced by IG Farben and commercially marketed under the trade names, “Motolin” and “Monopolin”. Two more modern alternative fuel additives are ferrocene and methylcyclopentadienyl manganese tricarbonyl. Fe(CO)_{5} is used in the production of "carbonyl iron", a finely divided form of Fe, a material used in magnetic cores of high-frequency coils for radios and televisions and for manufacture of the active ingredients of some radar absorbent materials (e.g. iron ball paint). It is famous as a chemical precursor for the synthesis of various iron-based nanoparticles.

Iron pentacarbonyl has been found to be a strong flame speed inhibitor in oxygen based flames. A few hundred ppm of iron pentacarbonyl are known to reduce the flame speed of stoichiometric methane–air flame by almost 50%. However due to its toxic nature it has not been used widely as a flame retardant.

== Toxicity and hazards ==
Fe(CO)_{5} is toxic, which is of concern because of its volatility (vapour pressure: 21 millimetres of mercury (2.8 kPa) at 20 °C). If inhaled, iron pentacarbonyl may cause lung irritation, toxic pneumonitis, or pulmonary edema. Like other metal carbonyls, Fe(CO)_{5} is flammable. It is, however, considerably less toxic than nickel tetracarbonyl.

The National Institute for Occupational Safety and Health has set a recommended exposure limit for iron pentacarbonyl at 0.1 ppm (0.23 mg/m^{3}) over an eight-hour time-weighted average, and a short-term exposure limit at 0.2 ppm (0.45 mg/m^{3}).
