= Nickel tetracarbonyl =

Chemical compound

- Nickel carbonyl

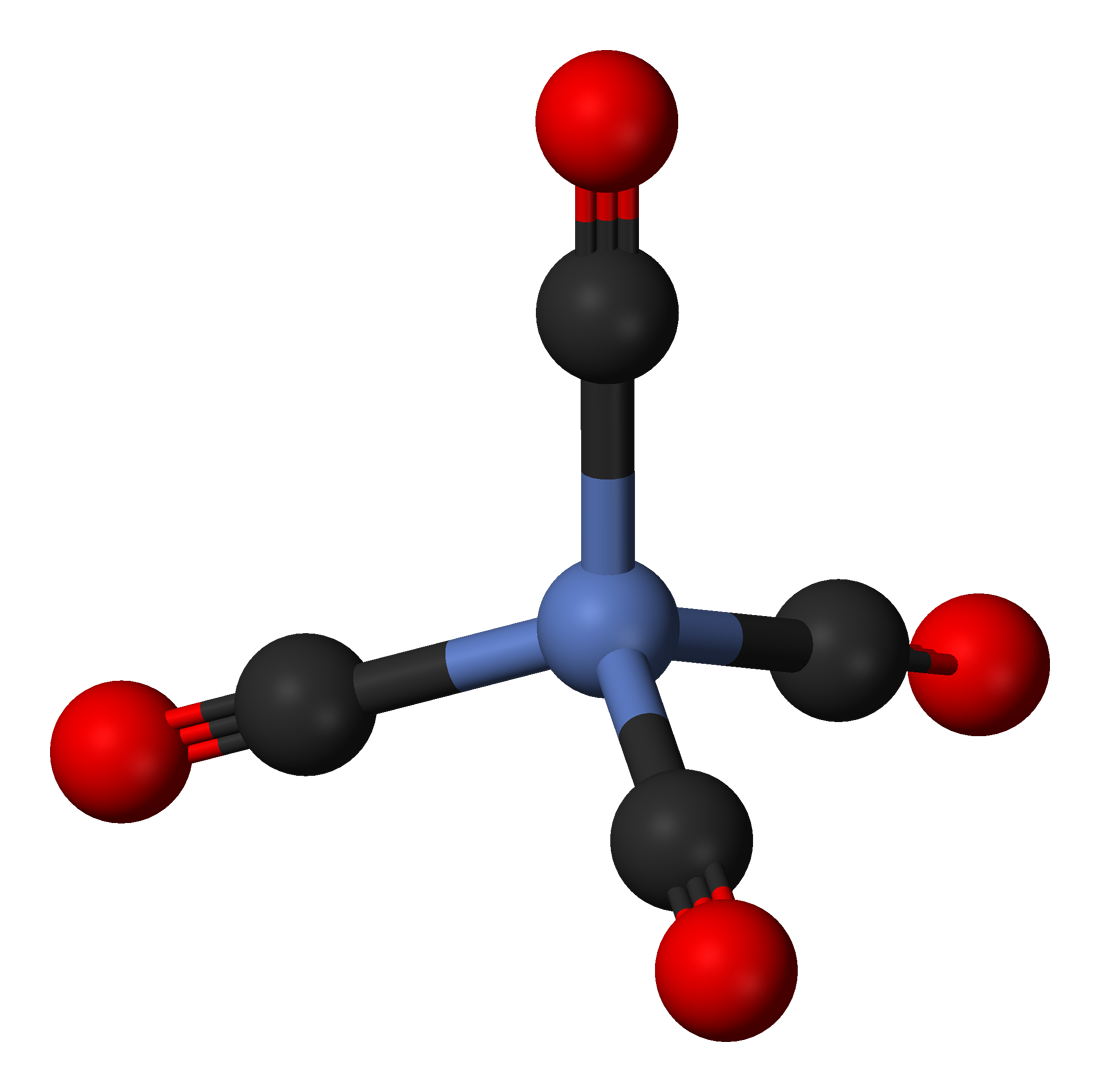
Nickel carbonyl
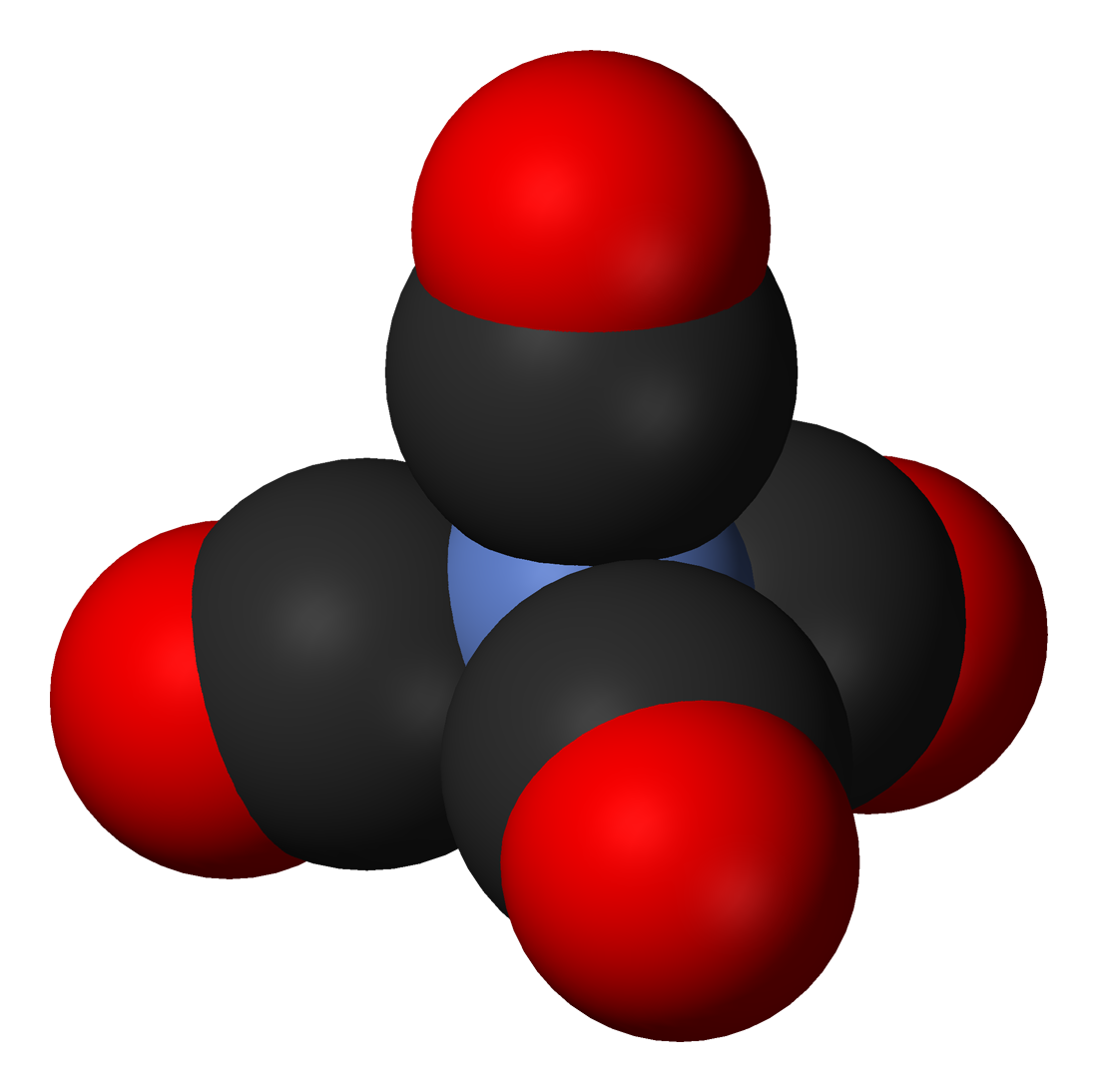
Nickel carbonyl

Names
- IUPAC name Tetracarbonylnickel
- Other names Nickel tetracarbonyl Nickel carbonyl (1:4)

Identifiers
CAS Number	13463-39-3
3D model (JSmol)	Interactive image
Beilstein Reference	6122797
ChEBI	CHEBI:30372
ChemSpider	24253
ECHA InfoCard	100.033.322
EC Number	236-669-2
Gmelin Reference	3135
PubChem CID	26039
RTECS number	QR6300000
UNII	1ZYL78UWZN
UN number	1259
CompTox Dashboard (EPA)	DTXSID0024212
- InChI: InChI=1S/4CO.Ni/c4*1-2; Key: AWDHUGLHGCVIEG-UHFFFAOYSA-N; InChI=1/4CO.Ni/c4*1-2;/rC4NiO4/c6-1-5(2-7,3-8)4-9 Key: AWDHUGLHGCVIEG-ARWXMKMZAJ
- SMILES: [O+]#C[Ni-4](C#[O+])(C#[O+])C#[O+]

Properties
Chemical formula	Ni(CO)_{4}
Molar mass	170.73 g/mol
Appearance	colorless liquid
Odor	musty, like brick dust
Density	1.319 g/cm^{3}
Melting point	−17.2 °C (1.0 °F; 256.0 K)
Boiling point	43 °C (109 °F; 316 K)
Solubility in water	0.018 g/100 mL (10 °C)
Solubility	miscible in most organic solvents soluble in nitric acid, aqua regia
Vapor pressure	315 mmHg (20 °C)
Viscosity	3.05 × 10^{−4} Pa s

Structure
Coordination geometry	Tetrahedral
Molecular shape	Tetrahedral
Dipole moment	zero

Thermochemistry
Std molar entropy (S^{⦵}_{298})	320 J K^{−1} mol^{−1}
Std enthalpy of formation (Δ_{f}H^{⦵}_{298})	−632 kJ/mol
Std enthalpy of combustion (Δ_{c}H^{⦵}_{298})	−1180 kJ/mol

Hazards
- Occupational safety and health (OHS/OSH)
Main hazards	Potential occupational carcinogen
- GHS labelling
Pictograms	
Hazard statements	H225, H300, H301, H304, H310, H330, H351, H360D, H410
Precautionary statements	P201, P202, P210, P233, P240, P241, P242, P243, P260, P271, P273, P280, P281, P284, P303+P361+P353, P304+P340, P308+P313, P310, P320, P370+P378, P391, P403+P233, P403+P235, P405, P501
NFPA 704 (fire diamond)	4 3 3
Flash point	4 °C (39 °F; 277 K)
Autoignition temperature	60 °C (140 °F; 333 K)
Explosive limits	2–34%
- Lethal dose or concentration (LD, LC)
LC_{50} (median concentration)	266 ppm (cat, 30 min); 35 ppm (rabbit, 30 min); 94 ppm (mouse, 30 min); 10 ppm (mouse, 10 min)
LC_{Lo} (lowest published)	360 ppm (dog, 90 min); 30 ppm (human, 30 min); 42 ppm (rabbit, 30 min); 7 ppm (mouse, 30 min)
- NIOSH (US health exposure limits)
PEL (Permissible)	TWA 0.001 ppm (0.007 mg/m^{3})
REL (Recommended)	TWA 0.001 ppm (0.007 mg/m^{3})
IDLH (Immediate danger)	Ca [2 ppm]
Safety data sheet (SDS)	ICSC 0064

Related compounds
Related metal carbonyls	Chromium hexacarbonyl; Molybdenum hexacarbonyl; Tungsten hexacarbonyl; Seaborgium hexacarbonyl; Vanadium hexacarbonyl; Dimanganese decacarbonyl; Dirhenium decacarbonyl; Iron pentacarbonyl; Diiron nonacarbonyl; Triruthenium dodecacarbonyl; Triosmium dodecacarbonyl; Dicobalt octacarbonyl; Tetrarhodium dodecacarbonyl; Tetrairidium dodecacarbonyl
- Except where otherwise noted, data are given for materials in their standard state (at 25 °C [77 °F], 100 kPa). verify (what is ?) Infobox references

Nickel carbonyl (IUPAC name: tetracarbonylnickel) is a nickel(0) organometallic compound with the formula Ni(CO)_{4}. This colorless liquid is the principal carbonyl of nickel. It is an intermediate in the Mond process for producing very high-purity nickel and a reagent in organometallic chemistry, although the Mond Process has fallen out of common usage due to the health hazards in working with the compound. Nickel carbonyl is one of the most dangerous substances yet encountered in nickel chemistry due to its very high toxicity, compounded with high volatility and rapid skin absorption.

== Structure and bonding ==
In nickel tetracarbonyl, the oxidation state for nickel is assigned as zero, because the Ni−C bonding electrons come from the C atom and are still assigned to C in the hypothetical ionic bond which determines the oxidation states. The formula conforms to the 18-electron rule. The molecule is tetrahedral, with four carbonyl (carbon monoxide) ligands. Electron diffraction studies have been performed on this molecule, and the Ni−C and C−O distances have been calculated to be 1.838(2) and 1.141(2) angstroms respectively.

== Preparation ==
Ni(CO)_{4} was first synthesised in 1890 by Ludwig Mond by the direct reaction of nickel metal with carbon monoxide. This pioneering work foreshadowed the existence of many other metal carbonyl compounds, including those of vanadium, chromium, manganese, iron, and cobalt. It was also applied industrially to the purification of nickel by the end of the 19th century.

At 323 K (50 °C; 122 °F), carbon monoxide is passed over impure nickel. The optimal rate occurs at 130 °C.

=== Laboratory routes ===
Ni(CO)_{4} is not readily available commercially. It is conveniently generated in the laboratory by carbonylation of commercially available bis(cyclooctadiene)nickel(0). It can also be prepared by reduction of ammoniacal solutions of nickel sulfate with sodium dithionite under an atmosphere of CO.

== Reactions ==
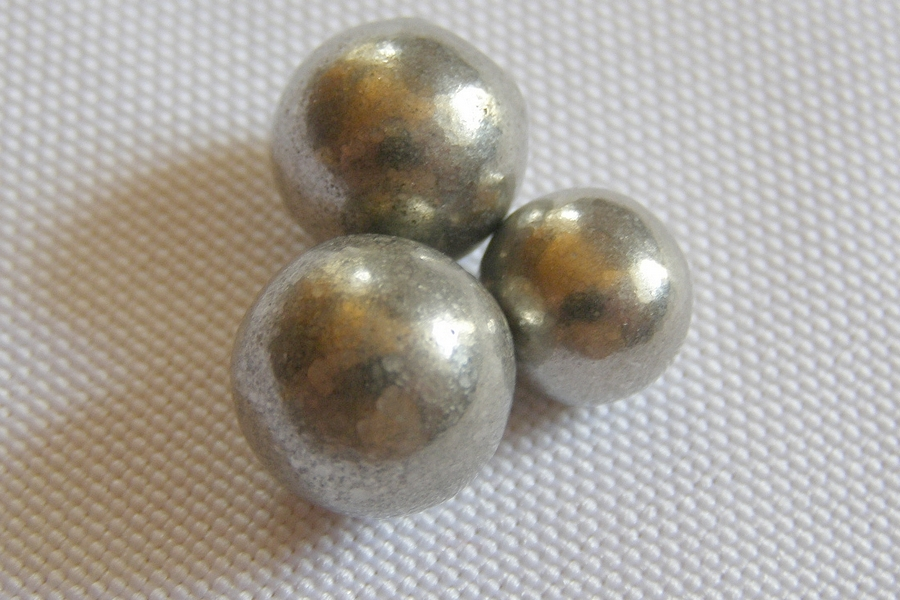
Spheres of nickel made by the Mond process

=== Thermal decarbonylation ===
On moderate heating, Ni(CO)_{4} decomposes to carbon monoxide and nickel metal. Combined with the easy formation from CO and even very impure nickel, this decomposition is the basis for the Mond process for the purification of nickel or plating onto surfaces. Thermal decomposition commences near 180 °C (356 °F) and increases at higher temperature.

=== Reactions with nucleophiles and reducing agents ===
Like other low-valent metal carbonyls, Ni(CO)_{4} is susceptible to be attacked by nucleophiles. Attack can occur at nickel center, resulting in displacement of CO ligands, or at CO. Thus, donor ligands such as triphenylphosphine react to give Ni(CO)_{3}(PPh_{3}) and Ni(CO)_{2}(PPh_{3})_{2}. Bipyridine and related ligands behave similarly. The monosubstitution of nickel tetracarbonyl with other ligands can be used to determine the Tolman electronic parameter, a measure of the electron donating or withdrawing ability of a given ligand.

Structure of Ni(PPh_{3})_{2}(CO)_{2}.

Treatment with hydroxides gives clusters such as [Ni_{5}(CO)_{12}]^{2−} and [Ni_{6}(CO)_{12}]^{2−}. These compounds can also be obtained by reduction of nickel carbonyl.

Thus, treatment of Ni(CO)_{4} with carbon nucleophiles (Nu^{−}) results in acyl derivatives such as [Ni(CO)_{3}C(O)Nu)]^{−}.

=== Reactions with electrophiles and oxidizing agents ===
Nickel carbonyl can be oxidized. Chlorine oxidizes nickel carbonyl into NiCl_{2}, releasing CO gas. Other halogens behave analogously. This reaction provides a convenient method for precipitating the nickel portion of the toxic compound.

Reactions of Ni(CO)_{4} with alkyl and aryl halides often result in carbonylated organic products. Vinylic halides, such as PhCH=CHBr, are converted to the unsaturated esters upon treatment with Ni(CO)_{4} followed by sodium methoxide. Such reactions also probably proceed via oxidative addition. Allylic halides give the π-allylnickel compounds, such as (allyl)_{2}Ni_{2}Cl_{2}: 2 Ni(CO)_{4} + 2 ClCH_{2}CH=CH_{2} → Ni_{2} (μ-Cl)_{2}(η^{3}-C_{3}H_{5})_{2} + 8 CO

== Toxicology and safety considerations ==
The hazards of Ni(CO)_{4} are far greater than that implied by its CO content, reflecting the effects of the nickel if released in the body. Nickel carbonyl may be fatal if absorbed through the skin or more likely, inhaled due to its high volatility. Its LC_{50} for a 30-minute exposure has been estimated at 3 ppm, and the concentration that is immediately fatal to humans would be 30 ppm. Some subjects exposed to puffs up to 5 ppm described the odour as musty or sooty, but because the compound is so exceedingly toxic, its smell provides no reliable warning against a potentially fatal exposure.

The vapours of Ni(CO)_{4} can autoignite. The vapor decomposes quickly in air, with a half-life of about 40 seconds.

Nickel carbonyl poisoning is characterized by a two-stage illness. The first consists of headaches and chest pain lasting a few hours, usually followed by a short remission. The second phase is a chemical pneumonitis which starts after typically 16 hours with symptoms of cough, breathlessness and extreme fatigue. These reach greatest severity after four days, possibly resulting in death from cardiorespiratory or acute kidney injury. Convalescence is often extremely protracted, often complicated by exhaustion, depression and dyspnea on exertion. Permanent respiratory damage is unusual. The carcinogenicity of Ni(CO)_{4} is a matter of debate, but is presumed to be significant.

It is classified as an extremely hazardous substance in the United States as defined in Section 302 of the U.S. Emergency Planning and Community Right-to-Know Act (42 U.S.C. 11002), and is subject to strict reporting requirements by facilities which produce, store, or use it in significant quantities.

== In popular culture ==
"Requiem for the Living" (1978), an episode of Quincy, M.E., features a poisoned, dying crime lord who asks Dr. Quincy to autopsy his still-living body. Quincy identifies the poison—nickel carbonyl.

In the 1979 novella Amanda Morgan by Gordon R. Dickson, the remaining inhabitants of a mostly evacuated village resist an occupying military force by directing the exhaust from a poorly-tuned internal combustion engine onto a continually renewed "waste heap" of powdered nickel outside a machine shop (under the guise of civilian business) in order to eliminate the occupiers, at the cost of their own lives.

In chapter 199 of the manga Dr. Stone, a machine is made that purifies nickel via the Mond Process. It is mentioned that the process creates a "fatal toxin" (nickel carbonyl).

In the 2019 novel Delta-v from New York Times bestselling author Daniel Suarez a team of eight private miners reach a near-earth asteroid to extract volatiles (water, CO_{2}, etc.) and metals (iron, nickel and cobalt); these are stored as solid carbonyl for transfer back to near Earth orbit, and used for in-situ fabrication of a spacecraft, via decomposition in vacuum.
