= Chromium hexacarbonyl =

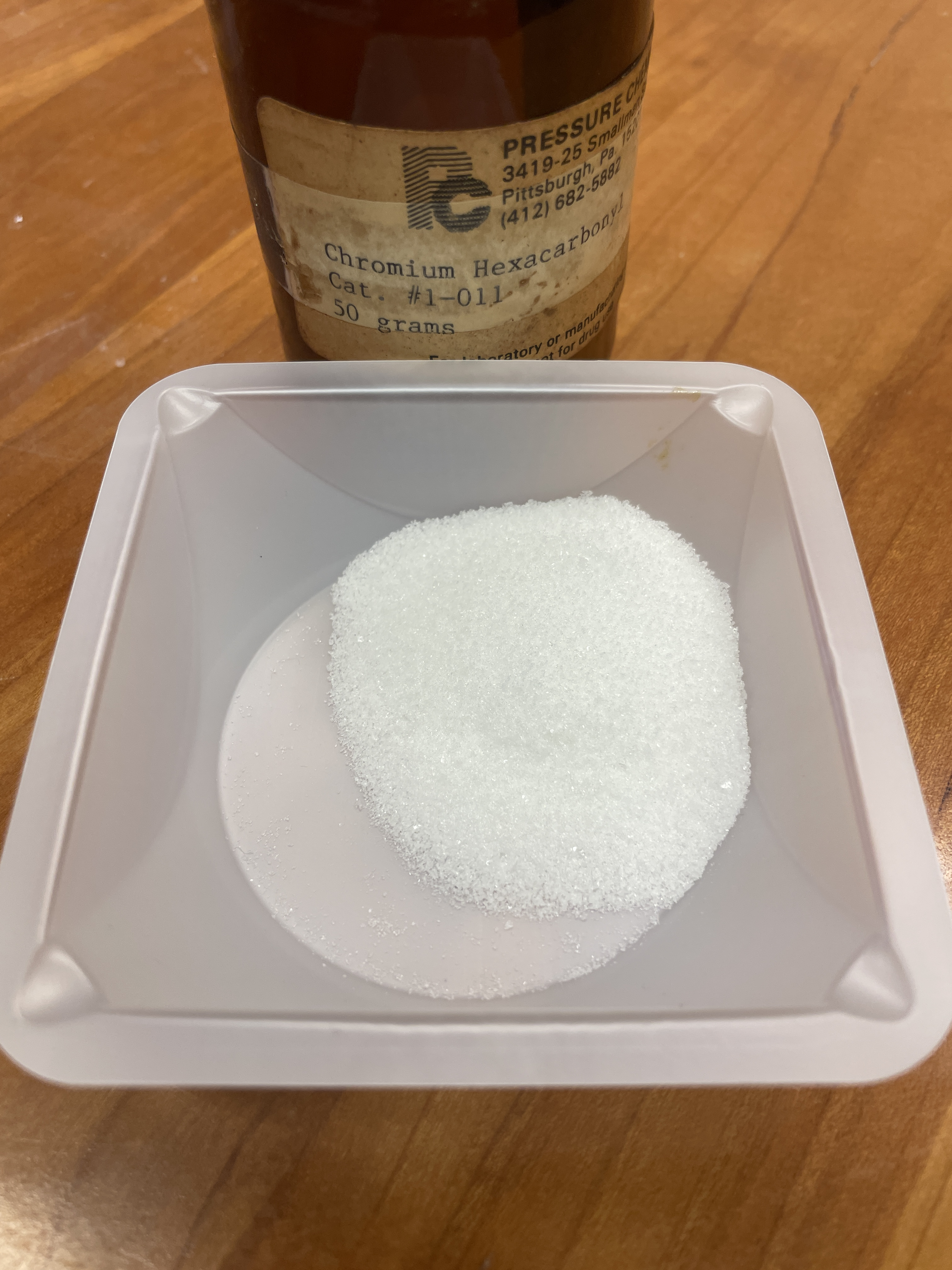

Names
- IUPAC name Hexacarbonylchromium
- Other names Chromium carbonyl

Identifiers
CAS Number	13007-92-6
3D model (JSmol)	Interactive image
ChEBI	CHEBI:33031
ChemSpider	23855
ECHA InfoCard	100.032.579
PubChem CID	518677
RTECS number	GB5075000
UNII	920F3EJX2P
CompTox Dashboard (EPA)	DTXSID6024830
- InChI: InChI=1S/6CO.Cr/c6*1-2; Key: KOTQLLUQLXWWDK-UHFFFAOYSA-N; InChI=1/6CO.Cr/c6*1-2; Key: KOTQLLUQLXWWDK-UHFFFAOYAN
- SMILES: O=C=[Cr](=C=O)(=C=O)(=C=O)(=C=O)=C=O

Properties
Chemical formula	Cr(CO)_{6}
Molar mass	220.057 g/mol
Appearance	colorless crystals
Density	1.77 g/cm^{3}, solid
Melting point	90 °C (194 °F; 363 K)
Boiling point	210 °C (410 °F; 483 K) (decomposes)
Solubility in water	insoluble
Solubility	soluble in organic solvents

Structure
Crystal structure	orthrhombic
Coordination geometry	octahedral
Dipole moment	0 D

Hazards
- Occupational safety and health (OHS/OSH)
Main hazards	Toxic
NFPA 704 (fire diamond)	2 1 0
Flash point	210 °C (410 °F; 483 K)
- Lethal dose or concentration (LD, LC)
LD_{50} (median dose)	150 mg/kg (oral, mouse); 230 mg/kg (oral, rat)
- NIOSH (US health exposure limits)
PEL (Permissible)	TWA 1 mg/m^{3}
REL (Recommended)	TWA 0.5 mg/m^{3}
IDLH (Immediate danger)	250 mg/m^{3}
Safety data sheet (SDS)	Oxford MSDS

Related compounds
Related compounds	Molybdenum hexacarbonyl; Tungsten hexacarbonyl; Seaborgium hexacarbonyl; Vanadium hexacarbonyl; Dimanganese decacarbonyl; Dirhenium decacarbonyl; Iron pentacarbonyl; Diiron nonacarbonyl; Triruthenium dodecacarbonyl; Triosmium dodecacarbonyl; Dicobalt octacarbonyl; Tetrarhodium dodecacarbonyl; Tetrairidium dodecacarbonyl; Nickel tetracarbonyl
- Except where otherwise noted, data are given for materials in their standard state (at 25 °C [77 °F], 100 kPa). verify (what is ?) Infobox references

Chromium hexacarbonyl (IUPAC name: hexacarbonylchromium) is a chromium(0) organometallic compound with the formula Cr(CO)_{6}. It is a homoleptic complex, which means that all the ligands are identical. It is a colorless crystalline air-stable solid, with a high vapor pressure.

== Preparation ==
Like many metal carbonyls, Cr(CO)_{6} is generally prepared by "reductive carbonylation", which involves reduction of a metal halide with under an atmosphere of carbon monoxide. As described in a 2023 survey of methods "most cost-effective routes for the synthesis of group 6 hexacarbonyls are based on the reduction of the metal chlorides (CrCl_{3}, MoCl_{5} or WCl_{6}) with magnesium, zinc or aluminium powders... under CO pressures".

$$\ce{CrCl3 ->[\text{CO}][\text{Reductant}] Cr(CO)6}$$

Early work on methods included contributions from luminaries such as Walter Hieber, his student Ernst Otto Fischer, and Giulio Natta. Using specially produced chromium metal will react with CO gas to give Cr(CO)_{6} directly, although the method is not used commercially.

== Electronic structure and bonding ==
In chromium hexacarbonyl, the oxidation state for chromium is assigned as zero, because Cr-C bonding electrons come from the C atom and are still assigned to C in the hypothetical ionic bond which determines the oxidation states. The formula conforms to the 18-electron rule and the complex adopts octahedral geometry with six carbonyl ligands.

The bonding between d^{6} chromium metal and neutral carbonyl ligands is described by the Dewar-Chatt-Duncanson model.It involves donation of electrons in HOMO of CO to empty d orbitals of the Cr metals while back-bonding from other d orbitals to the pi* orbital of the ligands reinforces the interactions synergistically.

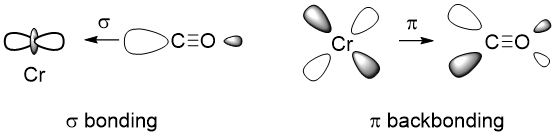
Orbital interactions in a chromium-CO complex. On the left, a filled sigma-orbital on CO overlaps with an empty d-orbital on the metal. On the right, an empty pi-antibonding orbital on CO overlaps with a filled d-orbital on the metal.

The crystallographic studies on this compound have discovered the Cr–C and C–O distances of 1.916 and 1.171 Å, respectively. On one hand, there has been continuous efforts to calculate the electronic structures (including HOMO and LUMO) as well as its molecular geometry on the chromium hexacarbonyl compound with various approaches. According to one of the most recent studies, the ground state configuration of Cr(CO)_{6} turns out (2t_{2g})^{6}(9 t_{1u})^{0}(2t_{2u})^{0}.

== Reactions and applications ==
=== Photochemical reactions ===
==== Pentacarbonyl derivatives ====
When heated or UV-irradiated in tetrahydrofuran (THF) solution, Cr(CO)_{6} converts to Cr(CO)_{5}(THF) with loss of one CO ligand. The THF ligand is readily displaced. Often the THF complex is generated and used in situ.

UV-irradiation of frozen solutions of chromium hexacarbonyl affords a variety of labile adducts, including labile but complexes with some noble gases.

==== Photodimerization of norbornadiene ====
Norbornadiene was dimerized photochemically in the presence of Cr(CO)_{6}, similarly to other metal complexes like Fe(CO)_{5}, Ni(CO)_{4}, and Co(CO)_{3}(NO).

=== Arene derivatives ===
Heating a solution of Cr(CO)_{6} in an aromatic solvent results in replacement of three CO ligands. The reactions are especially favorable for electron-rich arenes:

Cr(CO)_{6} + C_{6}H_{5}R → Cr(CO)_{3}(C_{6}H_{5}R) + 3 CO

The products are "piano stool complexes". These species are typically yellow solids. One example is (benzene)chromium tricarbonyl.

=== Fischer carbenes ===
Alkyl and aryl organolithium reagents (RLi) add to Cr(CO)_{6} to give anionic acyl complexes. These anionic species in turn react with alkylating agents such as trimethyloxonium tetrafluoroborate [(CH_{3})_{3}O]^{+}[BF_{4}]^{−} to form (R−)(CH_{3}O−)C=Cr(CO)_{5}, where R stands for alkyl, to give Fischer carbene complexes:

=== Cyclopentadienyl derivatives ===
Treatment of chromium hexacarbonyl with sodium cyclopentadienide gives Na^{+}[Cr(CO)_{3}(C_{5}H_{5})]^{−}. Oxidation of this salt affords cyclopentadienylchromium tricarbonyl dimer ((C_{5}H_{5})_{2}Cr_{2}(CO)_{6}). This complex is distinctive because it exists in measurable equilibrium with the monometallic Cr(I) radical •Cr(CO)_{3}(C_{5}H_{5}).

=== Ligand-transfer reactions ===
A unique double ligand-transfer reaction was reported with using chromium trichloride and chromium hexacarbonyl. In reactions, potassium perrhenate (KReO_{4}) is reduced and carbonylated by the chromium reagents and undergoes [C_{5}H_{5}]^{−} ligand-transfer to afford Re(CO)_{3}(C_{5}H_{5}) complex derivatives.

=== Reduction ===
Chromium hexacarbonyl reacts with sodium electride in ammonia to give sodium pentacarbonylchromate(-II) and sodium acetylenediolate.

== Safety ==
In common with many of the other homoleptic metal carbonyls (e.g. nickel carbonyl and iron carbonyl), chromium hexacarbonyl is toxic and thought to be carcinogenic. Its vapor pressure is relatively high for a metal complex, 1 mmHg (130 Pa) at 36 °C.

== Historic literature ==
- Job, André (1927). Le chrome carbonyle et sa préparation par les organomagnésiens. impr. P. Dupont. OCLC 494793545.
- Hieber, W.; Mühlbauer, F. (1935-01-28). "Über Metallcarbonyle. XII. Reaktionen und Derivate der Hexacarbonyle des Chroms und Molybdäns". Zeitschrift für anorganische und allgemeine Chemie. 221 (4): 337–348. doi:10.1002/zaac.19352210404.
- Owen, Benton B.; English, James; Cassidy, Harold G.; Dundon, Clarissa Vanderbilt (July 1947). "The Synthesis of Chromium Hexacarbonyl 1,2". Journal of the American Chemical Society. 69 (7): 1723–1725. Bibcode:1947JAChS..69.1723O. doi:10.1021/ja01199a044. ISSN 0002-7863.
- Natta, G.; Ercoli, R.; Calderazzo, F.; Rabizzoni, A. (July 1957). "A New Synthesis of the Chromium Hexacarbonyl". Journal of the American Chemical Society. 79 (13): 3611–3612. Bibcode:1957JAChS..79.3611N. doi:10.1021/ja01570a092. ISSN 0002-7863.
- Rieke, Reuben D.; Öfele, Karl; Fischer, E. O. (1974-08-13). "Activated metals: VIII. Preparation of chromium hexacarbonyl from chromium metal". Journal of Organometallic Chemistry. 76 (1): C19–C21. doi:10.1016/S0022-328X(00)90328-0. ISSN 0022-328X.
