= Iron tetracarbonyl diiodide =

Identifiers
CAS Number	14911-55-8
3D model (JSmol)	Interactive image
ChemSpider	452752
PubChem CID	519026
- InChI: InChI=1S/4CO.Fe.2HI/c4*1-2;;;/h;;;;;2*1H/q;;;;+2;;/p-2 Key: BNIJVXICMSDYLX-UHFFFAOYSA-L
- SMILES: [C-]#[O+].[C-]#[O+].[C-]#[O+].[C-]#[O+].[Fe](I)I

Properties
Chemical formula	C_{4}FeI_{2}O_{4}
Molar mass	421.694 g·mol^{−1}
Appearance	black solid
- Except where otherwise noted, data are given for materials in their standard state (at 25 °C [77 °F], 100 kPa). Infobox references

Iron tetracarbonyl diiodide is the inorganic compound with the formula FeI_{2}(CO)_{4}. The molecule features four carbonyl ligands and two iodides. It is a low-spin complex of ferrous iron. As confirmed by X-ray crystallography, the compound has cis stereochemistry. It is a black solid that is soluble in dichloromethane and related organic solvents.

== Preparation and reactions ==
It is prepared by the reaction of molecular iodine with iron pentacarbonyl, following a procedure first reported by Hieber and Wirschung in 1940:

Fe(CO)_{5} + I_{2} → FeI_{2}(CO)_{4} + CO

Iron tetracarbonyl diiodide reacts with a variety of Lewis bases with displacement of one or two CO ligands. The corresponding dibromide is even more reactive toward Lewis bases.
