= Carbonyl iron =

Type of iron

Carbonyl iron is a highly pure (97.5% for grade S, >99.5% for grade R) iron, prepared by chemical decomposition of purified iron pentacarbonyl. It usually has the appearance of grey powder, composed of spherical microparticles. Most of the impurities are carbon, oxygen, and nitrogen.

== History ==
BASF invented carbonyl iron powder in 1925 and claims to be the world's leading producer. In 1934, BASF was also involved in the development of the very first magnetic tapes used by the AEG Magnetophon tape recorder. Carbonyl iron became the first magnetic recording oxide (although quickly replaced in 1936 by iron oxide).

== Applications ==
In electronics, carbonyl iron is used to manufacture magnetic cores for high-frequency coils and in production of some ferrites. Spherical particles manufactured of carbonyl iron are used as a component of the radar absorbing materials used by the military, in stealth vehicles, for example. Carbonyl iron powder was used in Germany during World War II in the manufacture of radio frequency equipment, including radio transmitters and receivers, low hysteresis induction coils, filter and choke coils: higher grades were found to be especially suitable for carrier wave frequencies over 100 MHz.

Powdered cores made of carbonyl iron have high stability of parameters across a wide range of temperatures and magnetic flux levels, with excellent Q factors between 50 kHz and 200 MHz. A popular application is in broadband inductors, especially in high-power applications. Due to its high permeability and low core losses, Carbonyl iron powder cores are utilized in high-frequency switching circuit output chokes and resonant inductors. It can efficiently handle alternating current (AC) signals at high frequencies, improving performance in power supplies, RF applications, and telecommunications. Their fine particle size also helps reduce eddy current losses, enhancing overall efficiency.

Carbonyl iron powder has been used for human ingestion, similarly to other food-grade iron powders like direct reduced iron. One iron supplement from India uses this kind of powder to treat iron deficiency.

In 2017 carbonyl iron powder was reported as an effective reductant for aromatic nitro groups in water, an important reaction used in the synthesis of pharmaceuticals.

Particles of carbonyl iron (20–40%) suspended in a carrier fluid (60–80%) are used as a magnetorheological fluid.

Other uses are in powder metallurgy, metal injection molding, and in various specialty products. Nazi German scientists also found it to have anti-knock properties similar to lead tetraethyl.

== See also ==
- Carbonyl nickel, a pure nickel prepared by decomposition of nickel carbonyl
