= Homoleptic and heteroleptic compounds =

Metal chemical compound with all ligands identical

In inorganic chemistry, a homoleptic chemical compound is a metal compound with all ligands identical. The term uses the "homo-" prefix to indicate that something is the same for all. Any metal species which has more than one type of ligand is heteroleptic.

Some compounds with names that suggest that they are homoleptic are in fact heteroleptic, because they have ligands in them which are not featured in the name. For instance dialkyl magnesium complexes, which are found in the equilibrium which exists in a solution of a Grignard reagent in an ether, have two ether ligands attached to each magnesium centre. Another example is a solution of trimethyl aluminium in an ether solvent (such as THF); similar chemistry should be expected for a triaryl or trialkyl borane.

It is possible for some ligands such as DMSO to bind with two or more different coordination modes. It would still be reasonable to consider a complex which has only one type of ligand but with different coordination modes to be homoleptic. For example, the complex dichlorotetrakis(dimethyl sulfoxide)ruthenium(II) features DMSO coordinating via both sulfur and oxygen atoms (though this is not homoleptic since there are also chloride ligands).

== Homoleptic examples ==
- Chromium carbonyl
- Ferrocyanide
- Iron pentacarbonyl
- Nickel carbonyl
- Tetrakis(triphenylphosphine)palladium(0)
- Ferrocene
- Uranium hexafluoride
- tetraethyl lead
- tetramethyl lead
- tetrabutyl tin
- trimethylaluminium
- dimethylmercury
- Diethylzinc
- triethylborane
- Chromate
- Permanganate
- Ferroin
- bis(terpyridine)iron(II)
