= 18-electron rule =

Chemical property of transition metals

The 18-electron rule is a chemical rule of thumb used primarily for predicting and rationalizing formulas for stable transition metal complexes, especially organometallic compounds. The rule is based on the fact that the valence orbitals in the electron configuration of transition metals consist of five (n−1)d orbitals, one ns orbital, and three np orbitals, where n is the principal quantum number. These orbitals can collectively accommodate 18 electrons as either bonding or non-bonding electron pairs. This means that the combination of these nine atomic orbitals with ligand orbitals creates nine molecular orbitals that are either metal-ligand bonding or non-bonding. When a metal complex has 18 valence electrons, it is said to have achieved the same electron configuration as the noble gas in the period, lending stability to the complex. Transition metal complexes that deviate from the rule are often interesting or useful because they tend to be more reactive. The rule is not helpful for complexes of metals that are not transition metals. The rule was first proposed by American chemist Irving Langmuir in 1921.

== Applicability ==
The rule usefully predicts the formulas for low-spin complexes of the Cr, Mn, Fe, and Co triads. Well-known examples include ferrocene, iron pentacarbonyl, chromium carbonyl, and nickel carbonyl.

Ligands in a complex determine the applicability of the 18-electron rule. In general, complexes that obey the rule are composed at least partly of π-acceptor ligands (also known as π-acids). This kind of ligand exerts a very strong ligand field, which lowers the energies of the resultant molecular orbitals so that they are favorably occupied. Typical ligands include olefins, phosphines, and CO. Complexes of π-acids typically feature metal in a low-oxidation state. The relationship between oxidation state and the nature of the ligands is rationalized within the framework of π backbonding.

=== Consequences for reactivity ===
Compounds that obey the 18-electron rule are typically "exchange inert". Examples include [Co(NH_{3})_{6}]Cl_{3}, Mo(CO)_{6}, and [Fe(CN)_{6}]^{4−}. In such cases, in general ligand exchange occurs via dissociative substitution mechanisms, wherein the rate of reaction is determined by the rate of dissociation of a ligand. On the other hand, 18-electron compounds can be highly reactive toward electrophiles such as protons, and such reactions are associative in mechanism, being acid-base reactions.

Complexes with fewer than 18 valence electrons tend to show enhanced reactivity. Thus, the 18-electron rule is often a recipe for non-reactivity in either a stoichiometric or a catalytic sense.

=== Duodectet rule ===
Computational findings suggest valence p-orbitals on the metal participate in metal-ligand bonding, albeit weakly. However, Weinhold and Landis within the context of natural bond orbitals do not count the metal p-orbitals in metal-ligand bonding, although these orbitals are still included as polarization functions. This results in a duodectet (12-electron) rule for five d-orbitals and one s-orbital only.

The current consensus in the general chemistry community is that unlike the singular octet rule for main group elements, transition metals do not strictly obey either the 12-electron or 18-electron rule, but that the rules describe the lower bound and upper bound of valence electron count respectively. Thus, while transition metal d-orbital and s-orbital bonding readily occur, the involvement of the higher energy and more spatially diffuse p-orbitals in bonding depends on the central atom and coordination environment.

== Exceptions ==
π-donor or σ-donor ligands with small interactions with the metal orbitals lead to a weak ligand field which increases the energies of t_{2g} orbitals. These molecular orbitals become non-bonding or weakly anti-bonding orbitals (small Δ_{oct}). Therefore, addition or removal of electron has little effect on complex stability. In this case, there is no restriction on the number of d-electrons and complexes with 12–22 electrons are possible. Small Δ_{oct} makes filling e_{g}* possible (>18 e^{−}) and π-donor ligands can make t_{2g} antibonding (<18 e^{−}). These types of ligand are located in the low-to-medium part of the spectrochemical series. For example: [TiF_{6}]^{2−} (Ti(IV), d^{0}, 12 e^{−}), [Co(NH_{3})_{6}]^{3+} (Co(III), d^{6}, 18 e^{−}), [Cu(OH_{2})_{6}]^{2+} (Cu(II), d^{9}, 21 e^{−}).

In terms of metal ions, Δ_{oct} increases down a group as well as with increasing oxidation number. Strong ligand fields lead to low-spin complexes which cause some exceptions to the 18-electron rule.

=== 16-electron complexes ===
An important class of complexes that violate the 18e rule are the 16-electron complexes with metal d^{8} configurations. All high-spin d^{8} metal ions are octahedral (or tetrahedral), but the low-spin d^{8} metal ions are all square planar. Important examples of square-planar low-spin d^{8} metal Ions are Rh(I), Ir(I), Ni(II), Pd(II), and Pt(II). At picture below is shown the splitting of the d subshell in low-spin square-planar complexes. Examples are especially prevalent for derivatives of the cobalt and nickel triads. Such compounds are typically square-planar. The most famous example is Vaska's complex (IrCl(CO)(PPh_{3})_{2}), [PtCl_{4}]^{2−}, and Zeise's salt [PtCl_{3}(η^{2}-C_{2}H_{4})]^{−}. In such complexes, the d_{z^{2}} orbital is doubly occupied and nonbonding.

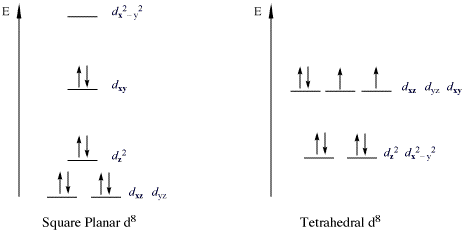

Many catalytic cycles operate via complexes that alternate between 18-electron and square-planar 16-electron configurations. Examples include Monsanto acetic acid synthesis, hydrogenations, hydroformylations, olefin isomerizations, and some alkene polymerizations.

Other violations can be classified according to the kinds of ligands on the metal center.

=== Bulky ligands ===
Bulky ligands can preclude the approach of the full complement of ligands that would allow the metal to achieve the 18 electron configuration. Examples:

- Ti(neopentyl)_{4} (8 e^{−})
- Cp*_{2}Ti(C_{2}H_{4}) (16 e^{−})
- V(CO)_{6} (17 e^{−})
- Cp*Cr(CO)_{3} (17 e^{−})
- Pt(P^{t}Bu_{3})_{2} (14 e^{−})
- Co(norbornyl)_{4} (13 e^{−})
- [FeCp_{2}]^{+} (17 e^{−})

Sometimes such complexes engage in agostic interactions with the hydrocarbon framework of the bulky ligand. For example:

- W(CO)_{3}[P(C_{6}H_{11})_{3}]_{2} has 16 e^{−} but has a short bonding contact between one C–H bond and the W center.
- Cp(PMe_{3})V(CHCMe_{3}) (14 e^{−}, diamagnetic) has a short V–H bond with the 'alkylidene-H', so the description of the compound is somewhere between Cp(PMe_{3})V(CHCMe_{3}) and Cp(PMe_{3})V(H)(CCMe_{3}).

=== High-spin complexes ===
High-spin metal complexes have singly occupied orbitals and may not have any empty orbitals into which ligands could donate electron density. In general, there are few or no π-acidic ligands in the complex. These singly occupied orbitals can combine with the singly occupied orbitals of radical ligands (e.g., oxygen), or addition of a strong field ligand can cause electron-pairing, thus creating a vacant orbital that it can donate into. Examples:

- CrCl_{3}(THF)_{3} (15 e^{−})
- [Mn(H_{2}O)_{6}]^{2+} (17 e^{−})
- [Cu(H_{2}O)_{6}]^{2+} (21 e^{−}, see comments below)

Complexes containing strongly π-donating ligands often violate the 18-electron rule. These ligands include fluoride (F^{−}), oxide (O^{2−}), nitride (N^{3−}), alkoxides (RO^{−}), and imides (RN^{2−}). Examples:

- [CrO_{4}]^{2−} (16 e^{−})
- Mo(=NR)_{2}Cl_{2} (12 e^{−})

In the latter case, there is substantial donation of the nitrogen lone pairs to the Mo (so the compound could also be described as a 16 e^{−} compound). This can be seen from the short Mo–N bond length, and from the angle Mo–N–C(R), which is nearly 180°. Counter-examples:

- trans-WO_{2}(Me_{2}PCH_{2}CH_{2}PMe_{2})_{2} (18 e^{−})
- Cp*ReO_{3} (18 e^{−})

In these cases, the M=O bonds are "pure" double bonds (i.e., no donation of the lone pairs of the oxygen to the metal), as reflected in the relatively long bond distances.

=== π-donating ligands ===
Ligands where the coordinating atoms bearing nonbonding lone pairs often stabilize unsaturated complexes. Metal amides and alkoxides often violate the 18e rule.

=== Combinations of effects ===
The above factors can sometimes combine. Examples include

- Cp*VOCl_{2} (14 e^{−})
- TiCl_{4} (8 e^{−})

=== Higher electron counts ===
Some complexes have more than 18 electrons. Examples:

- Cobaltocene (19 e^{−})
- Nickelocene (20 e^{−})
- The hexaaquacopper(II) ion [Cu(H_{2}O)_{6}]^{2+} (21 e^{−})
- TM(CO)_{8}^{−} (TM = Sc, Y) (20 e^{−})

Often, cases where complexes have more than 18 valence electrons are attributed to electrostatic forces – the metal attracts ligands to itself to try to counterbalance its positive charge, and the number of electrons it ends up with is unimportant. In the case of the metallocenes, the chelating nature of the cyclopentadienyl ligand stabilizes its bonding to the metal. Somewhat satisfying are the two following observations: cobaltocene is a strong electron donor, readily forming the 18-electron cobaltocenium cation; and nickelocene tends to react with substrates to give 18-electron complexes, e.g. CpNiCl(PR_{3}) and free CpH.

In the case of nickelocene, the extra two electrons are in orbitals which are weakly metal-carbon antibonding; this is why it often participates in reactions where the M–C bonds are broken and the electron count of the metal changes to 18.

The 20-electron systems TM(CO)_{8}^{−} (TM = Sc, Y) have a cubic (O_{h}) equilibrium geometry and a singlet (^{1}A_{1g}) electronic ground state. There is one occupied valence MO with a_{2u} symmetry, which is formed only by ligand orbitals without a contribution from the metal AOs. But the adducts TM(CO)_{8}^{−} (TM=Sc, Y) fulfill the 18-electron rule when one considers only those valence electrons, which occupy metal–ligand bonding orbitals.

== See also ==
- Electron counting – Formalism used for classifying compounds
- Ligand field theory – Molecular orbital theory applied to transition metal complexes
- d electron count – Description of the electron configuration
- Tolman's rule – Rule describing chemical reactions
