= Cerium(III) carbonate =

Names
- IUPAC names Cerium(III) carbonate Cerium tricarbonate
- Other names Cerous carbonate Dicerium tricarbonate

Identifiers
CAS Number	537-01-9
3D model (JSmol)	Interactive image
ChemSpider	141051
ECHA InfoCard	100.007.870
EC Number	208-655-6
PubChem CID	160516
UNII	CTT48UBF1V
CompTox Dashboard (EPA)	DTXSID7041758
- InChI: InChI=1S/3CH2O3.2Ce/c3*2-1(3)4;;/h3*(H2,2,3,4);;/q;;;2*+3/p-6 Key: GHLITDDQOMIBFS-UHFFFAOYSA-H
- SMILES: C(=O)([O-])[O-].C(=O)([O-])[O-].C(=O)([O-])[O-].[Ce+3].[Ce+3]

Properties
Chemical formula	Ce_{2}(CO_{3})_{3}
Molar mass	460.26 g/mol
Appearance	White solid
Melting point	500 °C (932 °F; 773 K)
Solubility in water	Negligible

Hazards
- GHS labelling
Hazard statements	H413
Precautionary statements	P273, P501
Flash point	Non-flammable
- Except where otherwise noted, data are given for materials in their standard state (at 25 °C [77 °F], 100 kPa). Infobox references

Cerium(III) carbonate Ce_{2}(CO_{3})_{3}, is the salt formed by cerium(III) cations and carbonate anions. Its pure form was not yet confirmed to exist in the nature, but Ce-bearing carbonates (mainly bastnäsite group) stand for an ore of cerium metal, along with monazite.

== Properties ==
The molecular weight of the compound of cerium(III) carbonate is 460.26 g/mole.

== Synonyms ==
Cerium(III) carbonate is also known as cerium tricarbonate, dicerium tricarbonate, cerium carbonate, cerous carbonate, and dicerium(3+) ion tricarbonate.

== Uses ==
Cerium(III) carbonate is used in the production of cerium(III) chloride, and in incandescent lamps.
