= Diiron nonacarbonyl =

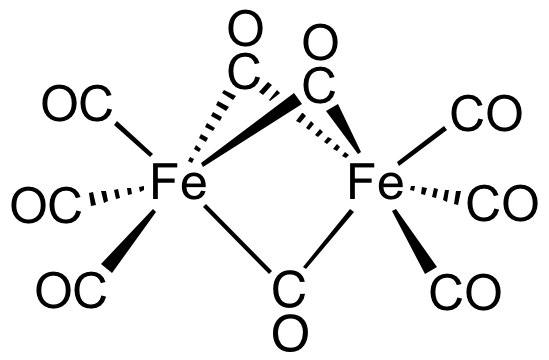
Diiron nonacarbonyl
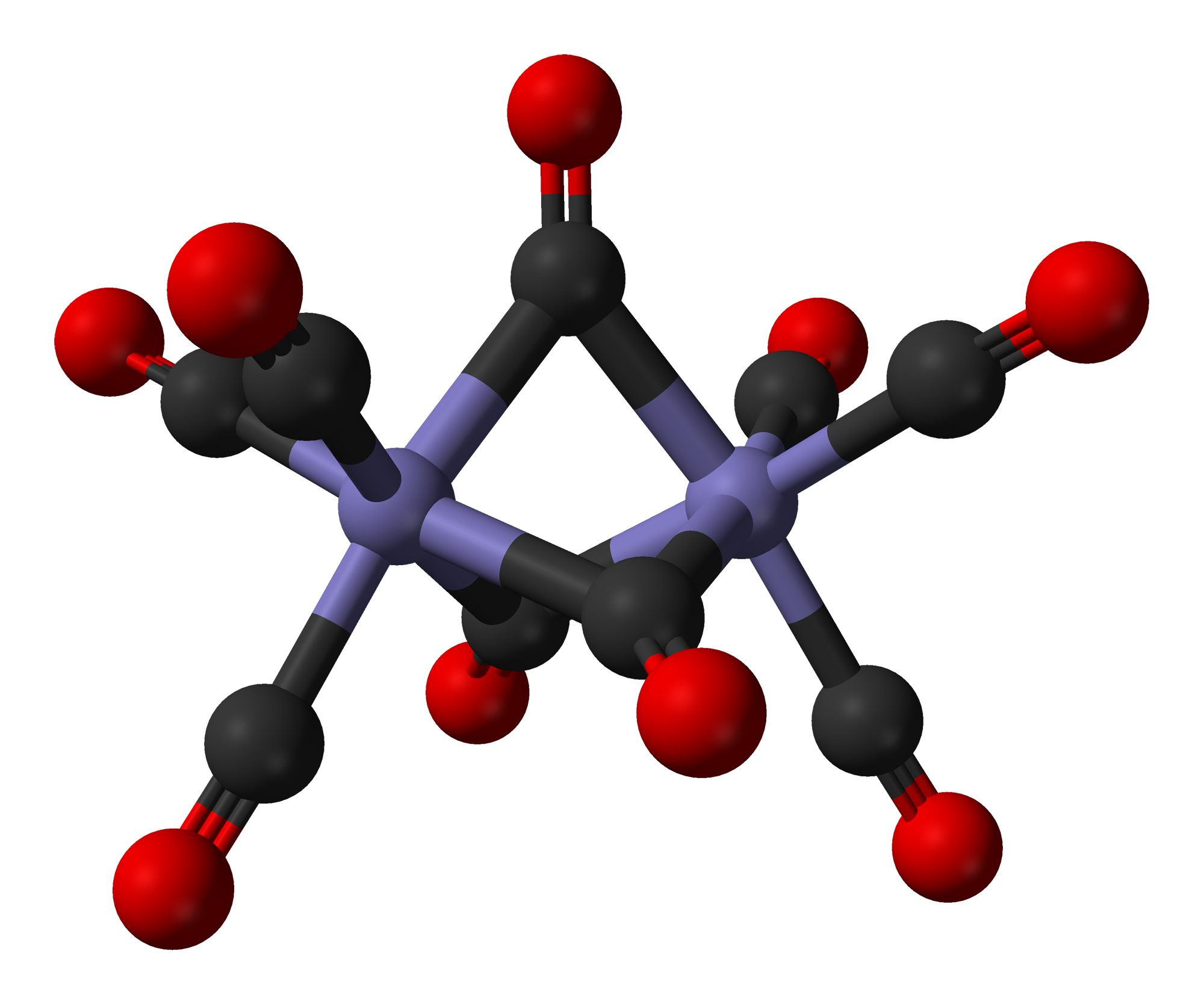
Diiron nonacarbonyl
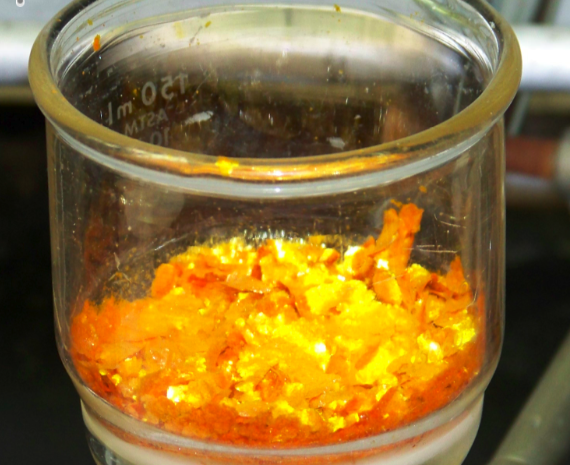
- Sample of diiron nonacarbonyl

Names
- IUPAC name Diiron nonacarbonyl, tri-μ-carbonyl-bis(tricarbonyliron)(Fe—Fe)
- Other names Iron enneacarbonyl

Identifiers
CAS Number	15321-51-4
3D model (JSmol)	Interactive image
ChemSpider	4807522
ECHA InfoCard	100.035.765
EC Number	239-359-5
PubChem CID	6096993
CompTox Dashboard (EPA)	DTXSID50934700
- InChI: InChI=1S/9CO.2Fe/c9*1-2;; Key: JCXLZXJCZPKTBW-UHFFFAOYSA-N; InChI=1/9CO.2Fe/c9*1-2;; Key: JCXLZXJCZPKTBW-UHFFFAOYAN
- SMILES: O=C1[Fe]2(=C=O)(=C=O)(=C=O)C(=O)[Fe]1(=C=O)(=C=O)(=C=O)C2=O

Properties
Chemical formula	Fe_{2}C_{9}O_{9}
Molar mass	363.78 g/mol
Appearance	orange crystals
Density	2.08 g/cm^{3}
Melting point	decomposes at 100 °C
Solubility in water	insoluble

Structure
Dipole moment	0 D

Hazards
- Occupational safety and health (OHS/OSH)
Main hazards	Toxic, flammable
- GHS labelling
Pictograms	(GHS02: Flammable) (GHS09: Environmental hazard) (GHS06: Toxic)
Signal word	Danger

Related compounds
Related iron carbonyls	Iron pentacarbonyl Triiron dodecacarbonyl
Related compounds	Dimanganese decacarbonyl Dicobalt octacarbonyl
- Except where otherwise noted, data are given for materials in their standard state (at 25 °C [77 °F], 100 kPa). verify (what is ?) Infobox references

Diiron nonacarbonyl is an organometallic compound with the formula Fe_{2}(CO)_{9}. This metal carbonyl is a reagent in organometallic chemistry and of occasional use in organic synthesis. It is a more reactive source of Fe(0) than Fe(CO)_{5}. This micaceous orange solid is virtually insoluble in all common solvents.

== Synthesis and structure ==
Following the original method, photolysis of an acetic acid solution of Fe(CO)_{5} produces Fe_{2}(CO)_{9} in good yield:

2 Fe(CO)_{5} → Fe_{2}(CO)_{9} + CO

Fe_{2}(CO)_{9} consists of a pair of Fe(CO)_{3} centers linked by three bridging CO ligands. Although older textbooks show an Fe-Fe bond consistent with the 18 electron rule (8 valence electrons from Fe, two each from the terminal carbonyls, one each from the bridging carbonyls and one from the other Fe atom in the metal-metal bond), theoretical analyses have consistently indicated the absence of a direct Fe-Fe bond: this latter model proposes an Fe-C-Fe three-center-two-electron "banana bond" for one of the bridging carbonyls. The minor isomer has been crystallized together with C_{60}. The iron atoms are equivalent and octahedral molecular geometry. Elucidation of the structure of Fe_{2}(CO)_{9} proved to be challenging because its low solubility inhibits growth of crystals. The Mößbauer spectrum reveals one quadrupole doublet, consistent with the D_{3h}-symmetric structure.

== Reactions ==
Fe_{2}(CO)_{9} is a precursor to compounds of the type Fe(CO)_{4}L and Fe(CO)_{3}(diene). Such syntheses are typically conducted as tetrahydrofuran (THF) slurries. In these conversions, it is proposed that small amounts of Fe_{2}(CO)_{9} dissolve according to the following reaction:

Fe_{2}(CO)_{9} ⇌ Fe(CO)_{5} + Fe(CO)_{4}(THF)

Alkene complexes arise by direct reaction of a suspension in warm benzene:

Fe_{2}(CO)_{9} + RCH=CRH → Fe(CO)_{5} + Fe(CO)_{4}(RCH=CRH)

In related reaction (benzylideneacetone)iron tricarbonyl, with the formula (C_{6}H_{5}CH=CHC(O)CH_{3})Fe(CO)_{3} is prepared by the reaction of diiron nonacarbonyl with benzylideneacetone. This complex is a source of the Fe(CO)_{3} fragment. Oxidative addition of allyl bromide to diiron nonacarbonyl gives the allyl iron(II) derivative:

Fe_{2}(CO)_{9} + BrCH_{2}CH=CH_{2} → FeBr(CO)_{3}(C_{3}H_{5}) + CO + Fe(CO)_{5}

Cyclobutadieneiron tricarbonyl is prepared similarly using 3,4-dichlorocyclobutene, as described in the following idealized equation:

C_{4}H_{4}Cl_{2} + Fe_{2}(CO)_{9} → (C_{4}H_{4})Fe(CO)_{3} + FeCl_{2} + 6 CO

Fe_{2}(CO)_{9} has also been employed in the synthesis of cyclopentadienones via a net [2+3]-cycloaddition from dibromoketones, known as the Noyori [3+2] reaction.

Low temperature (15 K) UV/vis photolysis of Fe_{2}(CO)_{9} yields the unsaturated complex Fe_{2}(CO)_{8}, which exists as both CO-bridged and unbridged isomers.

== Safety ==
Metal carbonyls are typically treated as if they are highly toxic.
