= Mond process =

Process to extract and purify nickel

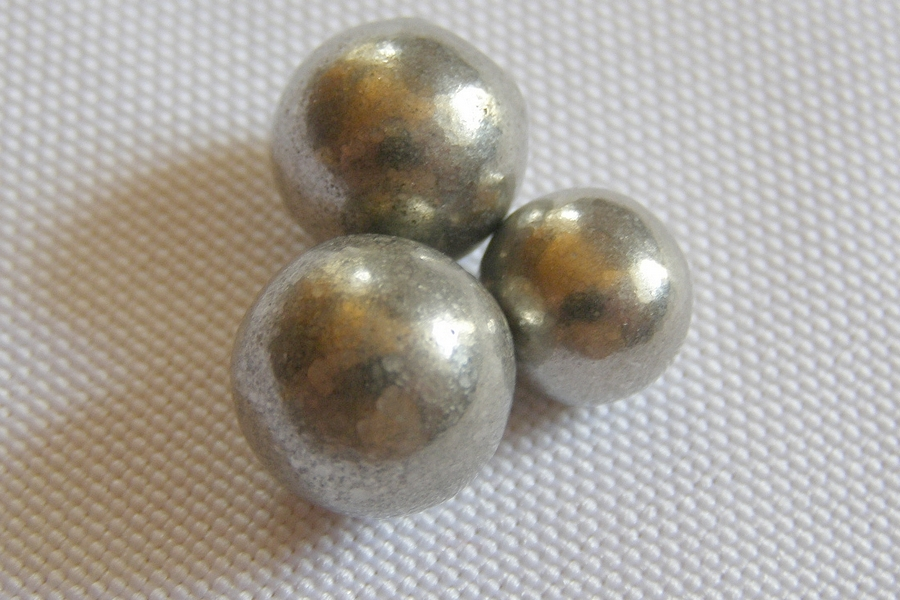
Spheres of nickel made by the Mond process

The Mond process, sometimes known as the carbonyl process, is a technique created by Ludwig Mond in 1890, to extract and purify nickel. The process was used commercially before the end of the 19th century, and particularly by the International Nickel Company in the Sudbury Basin. This process converts nickel oxides into nickel metal with very high purity being attainable in just a single step.

== Synopsis ==
This process involves the fact that carbon monoxide combines with nickel readily and reversibly to give nickel carbonyl. Few other elements other than nickel, iron, and cobalt form carbonyl compounds under the mild conditions used in the process.

This process has three steps:

1. Metal Feed (consisting of primarily Nickel oxide) reacts with hydrogen at 200 °C to give nickel. Other impurities including iron and cobalt are also reduced.

NiO(s) + H_{2}(g) → Ni(s) + H_{2}O(g)

2. The impure nickel reacts with carbon monoxide at 50–60 °C to form the gas nickel carbonyl, leaving the impurities as solids.

Ni(s) + 4 CO(g) → Ni(CO)_{4}(g)

3. The mixture of nickel carbonyl and carbon monoxide is heated to 220–250 °C, resulting in decomposition back to nickel and carbon monoxide:

Ni(CO)_{4}(g) → Ni(s) + 4 CO(g)

Steps 2 and 3 illustrate a chemical transport reaction, exploiting the properties that (1) carbon monoxide and nickel readily combine to give a volatile complex and (2) this complex degrades back to nickel and carbon monoxide at higher temperatures. The decomposition may be engineered to produce powder, but more commonly an existing substrate is coated with nickel. For example, nickel pellets are made by dropping small, hot pellets through the carbonyl gas; this deposits a layer of nickel onto the pellets.

This process has also been used for plating nickel onto other metals, where a complex shape or sharp corners have made precise results difficult to achieve by electroplating. Although the results are good, the toxicity makes it impractical as an industrial process. Such parts are now plated by electroless nickel plating instead.

== See also ==
- Carbonyl metallurgy
- Crystal bar process
