= Seaborgium hexacarbonyl =

Names
- IUPAC name Hexacarbonylseaborgium
- Other names Seaborgium carbonyl

Identifiers
3D model (JSmol)	Interactive image
- InChI: InChI=1S/6CO.Sg/c6*1-2; Key: GMBKQKYFDUHVHF-UHFFFAOYSA-N
- SMILES: O=C=[Sg](=C=O)(=C=O)(=C=O)(=C=O)=C=O

Properties
Chemical formula	Sg(CO)_{6}
Molar mass	437 g·mol^{−1}

Hazards
- Occupational safety and health (OHS/OSH)
Main hazards	Radioactive

Related compounds
Other cations	Chromium hexacarbonyl Molybdenum hexacarbonyl Tungsten hexacarbonyl
- Except where otherwise noted, data are given for materials in their standard state (at 25 °C [77 °F], 100 kPa). verify (what is ?) Infobox references

Seaborgium hexacarbonyl (also called seaborgium carbonyl) is the organometallic compound (a metal carbonyl) with the formula Sg(CO)_{6}. As of 2026, it is the only known organo(transactinide) compound, making seaborgium the heaviest element (in terms of atomic number) known to form a bond with carbon. Like its chromium, molybdenum, and tungsten analogs, it is a volatile derivative of seaborgium in its zero oxidation state. Seaborgium hexacarbonyl has little practical usage, outside of scientific interest, where it and other transactinide compounds are studied to shed light on relativistic effects on electronic structure as a consequence of high nuclear charge.

== Synthesis ==
Sg(CO)_{6} can be prepared by passing seaborgium atoms through a helium and carbon monoxide mixture:

Sg + 6 CO → Sg(CO)_{6}

== Reactivity ==
Seaborgium hexacarbonyl reacts and interacts with a SiO_{2} surface in ways closely resembling its lighter structural analogs, molybdenum hexacarbonyl and tungsten hexacarbonyl. The bond dissociation energy of the Sg–CO bond in Sg(CO)_{6} was also measured to be 188 kJ/mol, which is less than of the W–CO bond due to relativistic effects.
