= Tungsten hexacarbonyl =

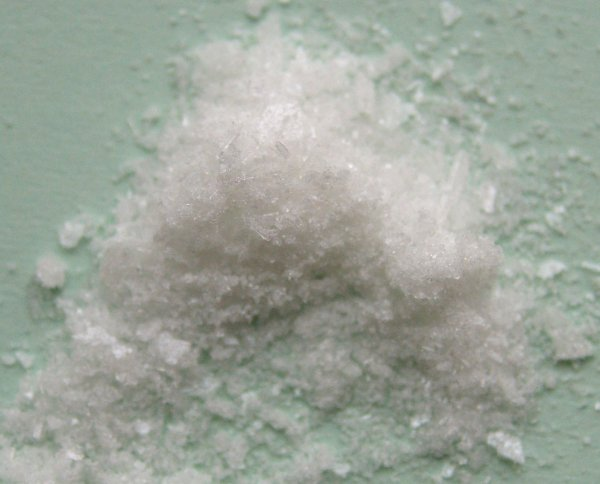

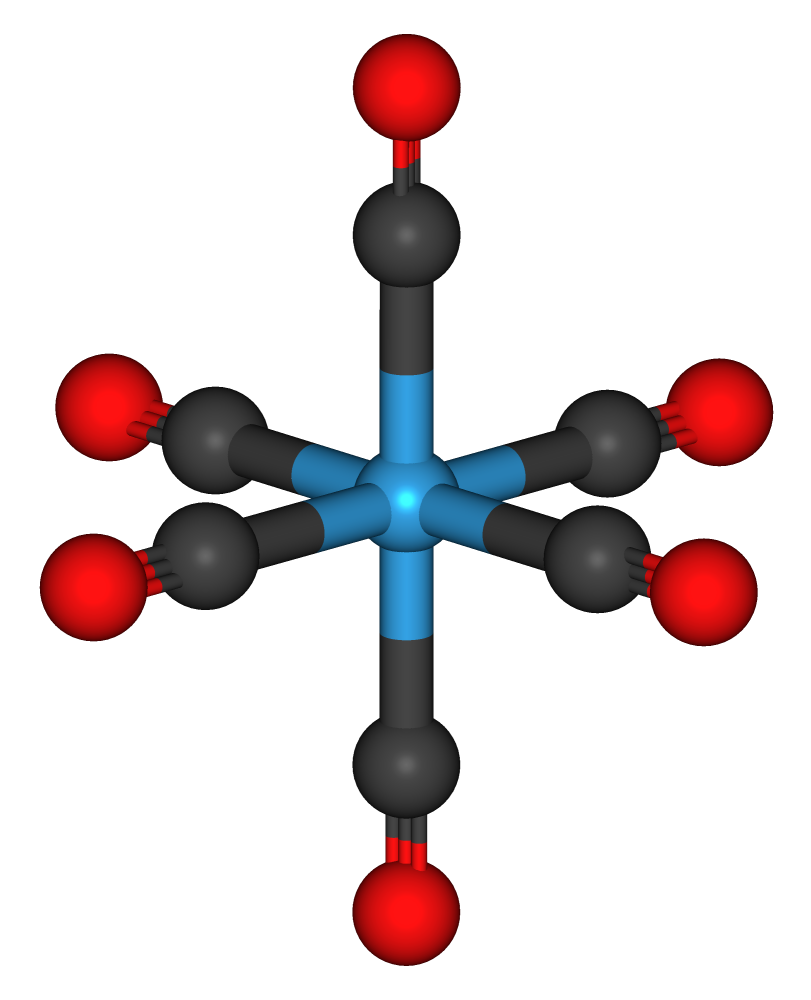

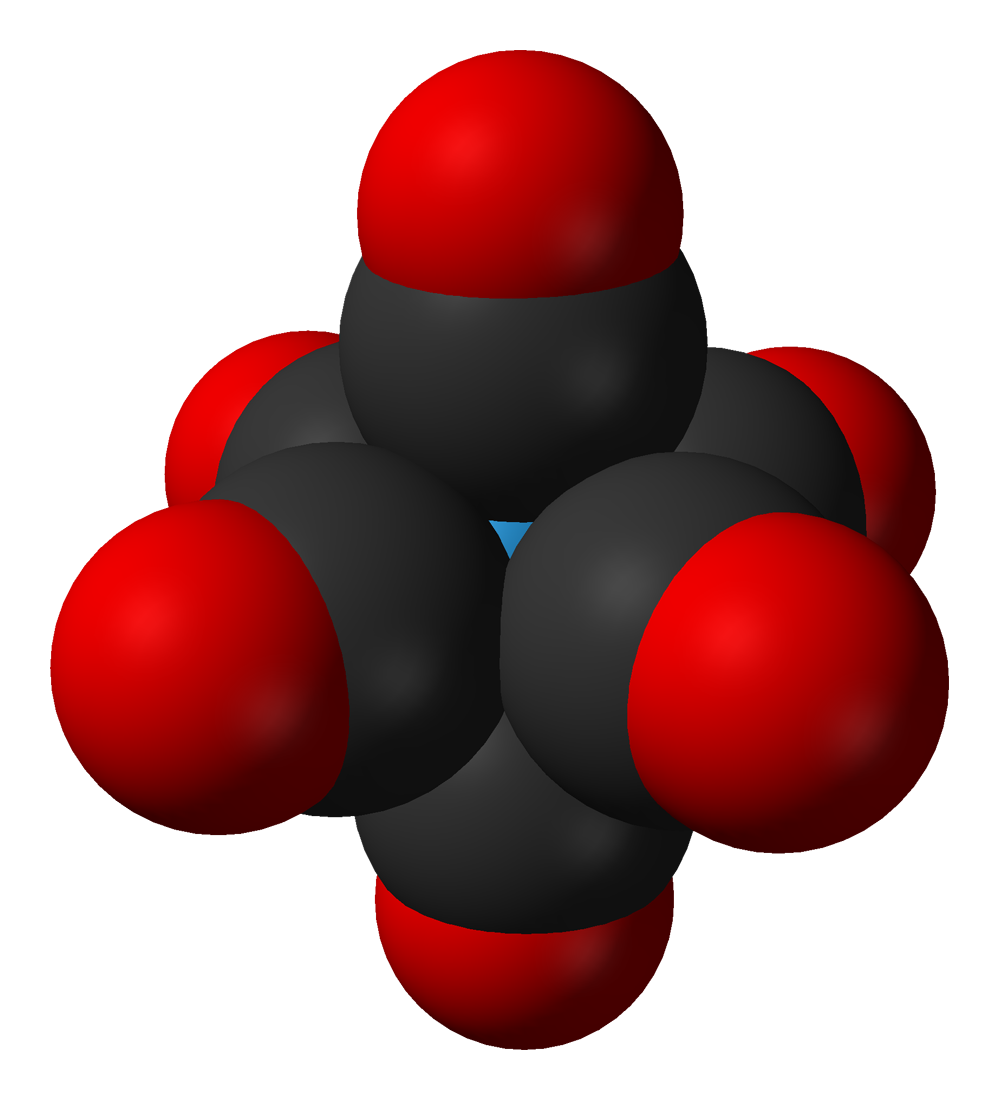

Names
- IUPAC name Hexacarbonyltungsten
- Other names Tungsten carbonyl Hexacarbonylwolfram

Identifiers
CAS Number	14040-11-0
3D model (JSmol)	Interactive image
ChemSpider	89313
ECHA InfoCard	100.034.423
EC Number	237-880-2
PubChem CID	98884
CompTox Dashboard (EPA)	DTXSID20895051
- InChI: InChI=1/6CO.W/c6*1-2; Key: FQNHWXHRAUXLFU-UHFFFAOYSA-N
- SMILES: O=C=[W](=C=O)(=C=O)(=C=O)(=C=O)=C=O

Properties
Chemical formula	C_{6}O_{6}W
Molar mass	351.901 g/mol
Appearance	Colorless solid
Density	2.65 g/cm^{3}
Melting point	170 °C (338 °F; 443 K) (decomposes)
Solubility in water	insoluble
Solubility	sparingly in THF

Hazards
- Occupational safety and health (OHS/OSH)
Main hazards	Flammable, CO source

Hazards
NFPA 704 (fire diamond)	2 0 0
Safety data sheet (SDS)	External SDS

Related compounds
Other cations	Chromium hexacarbonyl Molybdenum hexacarbonyl Seaborgium hexacarbonyl
- Except where otherwise noted, data are given for materials in their standard state (at 25 °C [77 °F], 100 kPa). verify (what is ?) Infobox references

Tungsten hexacarbonyl (also called tungsten carbonyl) is an organometallic compound with the formula W(CO)_{6}. This complex gave rise to the first example of a dihydrogen complex.

Like its chromium and molybdenum analogs, this colorless compound is noteworthy as a volatile, air-stable derivative of tungsten in its zero oxidation state.

== Preparation, properties, and structure ==
Like many metal carbonyls, W(CO)_{6} is generally prepared by "reductive carbonylation", which involves the reduction of a metal halide with under an atmosphere of carbon monoxide. As described in a 2023 survey of methods "most cost-effective routes for the synthesis of group 6 hexacarbonyls are based on the reduction of the metal chlorides (CrCl_{3}, MoCl_{5} or WCl_{6}) with magnesium, zinc or aluminium powders... under CO pressures". Another means of preparation involves heating iron pentacarbonyl and WCl_{6}, resulting in the formation of ferrous chloride. The compound is relatively air-stable. It is sparingly soluble in nonpolar organic solvents. Tungsten carbonyl is widely used in electron beam-induced deposition technique - it is easily vaporized and decomposed by the electron beam providing a convenient source of tungsten atoms.

W(CO)_{6} adopts an octahedral geometry consisting of six rod-like CO ligands radiating from the central W atom with dipole moment 0 debye.

== Reactivity ==
All reactions of W(CO)_{6} commence with displacement of some CO ligands in W(CO)_{6}. W(CO)_{6} behaves similarly to the Mo(CO)_{6} but tends to form compounds that are kinetically more robust.

Cyclopentadienyltungsten tricarbonyl dimer ((C_{5}H_{5})_{2}W_{2}(CO)_{6}) is produced from W(CO)_{6}.

Treatment of tungsten hexacarbonyl with sodium cyclopentadienide followed by oxidation of the resulting NaW(CO)_{3}(C_{5}H_{5}) gives cyclopentadienyltungsten tricarbonyl dimer.

One derivative is the dihydrogen complex W(CO)_{3}[P(C_{6}H_{11})_{3}]_{2}(H_{2}).

Three of these CO ligands can be displaced by acetonitrile. W(CO)_{6} has been used to desulfurize organosulfur compounds and as a precursor to catalysts for alkene metathesis.

== Safety and handling ==
Like all metal carbonyls, W(CO)_{6} is a dangerous source of volatile metal as well as CO.
