= Dimanganese decacarbonyl =

- Dimanganese decacarbonyl

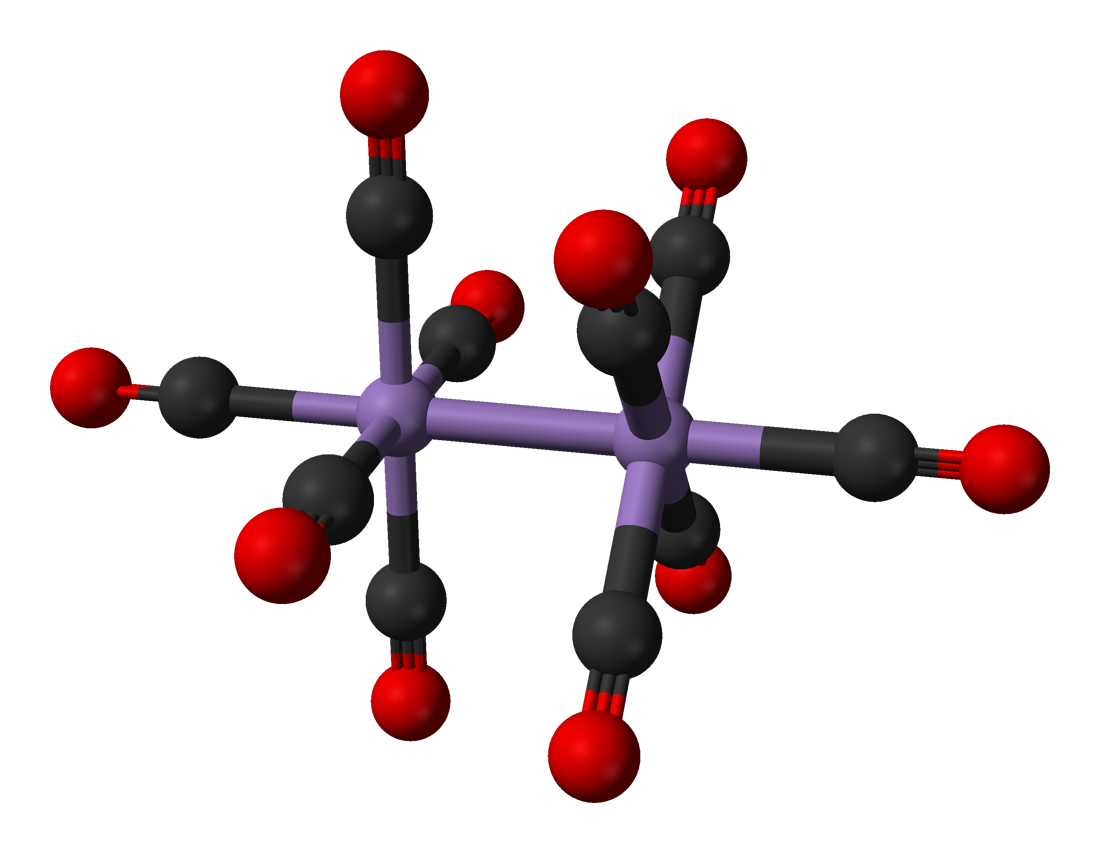

Names
- IUPAC name bis(pentacarbonylmanganese)(Mn—Mn)
- Other names Manganese carbonyl Decacarbonyldimanganese

Identifiers
CAS Number	10170-69-1
3D model (JSmol)	Interactive image
ChemSpider	451751
ECHA InfoCard	100.030.392
EC Number	233-445-6
PubChem CID	6096972
UNII	85SI7K7FWW
CompTox Dashboard (EPA)	DTXSID50895049
- InChI: InChI=1S/10CO.2Mn/c10*1-2;; Key: QFEOTYVTTQCYAZ-UHFFFAOYSA-N; InChI=1/10CO.2Mn/c10*1-2;; Key: QFEOTYVTTQCYAZ-UHFFFAOYAD
- SMILES: O=C=[Mn](=C=O)(=C=O)(=C=O)(=C=O)[Mn](=C=O)(=C=O)(=C=O)(=C=O)=C=O

Properties
Chemical formula	Mn_{2}(CO)_{10}
Molar mass	389.98 g/mol
Appearance	Yellow crystals
Density	1.750 g/cm^{3}
Melting point	154 °C (309 °F; 427 K)
Boiling point	sublimes 60 °C (140 °F; 333 K) at 0.5 mm Hg
Solubility in water	Insoluble

Structure
Crystal structure	monoclinic
Lattice constant	a = 14.14 Å, b = 7.10 Å, c = 14.63 Å α = 90°, β = 105.2°, γ = 90°
Formula units (Z)	4
Dipole moment	0 D

Hazards
- Occupational safety and health (OHS/OSH)
Main hazards	CO source
- GHS labelling
Pictograms	(GHS06: Toxic)
Signal word	Danger
Hazard statements	H301, H311, H331
Precautionary statements	P261, P264, P270, P271, P280, P301+P310, P302+P352, P304+P340, P311, P312, P321, P322, P330, P361, P363, P403+P233, P405, P501

Related compounds
Related compounds	Re_{2}(CO)_{10} Co_{2}(CO)_{8} Fe_{3}(CO)_{12} Fe_{2}(CO)_{9}
- Except where otherwise noted, data are given for materials in their standard state (at 25 °C [77 °F], 100 kPa). verify (what is ?) Infobox references

Dimanganese decacarbonyl, which has the chemical formula Mn_{2}(CO)_{10}, is a binary bimetallic carbonyl complex centered around the first row transition metal manganese. The first reported synthesis of Mn_{2}(CO)_{10} was in 1954 at Linde Air Products Company and was performed by Brimm, Lynch, and Sesny. Their hypothesis about, and synthesis of, dimanganese decacarbonyl was fundamentally guided by the previously known dirhenium decacarbonyl (Re_{2}(CO)_{10}), the heavy atom analogue of Mn_{2}(CO)_{10}. Since its first synthesis, Mn_{2}(CO)_{10} has been use sparingly as a reagent in the synthesis of other chemical species, but has found the most use as a simple system on which to study fundamental chemical and physical phenomena, most notably, the metal-metal bond. Dimanganese decacarbonyl is also used as a classic example to reinforce fundamental topics in organometallic chemistry like d-electron count, the 18-electron rule, oxidation state, valency, and the isolobal analogy.

A sample of Manganese Carbonyl

== Synthesis ==
Many procedures have been reported for the synthesis of Mn_{2}(CO)_{10} since 1954. Some of these methods serendipitously produce Mn_{2}(CO)_{10}.

=== Reductive carbonylation ===
The reductive carbonylation route involves treatment of Mn(II) salt under high pressure of CO and in the presence of a reductant. This is the method reported in 1954 by Brimm, Lynch, and Sesny, albeit in yields of ~1%. They used manganese(II) iodide with magnesium(0) as the reductant under 3000 psi (~200 atm) of carbon monoxide (CO):

2 MnI_{2} + 2 Mg + 10 CO → Mn_{2}(CO)_{10} + 2 MgI_{2}

A more efficient preparation was developed in 1958 and entails reduction of anhydrous manganese(II) chloride with sodium benzophenone ketyl radical under similarly high pressures (200 atm) of CO. The yield is ~32%.

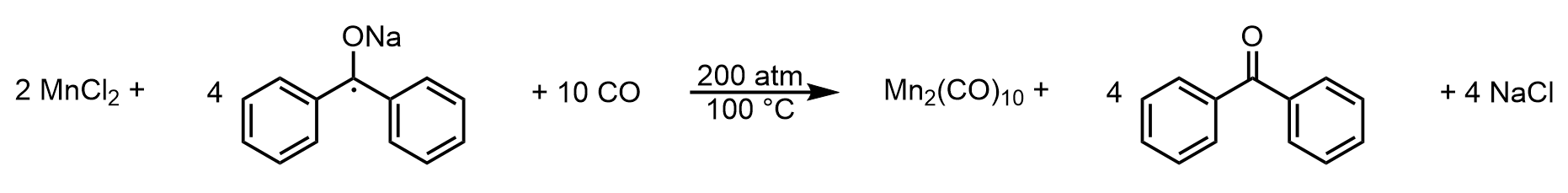
High pressure carbonylation synthesis of dianganese decacarbonyl by reduction with sodium ketyl

==== Low pressure carbonylation ====
An ambient pressure synthesis of Mn_{2}(CO)_{10} was reported from the commercially available and inexpensive methylcyclopentadienyl manganese tricarbonyl (MMT) and sodium(0) as the reductant. The balanced equation being:

2 Mn(η^{1}-(_{5})−(CH_{3}C_{5}H_{4})(CO)_{3} + 2 Na + 4 CO → Mn_{2}(CO)_{10} + 2NaCH_{3}C_{5}H_{4}

The efficiency of the method ranged from 16 to 20% yield, lower than what was previously reported, however, it could be performed more conveniently and on mole scale.

=== Dimerization syntheses ===
Pentacarbonylhydridomanganese(-I) Mn source, oxidized by Se(PF_{2})_{2}:
$$\ce{2 Mn(CO)5(H) + Se(PF2)2 -> Mn2(CO)10 + PF2H + Se=PF2H}$$
Other terminal oxidants achieve the same effect, and stable pentacarbonylmanganate (Mn(CO)^{−}_{5}) salts can substitute for the hydride. Thus for example triphenylcyclopropenium tetrafluoroborate reacts with sodium pentacarbonyl manganate to produce the dimer of each:

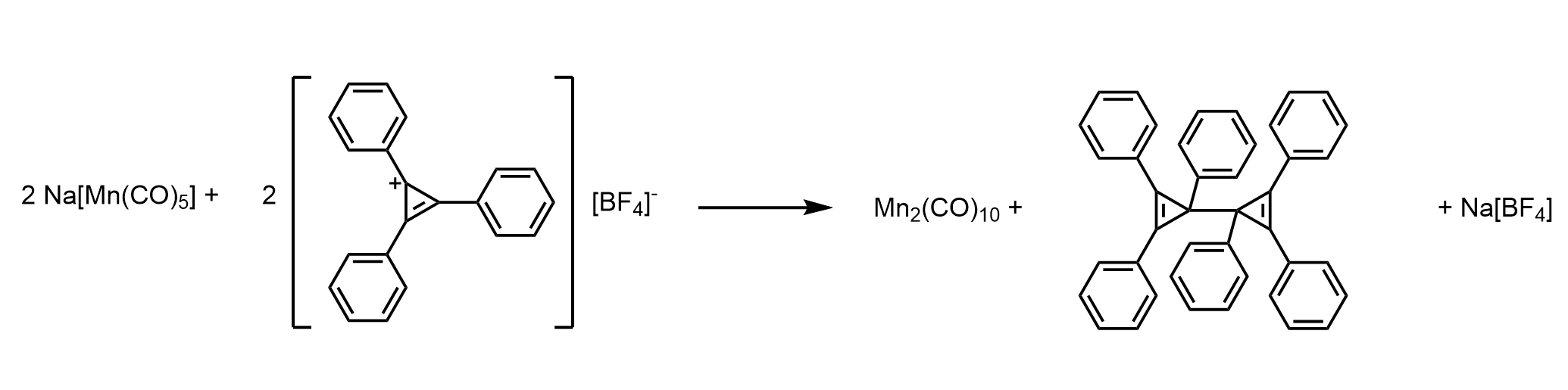
Synthesis of dimanganese decacarbonyl by reduction of cyclopropenium ion

Similar methods exist for Mn(CO)_{5}X compounds where X = Cl, Br, or I; and, more rarely, for Mn(CO)^{+}_{6} bound with a weakly coordinating anion. One additional interesting synthesis of Mn_{2}(CO)_{10} occurs by combination of a hexacarbonylmanganese(I) tetrafluoroborate salt with a sodium pentacarbonyl manganate salt. In this instance, manganese is both the oxidant and reductant, producing two formal Mn(0) atoms:
$$\ce{[Mn(CO)6](BF4) + Na[Mn(CO)5] -> Mn2(CO)10 + Na[BF4] + CO}$$

== Structure and bonding ==
This hypothesized structure was confirmed explicitly through x-ray diffraction studies, first in two dimensions in 1957, followed by its single crystal three-dimensional analysis in 1963. The crystal structure of Mn_{2}(CO)_{10} was redetermined at high precision at room temperature in 1981 and bond lengths mentioned herein refer to results from that study. Mn_{2}(CO)_{10} has no bridging CO ligands: it can be described as containing two axially-linked (CO)_{5}Mn- subunits. These Mn subunits are spaced at a distance of 290.38(6) pm, a bonding distance that is longer than that predicted. Two CO ligands are linked to each Mn atom that is coaxial with the Mn-Mn bond and four “equatorial” carbonyls bonded to each Mn atom that are nearly perpendicular to the Mn-Mn bond (Mn’-Mn-CO(equatorial) angles range from 84.61(7) to 89.16(7) degrees). The axial carbonyl distance of (181.1 pm) is 4.5 pm shorter than the average equatorial manganese-carbonyl distance of 185.6 pm. In the stable rotamer, the two Mn(CO)_{5} subunits are staggered. Thus, the overall molecule has approximate point group D_{4d} symmetry, which is an uncommon symmetry shared with S_{2}F_{10}. The Mn_{2}(CO)_{10} molecule is isomorphous with the other group 7 binary metal carbonyls Tc_{2}(CO)_{10} and Re_{2}(CO)_{10}.

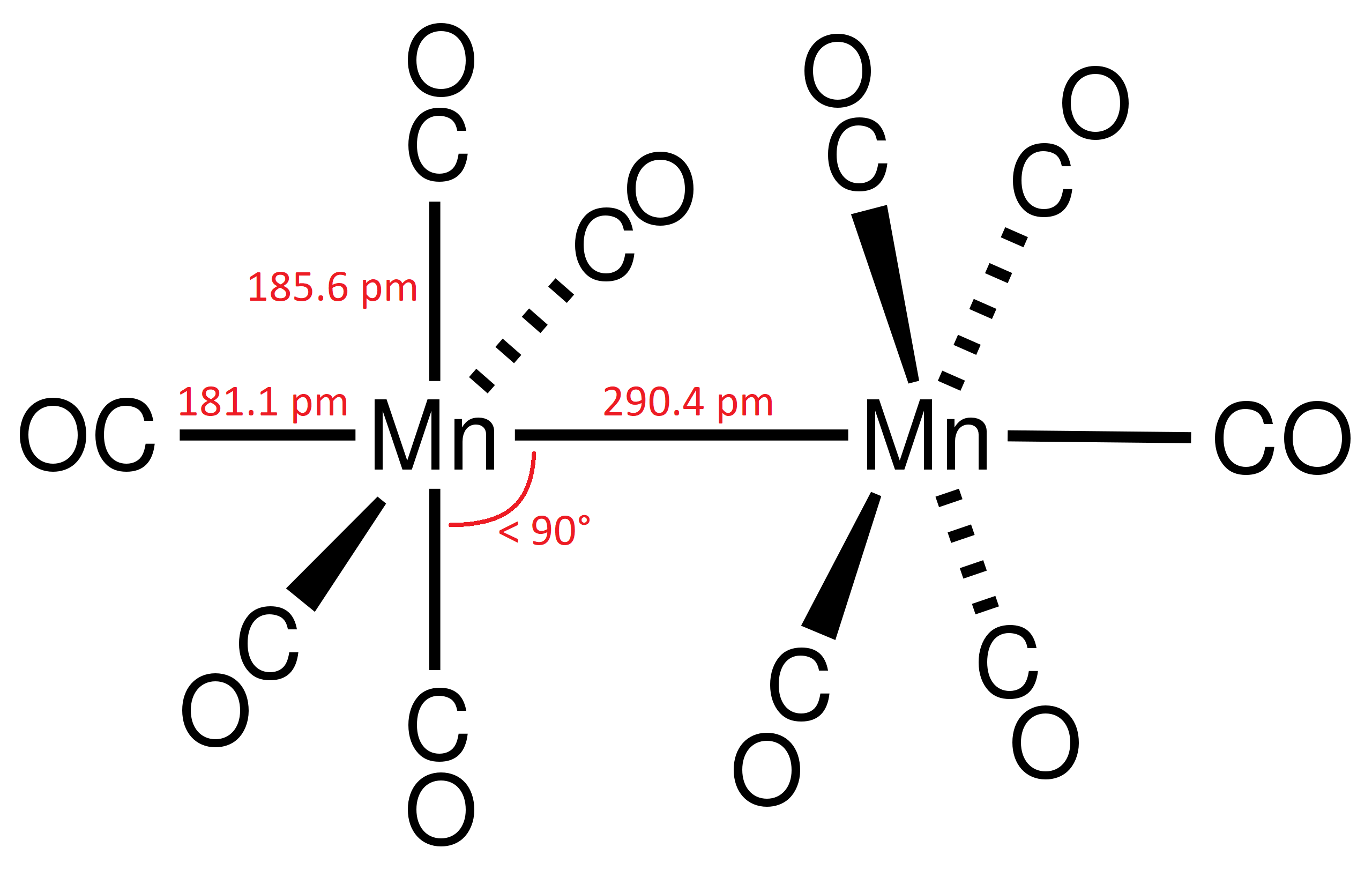
Important bond lengths and angles of dimanganese decacarbonyl

=== Electronic structure ===
Initial fundamental experimental and theoretical studies on the electronic structure of Mn_{2}(CO)_{10} were performed used a mixture of photoelectron spectroscopy, infrared spectroscopy, and an iterative extended-Hückel-type molecular orbital calculation. The electronic structure of Mn_{2}(CO)_{10} was most reported in 2017 using the BP86D functional with TZP basis set. The electronic structure described herein, along with relevant orbital plots, are reproduced from the methods used in that study using Orca (5.0.3) and visualized using IBOView (v20150427). The two main interactions of interest in the system are the metal-to-ligand pi-backbonding interactions and the metal-metal sigma bonding orbital. The pi-backbonding interactions illustrated below occur between the t_{2g} d-orbital set and the CO π* antibonding orbitals. The degenerate d_{xz} and d_{yz} backbonding interactions with both axial and equatorial CO ligands is the HOMO-15. More total delocalization occurs onto the axial CO antibonding orbital than does the equatorial, which is thought to rationalize the shorter Mn-C bond length. The primary Mn-Mn σ-bonding orbital is composed of two d_{z2} orbitals, represented by the HOMO-9. Other large contributions made in this area were by Ahmed Zewail using ultrafast, femtosecond spectroscopy en route to his 1999 Nobel Prize. His discoveries elucidated much about the time scales and energies associated with the molecular motions of Mn_{2}(CO)_{10}, as well as the Mn-Mn and Mn-C bond cleavage events.

== Reactivity ==
Mn_{2}(CO)_{10} is air stable as a crystalline solid, but solutions require Schlenk techniques. Mn_{2}(CO)_{10} is chemically active at both the Mn-Mn and Mn-CO bonds due to low, and similar, bond dissociation energies of ~36 kcal/mol (151 kJ/mol) and ~38 kcal/mol (160 kJ/mol), respectively. For this reason, reactivity can happen at either site of the molecule, sometimes selectively.

=== Mn-Mn bond cleavage reactions ===
The Mn-Mn bond is sensitive to both oxidation and reduction, producing two equivalents of the corresponding Mn(I) and Mn(-I) species, respectively. Both of the potential resultant species can be derived further. Redox neutral cleavage is possible both thermally and photochemically, producing two equivalents of the Mn(0) radical.

==== Oxidative cleavage ====
Selective mono-oxidation of the Mn-Mn bond is most often done via addition of classical metal oxidants (e.g. Ce^{IV}, Pb^{IV}, etc) or weak homonuclear single covalent bonds of the form X-X (X is group 16 or 17 element). These reactions yield the [Mn(CO)_{5}]^{+} cation with a bound weakly coordinating anion, or the Mn(CO)_{5}X complex. The general reaction schemes for each are seen as balanced equations below:
$$\ce{Mn2(CO)10 + 2 M^{n}X_{n} -> 2Mn(CO)5X + 2M^{(n-1)}X_{(n-1)}}$$
or for two-electron oxidants
$$\ce{Mn2(CO)10 + M^{n}X_{n} -> 2Mn(CO)5X + M^{(n-2)}X_{(n-2)}}$$
and
$$\ce{Mn2(CO)10 + RE-ER -> 2Mn(CO)5(ER)}$$
for E = O, S, Se, Te
$$\ce{Mn2(CO)10 + X-X -> 2Mn(CO)5X}$$
for X = F, Cl, Br, I

==== Reductive cleavage ====
Reductive cleavage is almost always done with sodium metal, yielding the [Mn(CO)_{5}]^{−} anion with the sodium counterion. The balanced general reactions are given below:
$$\ce{Mn2(CO)10 + 2 Na^{0} -> 2Na[Mn(CO)5]}$$
The resultant manganate anion is a potent nucleophile, which can be protonated to give the manganese hydride, or alkylated with organic halides to give a large swath of organomanganese(I) complexes.

Further reduction gives Na_{3}Mn(CO)_{4}.

==== Redox-neutral cleavage ====
Homolytic cleavage, usually via light, but sometimes heat, gives the Mn(0) metalloradical, which can react with itself to reform Mn_{2}(CO)_{10}, or combine with other radical species that usually result in formal oxidation to Mn(I). This reactivity is comparable to that of organic, carbon-based radicals via the isolobal analogy. The homolytic cleavage is given by:
$$\ce{Mn2(CO)10 + h\nu -> 2[Mn(CO)5]^{.}}$$
The use of the produced radical species, [Mn(CO)_{5}]*, has found several applications as a radical initiator for various organic methodologies and polymerization reactions.

=== Ligand substitution reactions ===
Ligand substitution reactions that do not disrupt the Mn-Mn bonding is done by using strongly sigma donating L-type ligands that can outcompete CO without participating in redox reactivity. This requirement usually necessitates phosphines or N-heterocyclic carbenes (NHCs), with substitution occurring at the axial position according to the reactions below:

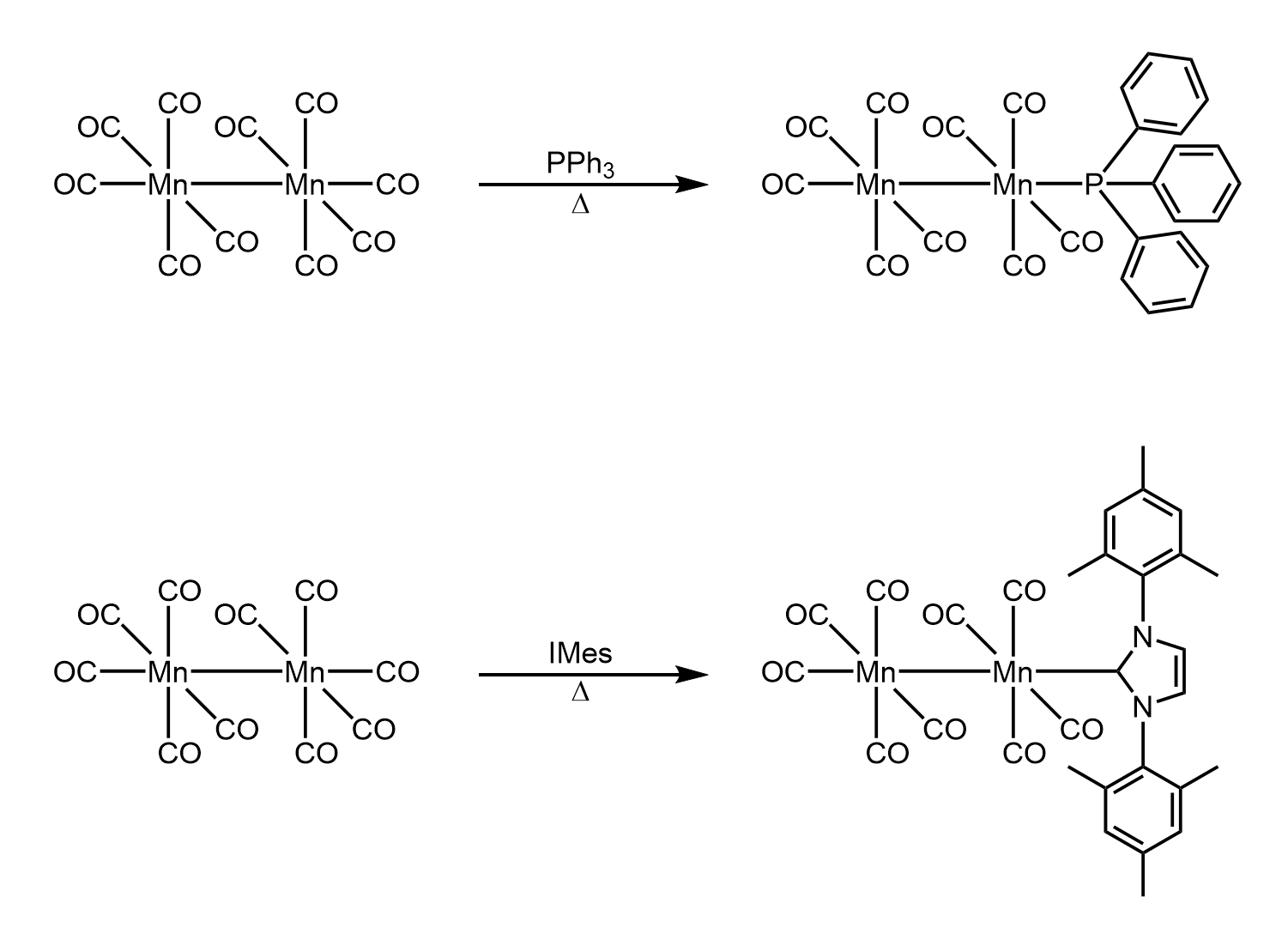
Representative axial ligand substitution reactions of dimanganese decacarbonyl

== Safety ==
Mn_{2}(CO)_{10} is a volatile source of a metal and a source of CO.
