= Molybdenum hexacarbonyl =

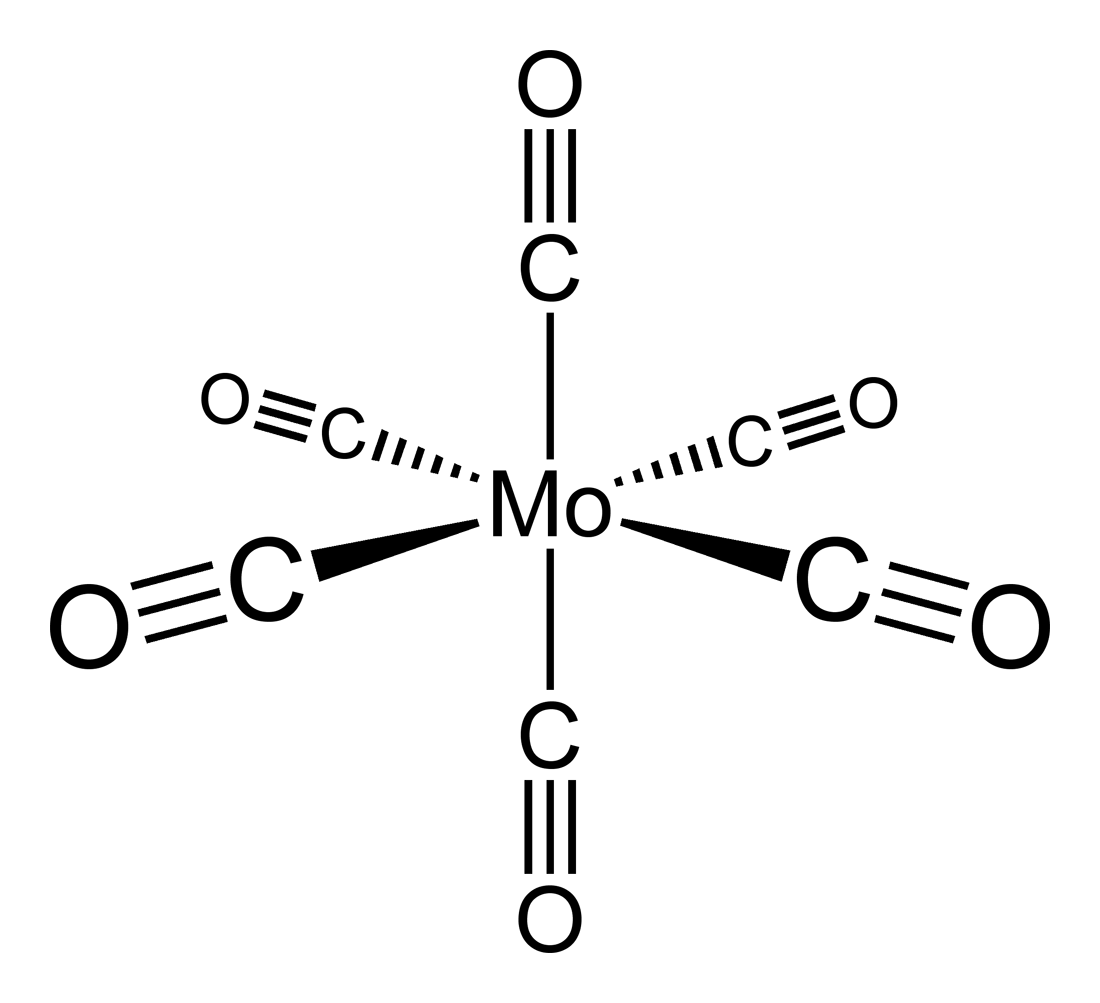
Stereo, skeletal formula of molybdenum hexacarbonyl
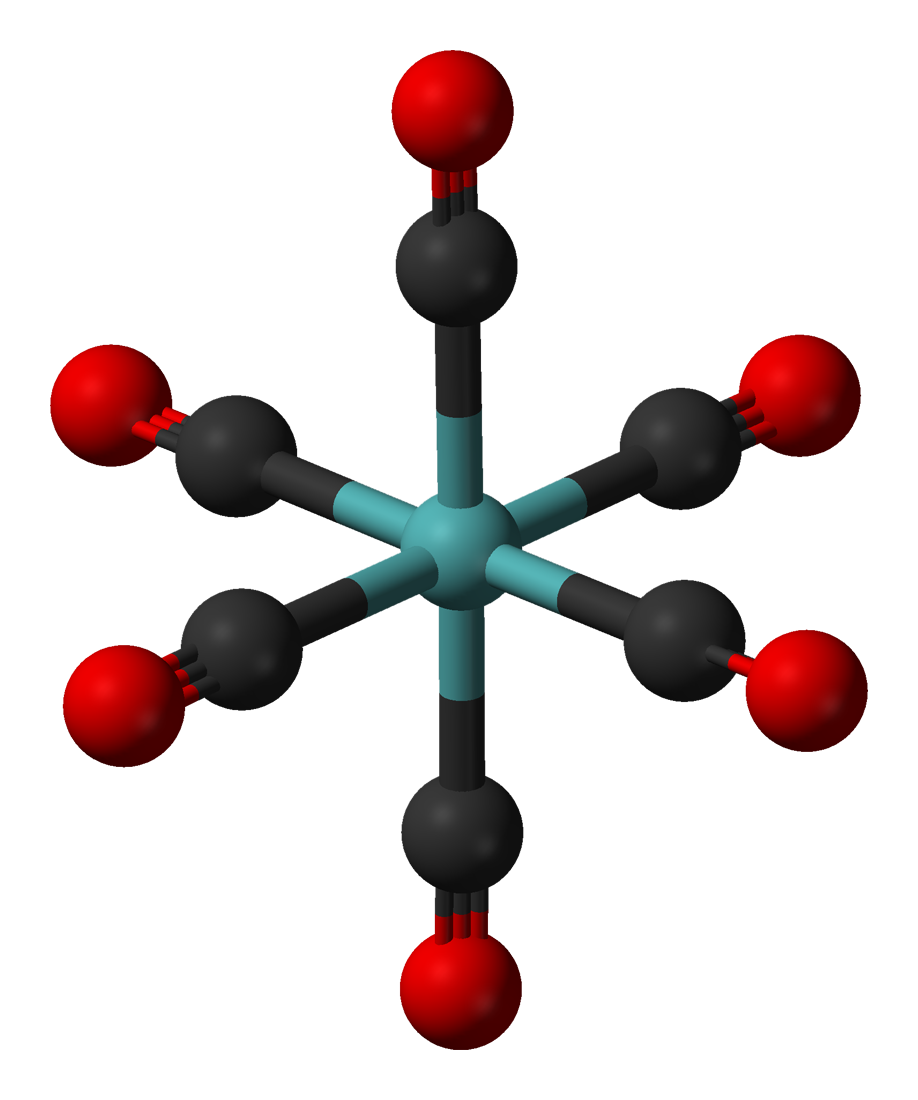
Ball and stick model of molybdenum hexacarbonyl
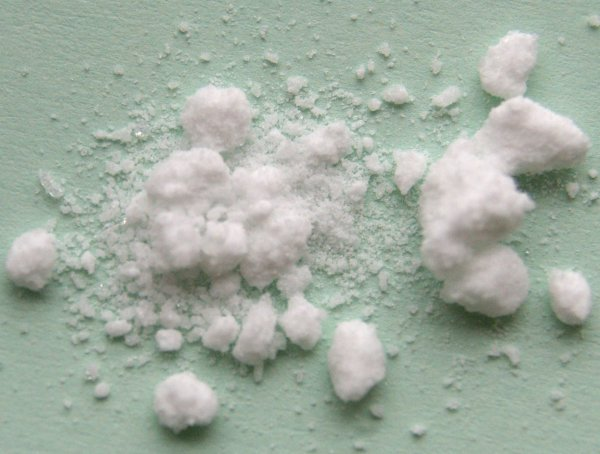
- Sample of molybdenum hexacarbonyl

Names
- IUPAC name Hexacarbonylmolybdenum(0)
- Systematic IUPAC name Hexacarbonylmolybdenum

Identifiers
CAS Number	13939-06-5
3D model (JSmol)	Interactive image
ChEBI	CHEBI:30508
ChemSpider	21428397
ECHA InfoCard	100.034.271
EC Number	237-713-3
Gmelin Reference	3798, 562210
MeSH	Hexacarbonylmolybdenum
PubChem CID	98885
UN number	3466
CompTox Dashboard (EPA)	DTXSID70894074
- InChI: InChI=1S/6CO.Mo/c6*1-2; Key: KMKBZNSIJQWHJA-UHFFFAOYSA-N
- SMILES: O=C=[Mo](=C=O)(=C=O)(=C=O)(=C=O)=C=O

Properties
Chemical formula	C_{6}MoO_{6}
Molar mass	264.01 g·mol^{−1}
Appearance	Vivid, white, translucent crystals
Density	1.96 g cm^{−3}
Melting point	150 °C (302 °F; 423 K)
Boiling point	156 °C (313 °F; 429 K)
Solubility in water	insoluble
Solubility	slightly soluble in THF, diglyme, acetonitrile

Structure
Crystal structure	Orthogonal
Coordination geometry	Octahedral
Dipole moment	0 D

Thermochemistry
Std enthalpy of formation (Δ_{f}H^{⦵}_{298})	−989.1 kJ mol^{−1}
Std enthalpy of combustion (Δ_{c}H^{⦵}_{298})	−2123.4 kJ mol^{−1}

Hazards
- GHS labelling
Pictograms	(GHS06: Toxic)
Signal word	Danger
Hazard statements	H300, H310, H315, H319, H330, H413
Precautionary statements	P261, P271, P280, P304+P340+P311, P405, P501
NFPA 704 (fire diamond)	4 1 0
Safety data sheet (SDS)	External MSDS

Related compounds
Related compounds	Chromium hexacarbonyl Tungsten hexacarbonyl Seaborgium hexacarbonyl
- Except where otherwise noted, data are given for materials in their standard state (at 25 °C [77 °F], 100 kPa). verify (what is ?) Infobox references

Molybdenum hexacarbonyl (also called molybdenum carbonyl) is the chemical compound with the formula Mo(CO)_{6}. This colorless solid, like its chromium, tungsten, and seaborgium analogues, is noteworthy as a volatile, air-stable derivative of a metal in its zero oxidation state.

== Structure and properties ==
Mo(CO)_{6} adopts an octahedral geometry consisting of six rod-like CO ligands radiating from the central Mo atom. A recurring minor debate in some chemical circles concerns the definition of an "organometallic" compound. Usually, organometallic indicates the presence of a metal directly bonded via a M–C bond to an organic fragment, which must in turn have a C–H bond.

Like many metal carbonyls, Mo(CO)_{6} is generally prepared by reductive carbonylation, which involves reduction of a metal halide with under an atmosphere of carbon monoxide. As described in a 2023 survey of methods "most cost-effective routes for the synthesis of group 6 hexacarbonyls are based on the reduction of the metal chlorides (CrCl_{3}, MoCl_{5} or WCl_{6}) with magnesium, zinc or aluminium powders... under CO pressures".

== Occurrence ==
Mo(CO)_{6} has been detected in landfills and sewage plants, the reducing, anaerobic environment being conducive to formation of Mo(CO)_{6}.

== Inorganic and organometallic derivatives ==
Molybdenum hexacarbonyl is a popular reagent in research. One or more CO ligands can be displaced by other ligands. Examples:

Mo(CO)_{6} + bipy → Mo(CO)_{4}(bipy) + 2 CO (bipy = 2,2′-bipyridine)
Mo(CO)_{6} + thf → Mo(CO)_{5}(thf) + CO (thf = tetrahydrofuran), this reaction requires UV radiation
Mo(CO)_{6} + 2 pip → cis—[Mo(CO)_{4}(pip)_{2}] + 2 CO (pip = piperidine)
Mo(CO)_{6} + 3 MeCN → Mo(CO)_{3}(MeCN)_{3} + 3 CO (MeCN = acetonitrile)

Some of these species are suited for substitution. For instance, the reaction of cis-[Mo(CO)_{4}(piperidine)_{2}] with triphenyl phosphine gives cis-[Mo(CO)_{4}(PPh_{3})_{2}] at lower temperatures and trans-[Mo(CO)_{4}(PPh_{3})_{2}] at higher temperatures. It is worth noting that the less thermodynamically stable cis isomer initially forms before it isomerises into the trans isomer. This is useful to scientists because it permits the synthesis of cis-[Mo(CO)_{4}(L)_{2}] (L=ligand) complexes without the thermodynamically favoured trans isomers forming instead. These techniques can then be used to design useful catalysts that would only work with a cis complex.

[Mo(CO)_{3}(MeCN)_{3} serves as a source of "Mo(CO)_{3}". For instance treatment with allyl chloride gives [MoCl(allyl)(CO)_{2}(MeCN)_{2}], whereas treatment with KTp and sodium cyclopentadienide gives [MoTp(CO)_{3}]^{−} and [MoCp(CO)_{3}]^{−} anions, respectively. These anions react with a variety of electrophiles. A related source of Mo(CO)_{3} is cycloheptatrienemolybdenum tricarbonyl.

=== Organic synthesis ===
Mo(CO)_{6}, [Mo(CO)_{3}(MeCN)_{3}], and related derivatives are employed as catalysts or reagents in organic synthesis for example, alkyne metathesis and the Pauson–Khand reaction. The hexacarbonyl can serve as a source of CO.

=== Source of Mo atoms ===
Molybdenum hexacarbonyl is widely used in electron beam-induced deposition technique - it is easily vaporized and decomposed by the electron beam providing a convenient source of molybdenum atoms.

== Safety and handling ==
Like all metal carbonyls, Mo(CO)_{6} is a dangerous source of volatile metal as well as CO.
