= Metal carbonyl hydride =

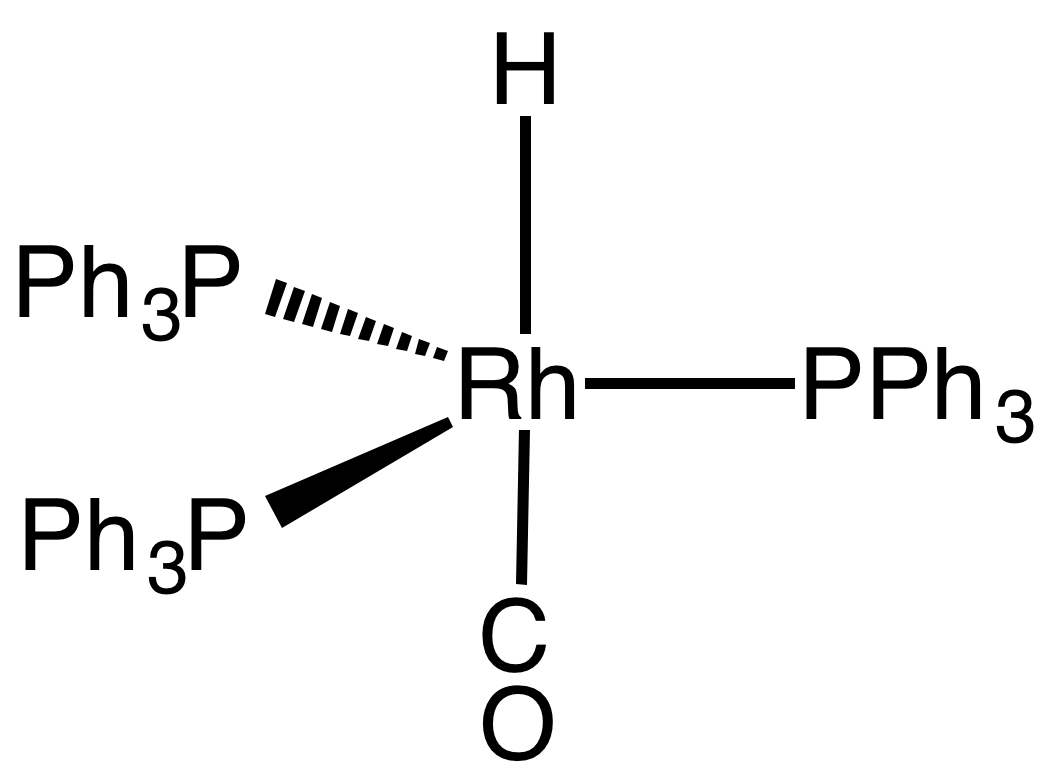
A commercially important rhodium carbonyl hydride.

Metal carbonyl hydrides are complexes of transition metals with carbon monoxide and hydride as ligands. These complexes are useful in organic synthesis as catalysts in homogeneous catalysis, such as hydroformylation.

== Preparation ==
Decacarbonyldihydridotriosmium is one of many polymetallic carbonyl hydrides.

Walter Hieber et al. prepared the first metal carbonyl hydride in 1931 by the so-called Hieber base reaction of metal carbonyls. In this reaction a hydroxide ion reacts with the carbon monoxide ligand of a metal carbonyl such as iron pentacarbonyl in a nucleophilic attack to form a metallacarboxylic acid. This intermedia releases of carbon dioxide in a second step, giving the iron tetracarbonyl hydride anion. The synthesis of cobalt tetracarbonyl hydride (HCo(CO)_{4}) proceeds in the same way.

Fe(CO)_{5} + NaOH → Na[Fe(CO)_{4}CO_{2}H]
Na[Fe(CO)_{4}CO_{2}H] → Na[HFe(CO)_{4}] + CO_{2}

A further synthetic route is the reaction of the metal carbonyl with hydrogen. The protonation of metal carbonyl anions, e.g. [Co(CO)_{4}]^{−}, leads also to the formation of metal carbonyl hydrides.

== Properties ==
Some Metal Carbonyl Hydrides
Metal Carbonyl hydride	pK_{a}
HCo(CO)_{4}	1
HCo(CO)_{3}(P(OPh)_{3})	5.0
HCo(CO)_{3}(PPh_{3})	7.0
HMn(CO)_{5}	7.1
H_{2}Fe(CO)_{4}	4.4, 14
HRh(CO)(PPh_{3})_{3}	unknown

The neutral metal carbonyl hydrides are often volatile and can be quite acidic. The hydrogen atom is directly bounded to the metal. The metal-hydrogen bond length is for cobalt 114 pm, the metal-carbon bond length is for axial ligands 176 and 182 for the equatorial ligands.

A direct metal-hydrogen bond was suspected by Hieber for H_{2}Fe(CO)_{4}. A number of metal carbonyl hydrides have been characterized by X-ray crystallography and neutron diffraction. Nuclear magnetic resonance spectroscopy has also proved to be a useful characterization tool.

== Applications and occurrence ==
Metal carbonyl hydrides are used as catalysts in the hydroformylation of olefins. The catalyst is usually formed in situ in a reaction of a metal salt precursor with the syngas. The hydroformylation starts with the generation of a coordinatively unsaturated 16-electron metal carbonyl hydride complex like HCo(CO)_{3} or HRh(CO)(PPh_{3})_{2} by dissociation of a ligand. Such complexes bind olefins in a first step via π-complexation, thus beginning the transformation of the alkene to the aldehyde.

Iron carbonyl hydrides occur in nature at the active sites of hydrogenase enzymes.
