= Lability =

Tendency to undergo change: instability

Lability refers to the degree that something is likely to undergo change. It is the opposite (antonym) of stability.

== Biochemistry ==
In reference to biochemistry, this is an important concept as far as kinetics is concerned in metalloproteins. This can allow for the rapid synthesis and degradation of substrates in biological systems.

== Biology ==
=== Cells ===
Labile cells refer to cells that constantly divide by entering and remaining in the cell cycle. These are contrasted with "stable cells" and "permanent cells".

An important example of this is in the epithelium of the cornea, where cells divide at the basal level and move upwards, and the topmost cells die and fall off.

=== Proteins ===
In medicine, the term "labile" means susceptible to alteration or destruction. For example, a heat-labile protein is one that can be changed or destroyed at high temperatures.

The opposite of labile in this context is "stable".

=== Soils ===
Compounds or materials that are easily transformed (often by biological activity) are termed labile. For example, labile phosphate is that fraction of soil phosphate that is readily transformed into soluble or plant-available phosphate. Labile organic matter is the soil organic matter that is easily decomposed by microorganisms.

== Chemistry ==
The term is used to describe a transient chemical species. As a general example, if a molecule exists in a particular conformation for a short lifetime, before adopting a lower energy conformation (structural arrangement), the former molecular structure is said to have "high lability" (such as C_{25}, a 25-carbon fullerene spheroid). The term is sometimes also used in reference to reactivity – for example, a complex that quickly reaches equilibrium in solution is said to be labile (with respect to that solution). Another common example is the cis effect in organometallic chemistry, which is the labilization of CO ligands in the cis position of octahedral transition metal complexes.

== See also ==
- Chemical stability
- Emotional lability
- Equilibrium chemistry
- Dynamic equilibrium
- Instability
- Metastability
- Reaction intermediate
