= Alkaline earth octacarbonyl complex =

Class of chemical compounds

Generic structure for alkaline earth octacarbonyl complex where M is the metal center of Ca, Sr, or Ba

Alkaline earth octacarbonyl complexes are a class of neutral compounds that have the general formula M(CO)_{8} where M is a heavy Group 2 element (Ca, Sr, or Ba). The metal center has a formal oxidation state of 0 and the complex has a high level of symmetry belonging to the cubic O_{h} point group. These complexes are isolable in a low-temperature neon matrix. The bonding within these complexes is controversial with some arguing the bonding resembles a model similar to bonding in transition metal carbonyl complexes which abide by the 18-electron rule, and others arguing the molecule more accurately contains ionic bonds between the alkaline earth metal center and the carbonyl ligands. Complexes of Be(CO)_{8} and Mg(CO)_{8} are not synthetically possible due to inaccessible (n-1)d orbitals. Beryllium has been found to form a dinuclear homoleptic carbonyl and magnesium a mononuclear heteroleptic carbonyl, both with only two carbonyl ligands instead of eight to each metal atom.

== Synthesis and characterization ==
The first reported alkaline earth octacarbonyl complex, Ba(CO)_{8}, was first generated by Xuan Wu and Gernot Frenking in 2018. The complexes Ca(CO)_{8} and Sr(CO)_{8}, were then produced shortly afterwards using a similar method. In the "synthesis," the alkaline earth metal is produced through the ablation of a metal (Ca, Sr, or Ba) target with a laser, and then co-deposited with differing concentrations of carbon monoxide (0.02 to 0.2% in excess neon) onto a cryogenic window. In low concentrations of carbon monoxide, low coordinate complexes such as the di-, tri- and tetracarbonyl molecules can by synthesized. Under high CO concentrations, the octacarbonyl complex is observed.

Alkaline earth carbonyl complexes are characterized through infrared spectroscopy and mass spectrometry. In their infrared spectrs only one unique carbonyl stretching band is observed suggesting that these molecules have cubic O_{h} symmetry. Infrared spectra of octacarbonyl complexes radio-labeled with a mixture of ^{12}C^{16}O, ^{13}C^{16}O and complexes labeled with a mixture of ^{13}C^{16}O, and ^{13}C^{18}O also contain a single carbonyl stretching band indicating further successful synthesis of alkaline earth octacarbonyl complexes. In infrared spectroscopy of the complexes, the carbonyl stretching frequency is red-shifted compared to the infrared carbonyl stretch of a free CO molecule (2143 cm^{−1}). This shift could possibly be due to the strong π back-donation interaction of the metal center to the CO ligands or noncovalent intermolecular interactions between neighboring carbonyl ligands. Transition metal carbonyl complexes also depict a red-shifted absorption peak due to π back-donation interactions. The normal range for a C≡O stretch is 1850 cm^{−1} to 2150 cm^{−1}. Typical mass spectra feature numerous peaks with mass to charge ratios corresponding to various [M(CO)_{n}]^{+} species where n is the number of CO ligands.

== Structure and properties ==
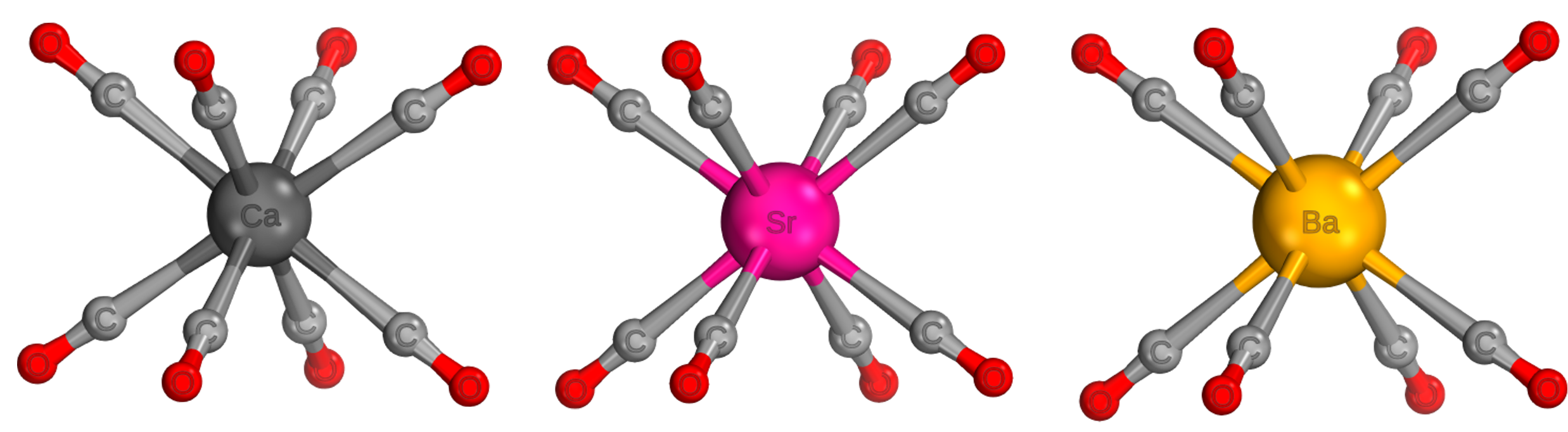
Calculated equilibrium geometries with the M06-2X-D3/def2-TZVPP method of Ca(CO)_{8}, Sr(CO)_{8}, and Ba(CO)_{8}

The calculated M-CO and C≡O bond lengths from the equilibrium geometry of each M(CO)_{8} complex are shown in the table below. Bond length between the alkaline earth center and the CO ligand increases with increasing mass of the central atom. The C≡O bond length decreases with increasing mass of the central atom. Carbonyl stretching frequencies in infrared spectroscopy occur between 1975 cm^{−1} to 2025 cm^{−1}. The infrared carbonyl stretch of a free CO molecule is 2143 cm^{−1}. Relative to the infrared absorption of the free CO molecule, the infrared peaks of M(CO)_{8} complexes are red shifted.

Alkaline earth octacarbonyl complexes are air and water sensitive. They have no known applications.

Metal Center	M-CO bond length	C≡O bond length	C≡O Stretching Frequency
Ca	2.602 Å	1.127 Å	1987 cm^{−1}
Sr	2.751 Å	1.126 Å	1995 cm^{−1}
Ba	2.960 Å	1.123 Å	2014 cm^{−1}

== Bonding controversy ==
Group 2 alkaline earth elements have two valence electrons in an ns^{2} configuration, and typically use their s and p valence orbitals for bonding. The heavier Group 2 elements, Ca, Sr, and Ba, in the group are capable of using their empty (n-1)d orbitals for bonding and no longer abide by the 'octet rule'. Two models for bonding in these octacarbonyl metals are possible: a covalent model similar to bonding in transition metal carbonyl complexes which abide by the 18-electron rule and an ionic model where the carbonyl ligands form a salt with the alkaline earth metal. Computational methods of studying bonding interactions have produced varying results depending on the basis sets and reference states used.

=== Covalent bonding ===
In this model, bonding between a CO ligand and the metal center is described using the Dewar-Chatt-Duncanson model. The CO ligand binds to the metal through σ-donation, and the metal center engages in π back-donation with the carbonyl ligand. The alkaline earth octacarbonyl complexes contain a metal center with a formal oxidation state of zero. Quantum chemical calculations using density functional theory confirm that Ca, Sr, and Ba can indeed utilize their (n-1)d in bonding to satisfy the 18-electron rule. These computational results support the hypothesis that alkaline earth octacarbonyl complexes follow the 18-electron rule and are comparable to carbonyl transition metal complexes.

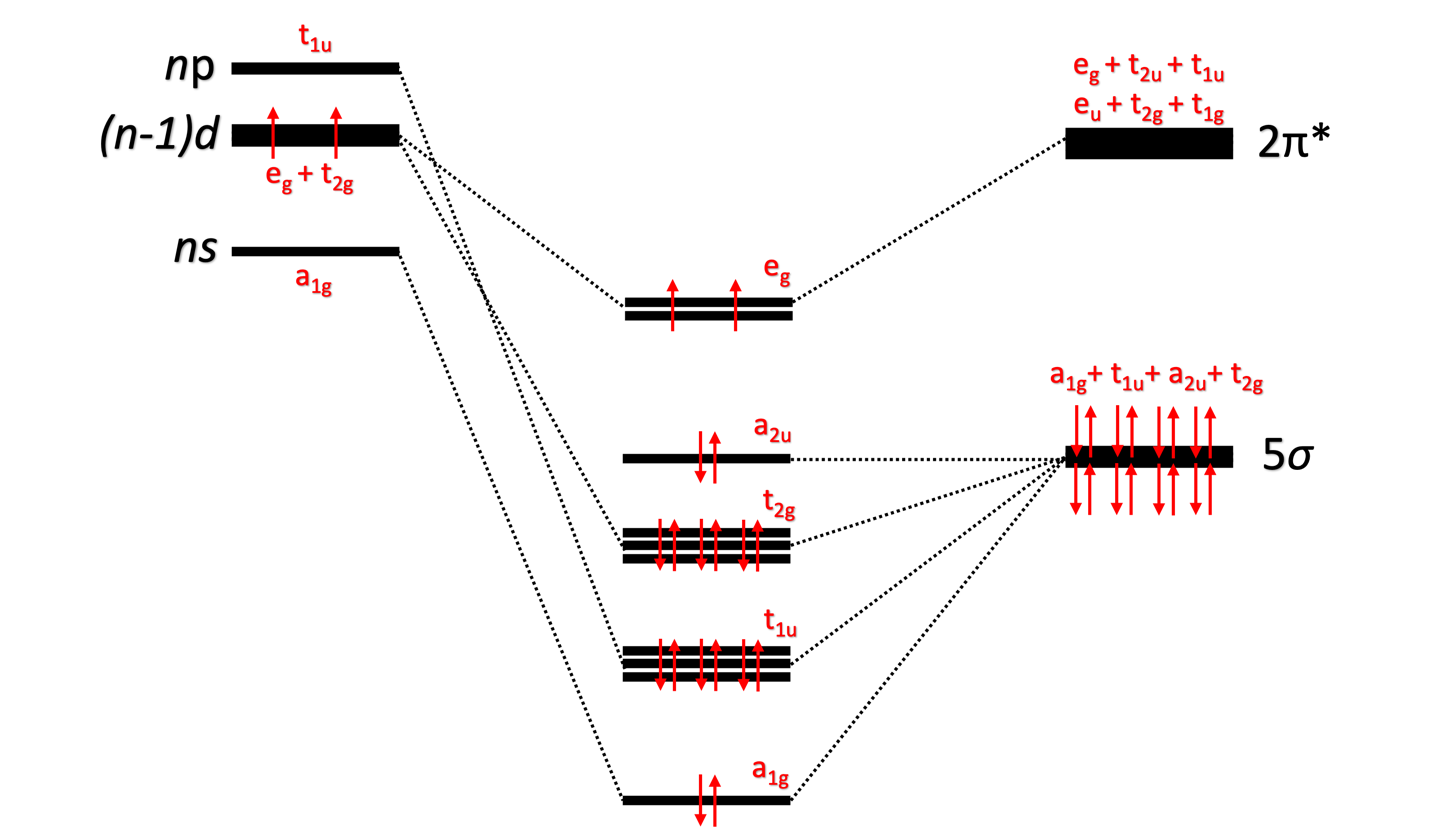
Valence molecular orbital diagram of a generic alkaline earth M(CO)_{8} complex. Only occupied valence orbitals are depicted. Metal atomic orbitals are shown on the left and eight ligand orbitals are shown on the right.

Computational methods such as QTAIM (Quantum Theory of Atoms in Molecules) and EDA-NOCV (Energy Decomposition Analysis- Natural Orbitals of Chemical Valence) analyses as well as simple electron counting support a complex that abides by the 18-electron rule. As depicted in the molecular orbital diagram above, the computed electronic structure contains a purely ligand-based orbital with a_{2u} symmetry. Invoking this ligand-only orbital allows for satisfaction of the 18-electron rule in M(CO)_{8} complexes, and is stabilized by the field effect of the metal on the ligand cage. Alkaline earth metals are capable of adding their two valence electrons to the degenerate (n-1)d orbitals of e_{g} symmetry. These electrons engage in strong π back-donation with the CO ligands and account for the red-shifted CO stretching frequency in the experimentally derived infrared spectra. The two electrons in the degenerate e_{g} orbitals both have the same spin and give a triplet electronic ground state, ^{3}A_{1g}. This model support seven σ-donation interactions (a_{1g} + 3t_{1u} + 3t_{2g}) and two π back-donation bonds (2e_{g}) to accommodate the 18-electron rule. QTAIM provides complete sets of bond critical points and bond paths that connect the M-CO bonds in straight lines with cubic octahedral symmetry. Straight lines produced by QTAIM computations are supportive evidence of covalent interactions. In M(CO)_{8}, there are eight covalent bonding interactions between a neutral alkaline earth center and eight CO ligands produced by QTAIM.

=== Ionic bonding ===
The results of quantum chemical calculations also suggest that the bonding in alkaline earth octacarbonyl complexes can be described in terms of ionic bonding between a metal center with a formal +2 oxidation state and a ligand cage with a formal charge of -2 giving the general formula: Ca^{2+}[(CO)_{8}]^{−2}. In this bonding model, the carbonyl-ligand anion cage ([(CO)_{8}]^{−2}) serves as a σ- and π-Lewis base and the metal center acts as a Lewis acid. Definitive proof of this bonding model would undermine the discovery of an alkaline earth complex that abides by the 18-electron rule.

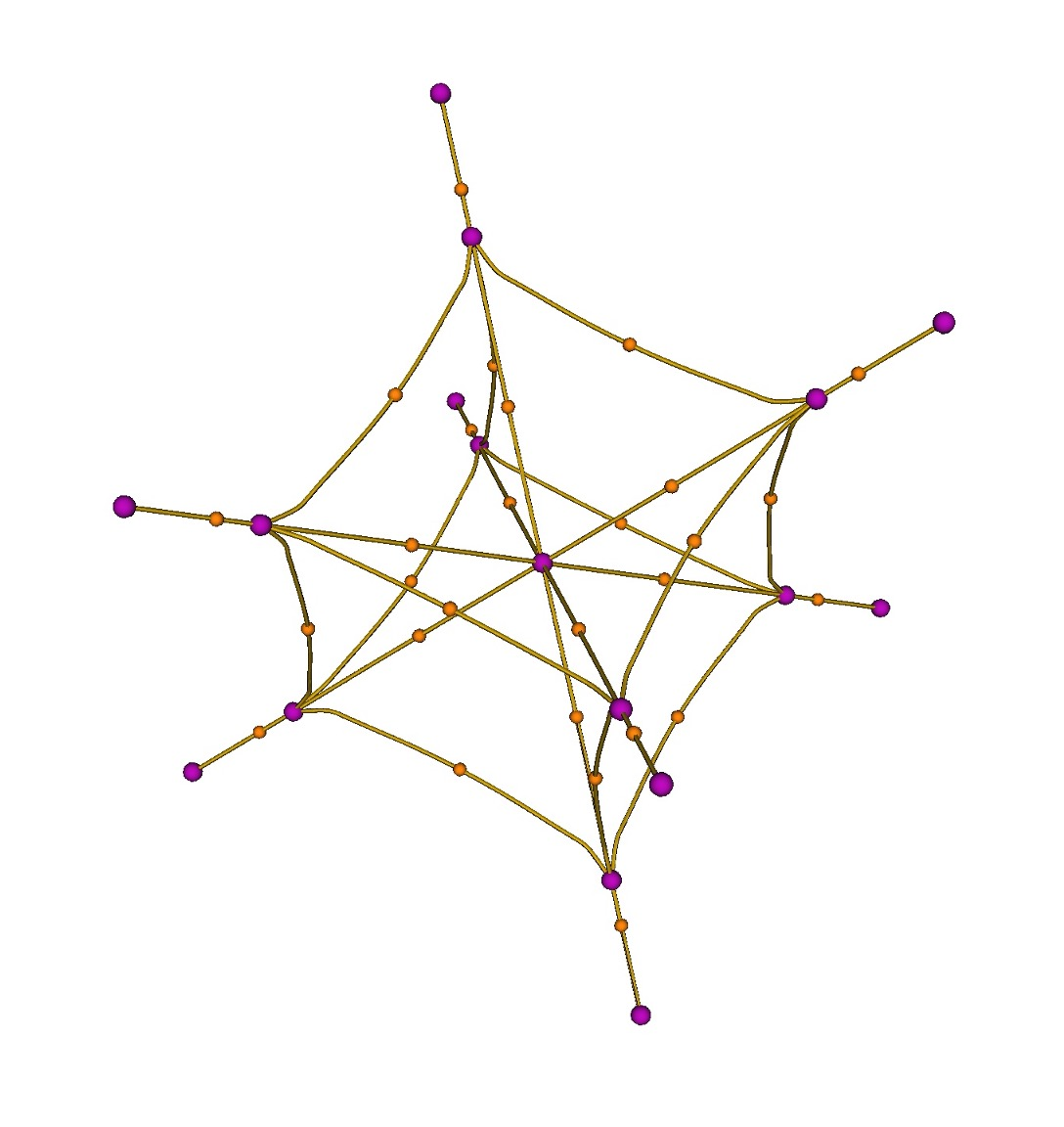
Molecular graph of Ca(CO)_{8} showing bond critical points (orange spheres) and bond paths

Calculations on the bond order, bond strength, and covalent/electrostatic character of the bonds using electron localization (ELF) analysis, source function (SF) calculations, and the interacting quantum atoms (IQA) approach, concluded that M-CO bonding interactions are predominantly electrostatic in nature. Covalency of the bond increases as the metal center is substituted from Ca to Sr to Ba. The bond order of all M-CO bonds were estimated to be below 1 with a low covalent contribution. In ELF calculations, there is no noticeable π back-donation contrary to the bonding interactions depicted in the Dewar-Chatt-Duncanson model. QTAIM, RDG (Reduced Density Gradient), and DORI (Density Overlap Regions Indicator) approaches also suggest the presence of noncovalent intermolecular forces between neighboring CO groups which may give rise to the experimentally observed red-shift of the CO stretching frequencies in the infrared spectra.

== Further studies ==
=== Jellium model ===
In the Jellium model, the electron density and the interaction between electrons and positive charges are assumed to be evenly distributed in space. This model is used to study metal clusters. Under this model, metal clusters treated as "giant atoms", and electron energy levels interacting with the spheroid charge distribution correspond to super shells where the resulting magic numbers are 2, 8,18, 20, 32, 40. The super shell configurations are depicted as capital letters (1S^{2}, 1P^{6}, 1D^{10}, 2S^{2}, 1F^{14}, 2P^{6}, etc.) to distinguish from the electronic shells of individual atoms.

A generic octacarbonyl complex adopts cubic O_{h} symmetry and can be viewed as a homogenous spherical field according to the Jellium model. Since full saturation of the occupied valence orbitals to form a closed shell species requires a total of 20 electrons, the magic number 20 is fulfilled. The resulting complex has the formula: [M(CO)_{8}]^{q} , where M is either a transition metal or alkaline earth metal and q is the charge of the ion. For all alkaline earth metals, q is -2. Since M(CO)_{8} complexes are not metal clusters, analogical comparison between a metal cluster previously studied under the Jellium model and M(CO)_{8} is required. The octa-coordinated metal cluster, [BaBe_{8}]^{2−} can be used with success. [BaBe_{8}]^{2−} has cubic O_{h} symmetry, contains eight coordinative bonds and two π* backdonation bonds, and contains a magic number of 20 electrons. Under the Jellium model, both complexes share similar results supporting that any theoretical ion [M(CO)_{8}] with 20 electrons can be successfully studied under the Jellium model as a superatom and analogous to a metal cluster.

In the covalent bonding model for octacarbonyl complexes, the a_{2u} level is a ligand-only orbital, i.e., it does not contribute to bonding (see above). Full population of the e_{g} orbital with an additional two electrons affords the 20 electron octacarbonyl complex ([M(CO)_{8}]^{−2}). Results from the Jellium model support that the a_{2u} orbital is a ligand-only orbital but contributes modestly in each coordinative M-CO bond. Transition metal octacarbonyl complexes with 20 electrons may also be studied under this model.

== Impact ==
The synthesis of alkaline earth octacarbonyl complexes has provided insight into unconventional bonding in compounds containing alkaline earth metals that are capable of utilizing their (n-1)d orbitals. Observation of these complexes has prompted the successful exploration of other octa-coordinated alkaline earth complexes such as the octa-coordinated dinitrogen derivative: M(N_{2})_{8}. Computational studies are frequently used when studying bonding interactions in nonclassical molecules such as these, and development of new and improved computational methods are required to adequately resolve the bonding interaction controversy. Though computational methods have produced varying results so far, research into other complexes with unique bonding characteristics has been assisted through the study of alkaline earth octacarbonyl complexes including ^{225}Ac-based radiopharmaceuticals and superoctahedral boranes.
