= Metal carbon dioxide complex =

Metal carbon dioxide complexes are coordination complexes that contain carbon dioxide ligands. Aside from the fundamental interest in the coordination chemistry of simple molecules, studies in this field are motivated by the possibility that transition metals might catalyze useful transformations of CO_{2}. This research is relevant both to organic synthesis and to the production of "solar fuels" that would avoid the use of petroleum-based fuels.

== Structural trends ==
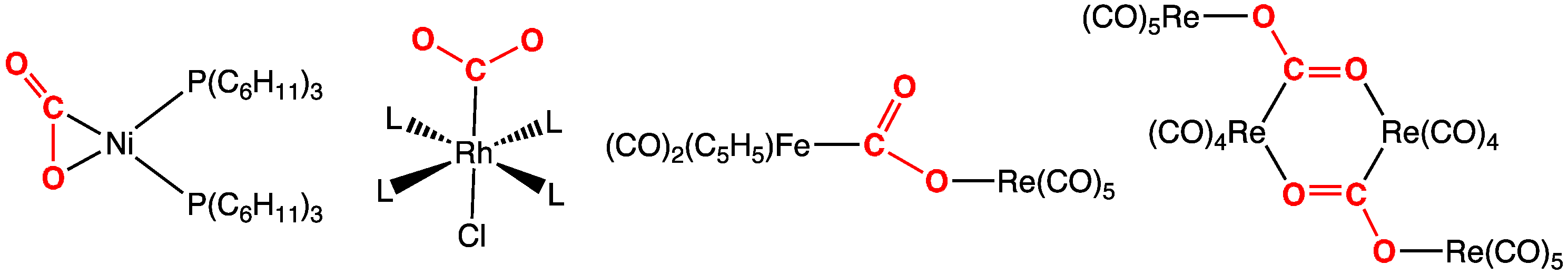
Illustrative structures of transition metal carbon dioxide complexes, from the left: Ni(η^{2}-CO_{2})(PCy_{3})_{2}, Rh(η^{1}-CO_{2})ClL_{4} (L_{4} = (diars)_{2}), the metallacarboxylic ester CpFe(CO)_{2}(η^{1}:η^{1}-CO_{2})Re(CO)_{5}, and another dimetalla-ester.

Carbon dioxide binds to metals in only a few ways. The bonding mode depends on the electrophilicity and basicity of the metal centre. Most common is the η^{2}-CO_{2} coordination mode as illustrated by Aresta's complex, Ni(CO_{2})(PCy_{3})_{2}, which was the first reported complex of CO_{2.} This square-planar compound is a derivative of Ni(II) with a reduced CO_{2} ligand. In rare cases, CO_{2} binds to metals as a Lewis base through its oxygen centres, but such adducts are weak and mainly of theoretical interest. A variety of multinuclear complexes are also known often involving Lewis basic and Lewis acidic metals, e.g. metallacarboxylate salts (C_{5}H_{5})Fe(CO)_{2}CO_{2}^{−}K^{+}. In multinuclear cases (compounds containing more than one metal), more complicated and more varied coordination geometries are observed. One example is the unsymmetrical compound containing four rhenium centres, [(CO)_{5}ReCO_{2}Re(CO)_{4}]_{2}. Carbon dioxide can also bind to ligands on a metal complex (vs just the metal), e.g. by converting hydroxy ligands to carbonato ligands.

== Reactions ==
Transition metal carbon dioxide complexes undergo a variety of reactions. Metallacarboxylic acids protonate at oxygen and eventually convert to metal carbonyl complexes:

[L_{n}MCO_{2}]^{−} + 2 H^{+} → [L_{n}MCO]^{+} + H_{2}O

This reaction is relevant to the potential catalytic conversion of CO_{2} to fuels.

== Carbonation of metal-carbon bonds ==
=== Insertion into Cu-C bonds ===
N-heterocyclic carbene (NHC) supported Cu^{I} complexes catalyze carboxylation of organoboronic esters. The catalyst forms in situ from CuCl, an NHC ligand, and KO^{t}Bu. Copper tert-butoxide can transmetallate with the organoboronic ester to generate the Cu^{I}-C bond, which intermediate can insert into CO_{2} smoothly to get the respective carboxylate. Salt metathesis with KO^{t}Bu releases product and regenerates catalyst (Scheme 2).

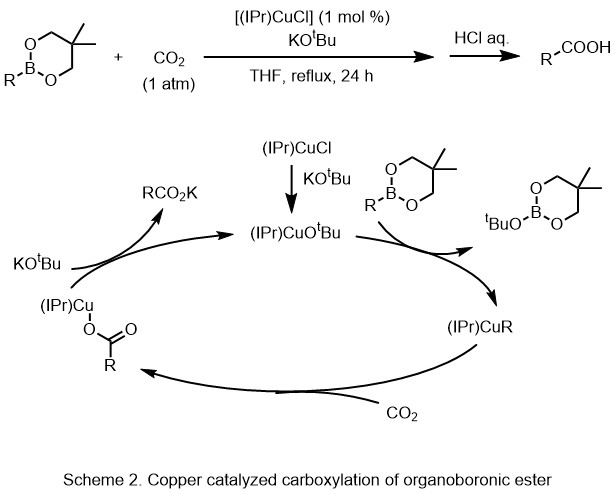
Scheme 2 Copper catalyzed carboxylation of organoboronic ester

Apart from transmetallation, there are other approaches forming Cu-C bond. C-H functionalization is a straightforward and atom economic method. Base can help deprotonate acidic C-H protons and form Cu-C bond. [(Phenanthroline)Cu(PR_{3})] catalyst effect C-H carboxylation on terminal alkynes together with Cs_{2}CO_{3}. NHC-Cu-H species to deprotonate acidic proton to effect carboxylation of terminal alkynes. Cu-H species were generated from Cu-F and organosilanes. The carboxylate product was trapped by silyl fluoride to get silyl ether. For non-acidic C-H bonds, directed metalation with ^{i}Bu_{3}Al(TMP)Li is adopted followed by transmetallation with copper to get Cu-C bond. Allylic C-H bonds and phenyl C-H bonds got carboxylated with this approach by Hou and co-workers:

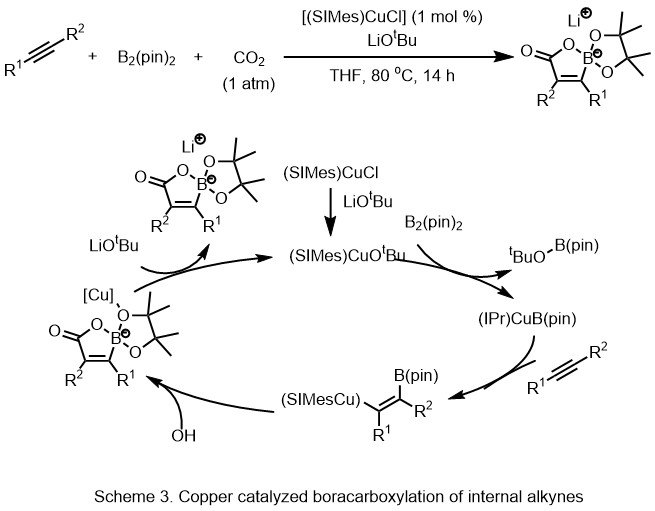
Scheme 3 Copper catalysed boracarboxylation of internal alkynes

Carbometallation to alkynes and allenes using organozinc and organoaluminum reagents followed by transmetallation to copper is also a strategy to initiate carboxylation. Trimethylaluminium is able to insert into unbiased aliphatic internal alkynes with syn fashion directed by ether directing group. Vinyl copper complexes are formed by transmetallation and carboxylation is realized with a similar pathway giving tetrasubstituted aliphatic vinyl carboxylic acids. In this case, regioslectivity is controlled by the favor of six-membered aluminum ring formation. Furthermore, carboxylation can be achieved on ynamides and allenamides using less reactive dimethyl zinc via similar approach.

=== Insertion in Pd-C bonds ===
In the presence of palladium acetate under 1-30 bar of CO_{2}, simple aromatic compounds convert to aromatic carboxylic acids. A PSiP-pincer ligand (5) promotes carboxylation of allene without using pre-functionalized substrates. Catalyst regeneration, Et_{3}Al was added to do transmetallation with palladium. Catalyst is regenerated by the following β-H elimination. Apart from terminal allenes, some of internal allenes are also tolerated in this reaction, generating allyl carboxylic acid with the yield between 54% and 95%. This system was also applied to 1,3-diene, generating carboxylic acid in 1,2 addition fashion. In 2015, Iwasawa et al. reported the germanium analogue (6) and combined CO_{2} source together with hydride source to formate salts.

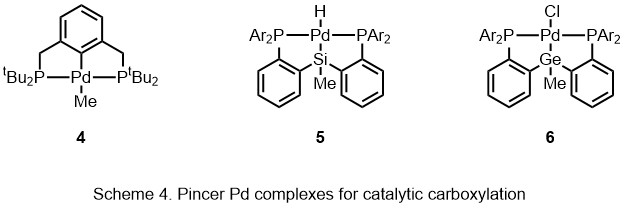
Scheme 4 Pincer Pd complexes for catalytic carboxylation

Palladium has shown huge power to catalyze C-H functionalization. If the Pd-C intermediate in carboxylation reaction comes from C-H activation, such methodology must promote metal catalyzed carboxylation to a much higher level in utility. Iwasawa and co-workers reported direct carboxylation by styrenyl C-H activation generating coumarin derivatives. Benzene rings with different electronic properties and some heteroaromatic rings are tolerated in this reaction with yield from 50% to 90%. C-H activation was demonstrated by crystallography study.

=== Insertion by Rh-C bonds ===
Similar to Cu(I) chemistry mentioned above, Rh(I) complexes can also transmetallate with arylboronic esters to get aryl rhodium intermediates, to which CO_{2} is inserted giving carboxylic acids. Later, Iwasawa et al. described C-H carboxylation strategy. Rh(I) undergoes oxidative addition to aryl C-H bond followed by transmetallation with alkyl aluminum species. Ar-Rh(I) regenerates by reductive elimination releasing methane. Ar-Rh(I) attacks CO_{2} then transmetallates with aryl boronic acid to release the boronic acid of product, giving final carboxylic acid by hydrolysis. Directed and non-directed versions are both achieved.

Iwasawa and co-workers developed Rh(I) catalyzed carbonation reaction initiated by Rh-H insertion to vinylarenes. In order to regenerate reactive Rh-H after nucleophilic addition to CO_{2}, photocatalytic proton-coupled electron transfer approach was adopted. In this system, excess amount of diethylpropylethylamine works as sacrificial electron donor (Scheme 5).

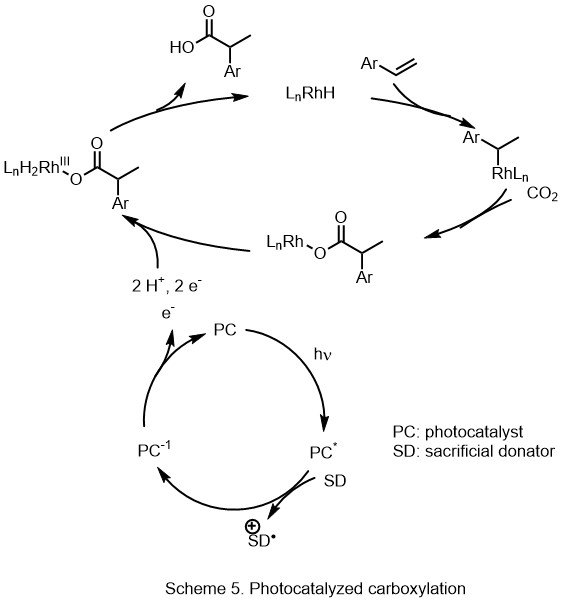
Photocatalyzed carboxylation

=== Insertion by Ni-C bond ===
Carboxylation of benzyl halides has been reported. The reaction mechanism is proposed to involve oxidative addition of benzyl chloride to Ni(0). The Ni(II) benzyl complex is reduced to Ni(I), e.g., by zinc, which inserts CO_{2} delivering the nickel carboxylate. Reduction of the Ni(I) carboxylate to Ni(0) releases the zinc carboxylate (Scheme 6). Similarly, such carboxylation has been achieved on aryl and benzyl pivalate, alkyl halides, and allyl esters.

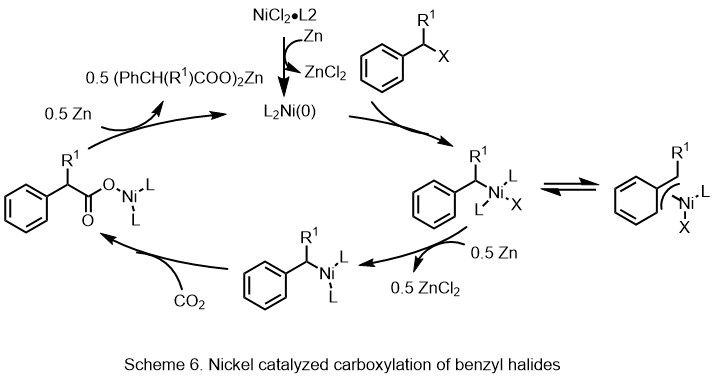
Scheme 6 Nickel catalysed carboxylation of benzyl halides
