= Metal carbonyl =

Coordination complexes of transition metals and metal ions with carbon monoxide ligands

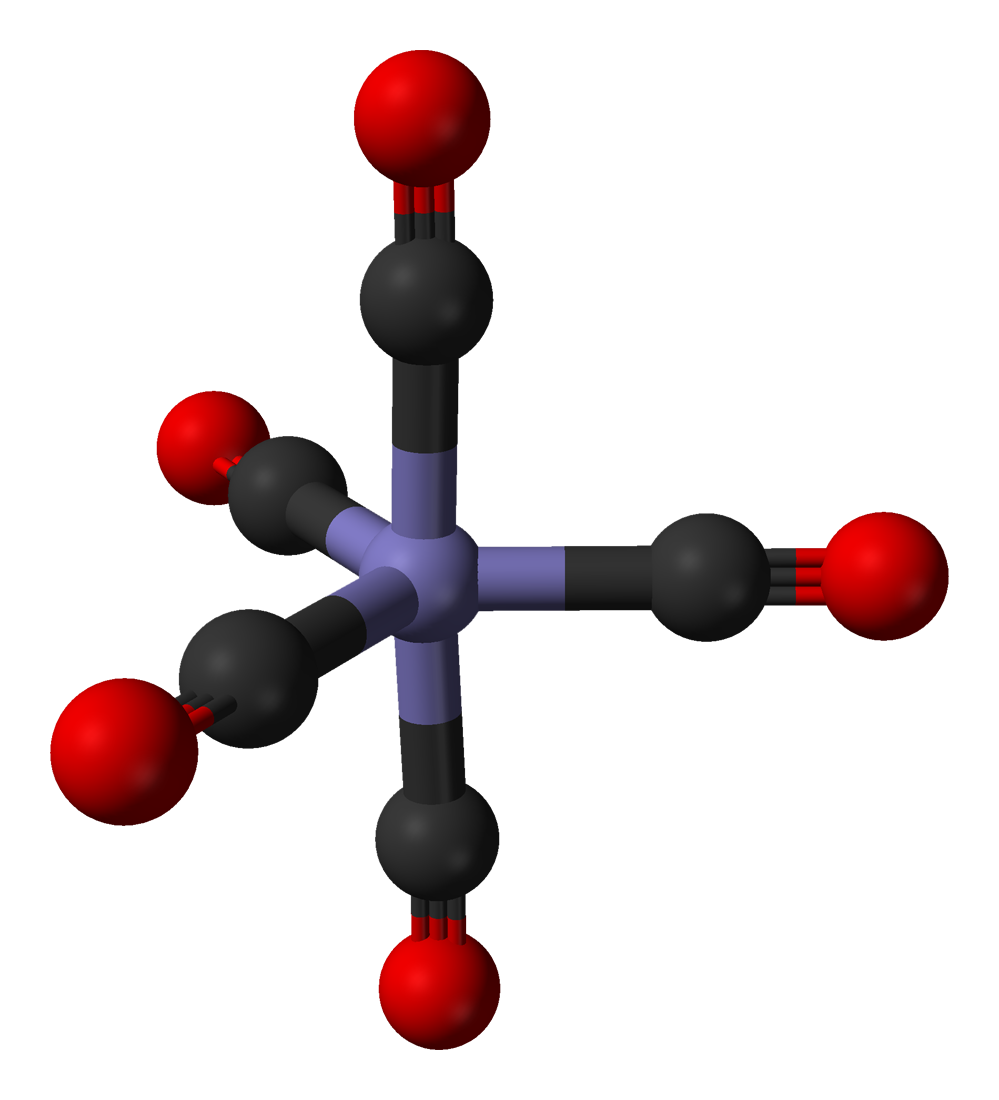
Iron pentacarbonyl: an iron atom with five CO ligands

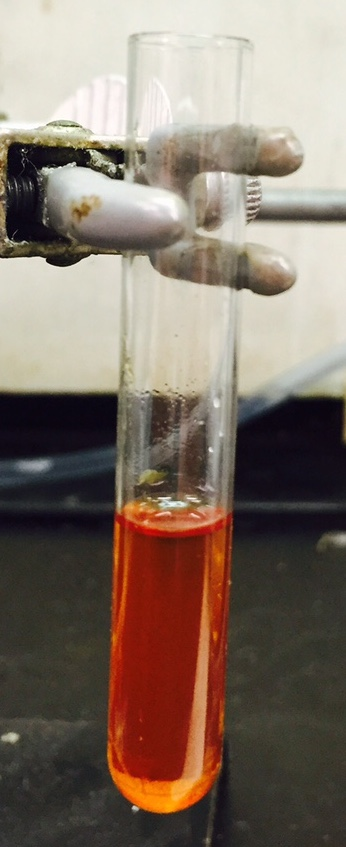
Sample of iron pentacarbonyl, an air-stable liquid.

Metal carbonyls are coordination complexes of transition metals with carbon monoxide ligands. Metal carbonyls are useful in organic synthesis and as catalysts or catalyst precursors in homogeneous catalysis, such as hydroformylation and Reppe chemistry. In the Mond process, nickel tetracarbonyl is used to produce pure nickel. In organometallic chemistry, metal carbonyls serve as precursors for the preparation of other organometallic complexes.

Metal carbonyls are toxic by skin contact, inhalation or ingestion, in part because of their ability to carbonylate hemoglobin to give carboxyhemoglobin, which prevents the binding of oxygen.

== Nomenclature and terminology ==
The nomenclature of the metal carbonyls depends on the charge of the complex, the number and type of central atoms, and the number and type of ligands and their binding modes. They occur as neutral complexes, as positively-charged metal carbonyl cations or as negatively charged metal carbonylates. The carbon monoxide ligand may be bound terminally to a single metal atom or bridging to two or more metal atoms. These complexes may be homoleptic, containing only CO ligands, such as nickel tetracarbonyl (Ni(CO)_{4}), but more commonly metal carbonyls are heteroleptic and contain a mixture of ligands.

Mononuclear metal carbonyls contain only one metal atom as the central atom. Except vanadium hexacarbonyl, only metals with even atomic number, such as chromium, iron, nickel, and their homologs, build neutral mononuclear complexes. Polynuclear metal carbonyls are formed from metals with odd atomic numbers and contain a metal–metal bond. Complexes with different metals but only one type of ligand are called isoleptic.

Carbon monoxide has distinct binding modes in metal carbonyls. They differ in terms of their hapticity, denoted η, and their bridging mode. In η^{2}-CO complexes, both the carbon and oxygen are bonded to the metal. More commonly only carbon is bonded, in which case the hapticity is not mentioned.

The carbonyl ligand engages in a wide range of bonding modes in metal carbonyl dimers and clusters. In the most common bridging mode, denoted μ_{2} or simply μ, the CO ligand bridges a pair of metals. This bonding mode is observed in the commonly available metal carbonyls: Co_{2}(CO)_{8}, Fe_{2}(CO)_{9}, Fe_{3}(CO)_{12}, and Co_{4}(CO)_{12}. In certain higher nuclearity clusters, CO bridges between three or even four metals. These ligands are denoted μ_{3}-CO and μ_{4}-CO. Less common are bonding modes in which both C and O bond to the metal, such as μ_{3}η^{2}.

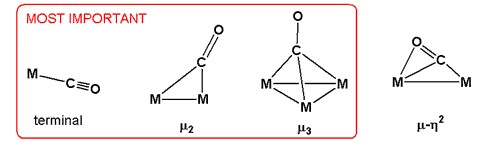

== Structure and bonding ==
The highest occupied molecular orbital (HOMO) of CO is a σ MO

Energy level scheme of the σ and π orbitals of carbon monoxide

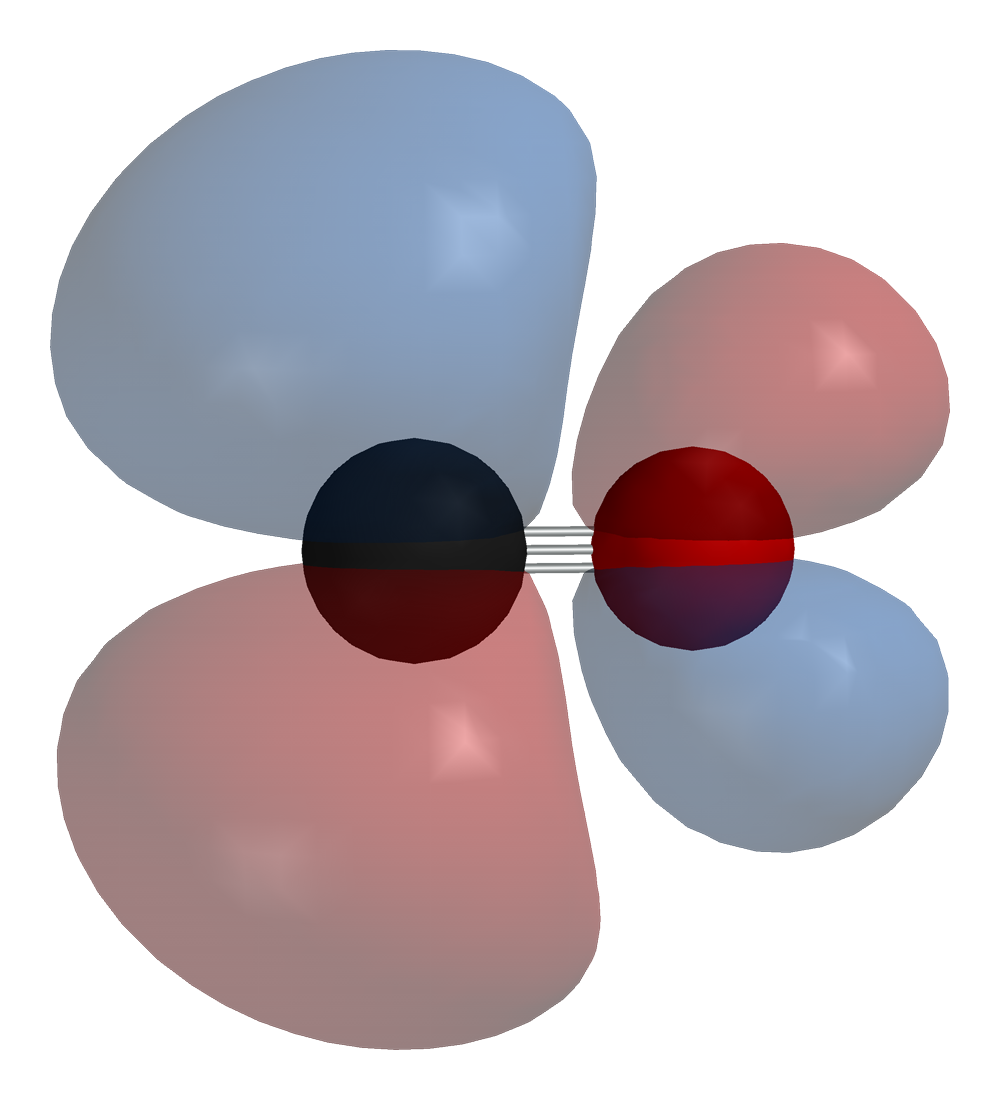
The lowest unoccupied molecular orbital (LUMO) of CO is a π* antibonding MO

Diagram showing synergic π backbonding in transition metal carbonyls

Carbon monoxide bonds to transition metals using "synergistic pi* back-bonding". The M–C bonding has three components, giving rise to a partial triple bond. A sigma (σ) bond arises from overlap of the nonbonding (or weakly anti-bonding) sp-hybridized electron pair on carbon with a blend of d-, s-, and p-orbitals on the metal. A pair of pi (π) bonds arises from overlap of filled d-orbitals on the metal with a pair of π*-antibonding orbitals projecting from the carbon atom of the CO. The latter kind of binding requires that the metal have d-electrons, and that the metal be in a relatively low oxidation state (0 or +1) which makes the back-donation of electron density favorable. As electrons from the metal fill the π-antibonding orbital of CO, they weaken the carbon–oxygen bond compared with free carbon monoxide, while the metal–carbon bond is strengthened. Because of the multiple bond character of the M–CO linkage, the distance between the metal and carbon atom is relatively short, often less than 1.8 Å, about 0.2 Å shorter than a metal–alkyl bond. The M-CO and MC-O distance are sensitive to other ligands on the metal. Illustrative of these effects are the following data for Mo-C and C-O distances in Mo(CO)_{6} and Mo(CO)_{3}(4-methylpyridine)_{3}: 2.06 vs 1.90 and 1.11 vs 1.18 Å.

$\ce{M^{-}-C{\equiv}O+ <-> M=C=O <-> M+{\equiv}C-O^-}$
Resonance structures of a metal carbonyl. From left to right, the contributions of the right-hand-side canonical forms increase as the back-bonding power of M to CO increases.

Infrared spectroscopy is a sensitive probe for the presence of bridging carbonyl ligands. For compounds with doubly bridging CO ligands, denoted μ_{2}-CO or often just μ-CO, the bond stretching frequency ν_{CO} is usually shifted by 100–200 cm^{−1} to lower energy compared to the signatures of terminal CO, which are in the region 1800 cm^{−1}. Bands for face-capping (μ_{3}) CO ligands appear at even lower energies. In addition to symmetrical bridging modes, CO can be found to bridge asymmetrically or through donation from a metal d orbital to the π* orbital of CO. The increased π-bonding due to back-donation from multiple metal centers results in further weakening of the C–O bond.

=== Physical characteristics ===
Most mononuclear carbonyl complexes are colorless or pale yellow, volatile liquids or solids that are flammable and toxic. Vanadium hexacarbonyl, a uniquely stable 17-electron metal carbonyl, is a blue-black solid. Dimetallic and polymetallic carbonyls tend to be more deeply colored. Triiron dodecacarbonyl (Fe_{3}(CO)_{12}) forms deep green crystals. The crystalline metal carbonyls often are sublimable in vacuum, although this process is often accompanied by degradation. Metal carbonyls are soluble in nonpolar and polar organic solvents such as benzene, diethyl ether, acetone, glacial acetic acid, and carbon tetrachloride. Some salts of cationic and anionic metal carbonyls are soluble in water or lower alcohols.

== Analytical characterization ==
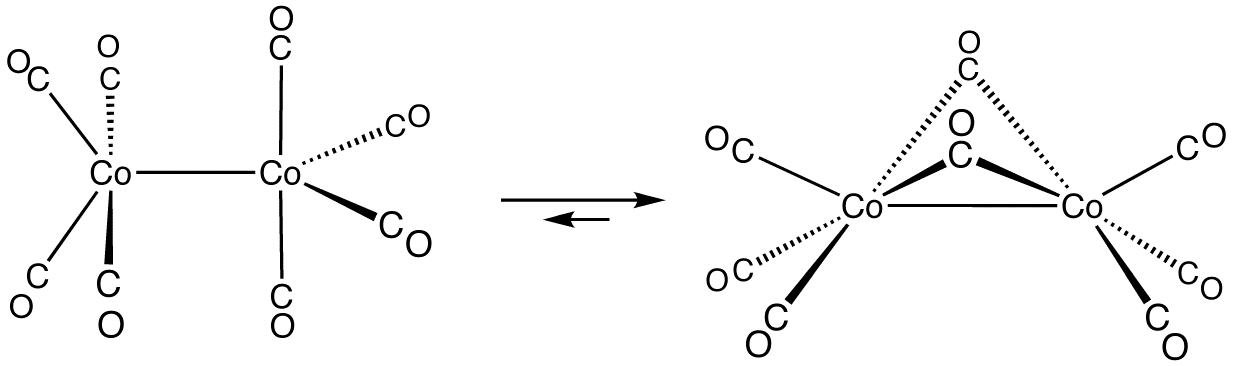
Isomers of dicobalt octacarbonyl

Apart from X-ray crystallography, important analytical techniques for the characterization of metal carbonyls are infrared spectroscopy and ^{13}C NMR spectroscopy. These two techniques provide structural information on two very different time scales. Infrared-active vibrational modes, such as CO-stretching vibrations, are often fast compared to intramolecular processes, whereas NMR transitions occur at lower frequencies and thus sample structures on a time scale that, it turns out, is comparable to the rate of intramolecular ligand exchange processes. NMR data provide information on "time-averaged structures", whereas IR is an instant "snapshot". Illustrative of the differing time scales, investigation of dicobalt octacarbonyl (Co_{2}(CO)_{8}) by means of infrared spectroscopy provides 13 ν_{CO} bands, far more than expected for a single compound. This complexity reflects the presence of isomers with and without bridging CO ligands. The ^{13}C NMR spectrum of the same substance exhibits only a single signal at a chemical shift of 204 ppm. This simplicity indicates that the isomers quickly (on the NMR timescale) interconvert.

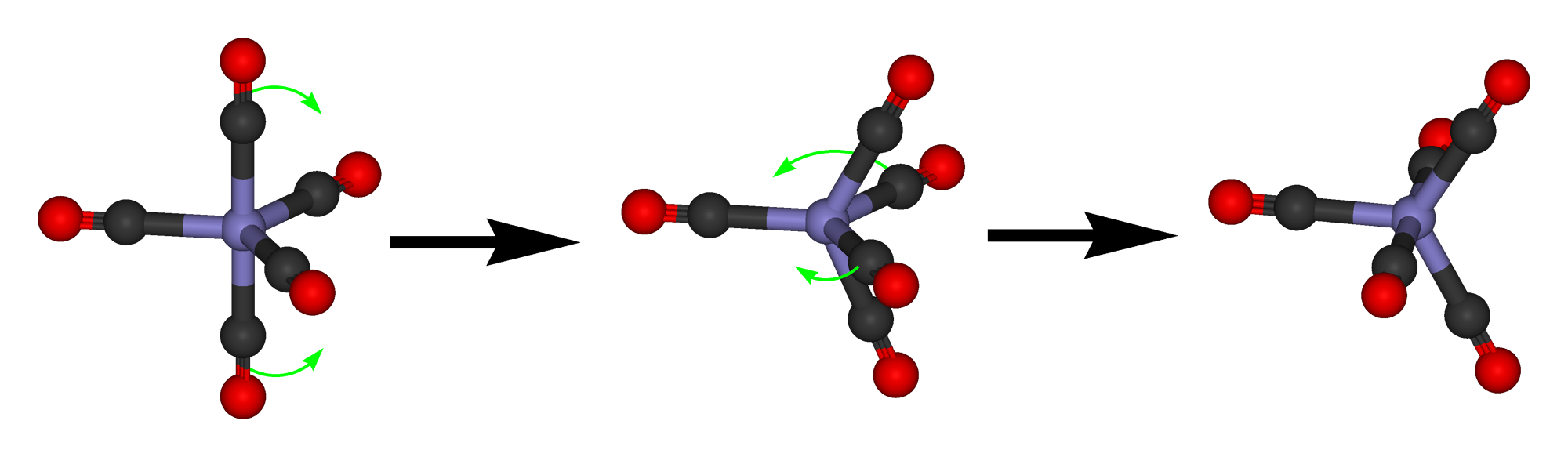
The Berry pseudorotation mechanism for iron pentacarbonyl

Iron pentacarbonyl exhibits only a single ^{13}C NMR signal owing to rapid exchange of the axial and equatorial CO ligands by Berry pseudorotation.

=== Infrared spectra ===
The number of infrared-active vibrational modes of several prototypical metal carbonyl complexes.

An important technique for characterizing metal carbonyls is infrared spectroscopy. The C–O vibration, typically denoted ν_{CO}, occurs at 2143 cm^{−1} for carbon monoxide gas. The energies of the ν_{CO} band for the metal carbonyls correlates with the strength of the carbon–oxygen bond, and inversely correlated with the strength of the π-backbonding between the metal and the carbon. The π-basicity of the metal center depends on a lot of factors; in the isoelectronic series (titanium to iron) at the bottom of this section, the hexacarbonyls show decreasing π-backbonding as one increases (makes more positive) the charge on the metal. π-Basic ligands increase π-electron density at the metal, and improved backbonding reduces ν_{CO}. The Tolman electronic parameter uses the Ni(CO)_{3} fragment to order ligands by their π-donating abilities.

The number of vibrational modes of a metal carbonyl complex can be determined by group theory. Only vibrational modes that transform as the electric dipole operator will have nonzero direct products and are observed. The number of observable IR transitions (but not their energies) can thus be predicted. For example, the CO ligands of octahedral complexes, such as Cr(CO)_{6}, transform as a_{1g}, e_{g}, and t_{1u}, but only the t_{1u} mode (antisymmetric stretch of the apical carbonyl ligands) is IR-allowed. Thus, only a single ν_{CO} band is observed in the IR spectra of the octahedral metal hexacarbonyls. Spectra for complexes of lower symmetry are more complex. For example, the IR spectrum of Fe_{2}(CO)_{9} displays CO bands at 2082, 2019 and 1829 cm^{−1}. The number of IR-observable vibrational modes for some metal carbonyls are shown in the table. Exhaustive tabulations are available. These rules apply to metal carbonyls in solution or the gas phase. Low-polarity solvents are ideal for high resolution. For measurements on solid samples of metal carbonyls, the number of bands can increase owing in part to site symmetry.

| Compound | ν_{CO} (cm^{−1}) | ^{13}C NMR shift (ppm) | average M-CO distance (pm) | average C-O distance (pm) |
|---|---|---|---|---|
| CO | 2143 | 181 | | |
| Ti(CO)^{2−}_{6} | 1748 | 245 | 204 | 116 |
| V(CO)^{−}_{6} | 1859 | (paramagnetic) | 200, 193 (PPN^{+} salt) | 113 |
| Cr(CO)_{6} | 2000 | 212 | 191 | 114 |
| Mn(CO)^{+}_{6} | 2100 | | | |
| Fe(CO)^{2+}_{6} | 2204 | | 191 | 112 (BF_{4}^{−} salt) |
| Fe(CO)_{5} | 2022, 2000 | 209 | 180 | 112 |
| Ru(CO)_{5} | 2038, 2002 | | | |
| Ni(CO)_{4} | | | 181 | 113 |

| Carbonyl | ν_{CO}, μ_{1} (cm^{−1}) | ν_{CO}, μ_{2} (cm^{−1}) | ν_{CO}, μ_{3} (cm^{−1}) |
|---|---|---|---|
| Rh_{2}(CO)_{8} | 2060, 2084 | 1846, 1862 | |
| Rh_{4}(CO)_{12} | 2044, 2070, 2074 | 1886 | |
| Rh_{6}(CO)_{16} | 2045, 2075 | | 1819 |

=== Nuclear magnetic resonance spectroscopy ===
Metal carbonyls are often characterized by ^{13}C NMR spectroscopy. To improve the sensitivity of this technique, complexes are often enriched with ^{13}CO. Typical chemical shift range for terminally bound ligands is 150 to 220 ppm. Bridging ligands resonate between 230 and 280 ppm. The ^{13}C signals shift toward higher fields with an increasing atomic number of the central metal.

NMR spectroscopy can be used for experimental determination of the fluxionality.

The activation energy of ligand exchange processes can be determined by the temperature dependence of the line broadening.

=== Mass spectrometry ===
Mass spectrometry provides information about the structure and composition of the complexes. Spectra for metal polycarbonyls are often easily interpretable, because the dominant fragmentation process is the loss of carbonyl ligands (m/z = 28).

M(CO)^{+}_{n} → M(CO)^{+}_{n−1} + CO

Electron ionization is the most common technique for characterizing the neutral metal carbonyls. Neutral metal carbonyls can be converted to charged species by derivatization, which enables the use of electrospray ionization (ESI), instrumentation for which is often widely available. For example, treatment of a metal carbonyl with alkoxide generates an anionic metallaformate that is amenable to analysis by ESI-MS:

L_{n}M(CO) + RO^{−} → [L_{n}M−C(=O)OR]^{−}

Some metal carbonyls react with azide to give isocyanato complexes with release of nitrogen. By adjusting the cone voltage or temperature, the degree of fragmentation can be controlled. The molar mass of the parent complex can be determined, as well as information about structural rearrangements involving loss of carbonyl ligands under ESI-MS conditions.

Mass spectrometry combined with infrared photodissociation spectroscopy can provide vibrational informations for ionic carbonyl complexes in gas phase.

== Occurrence in nature ==
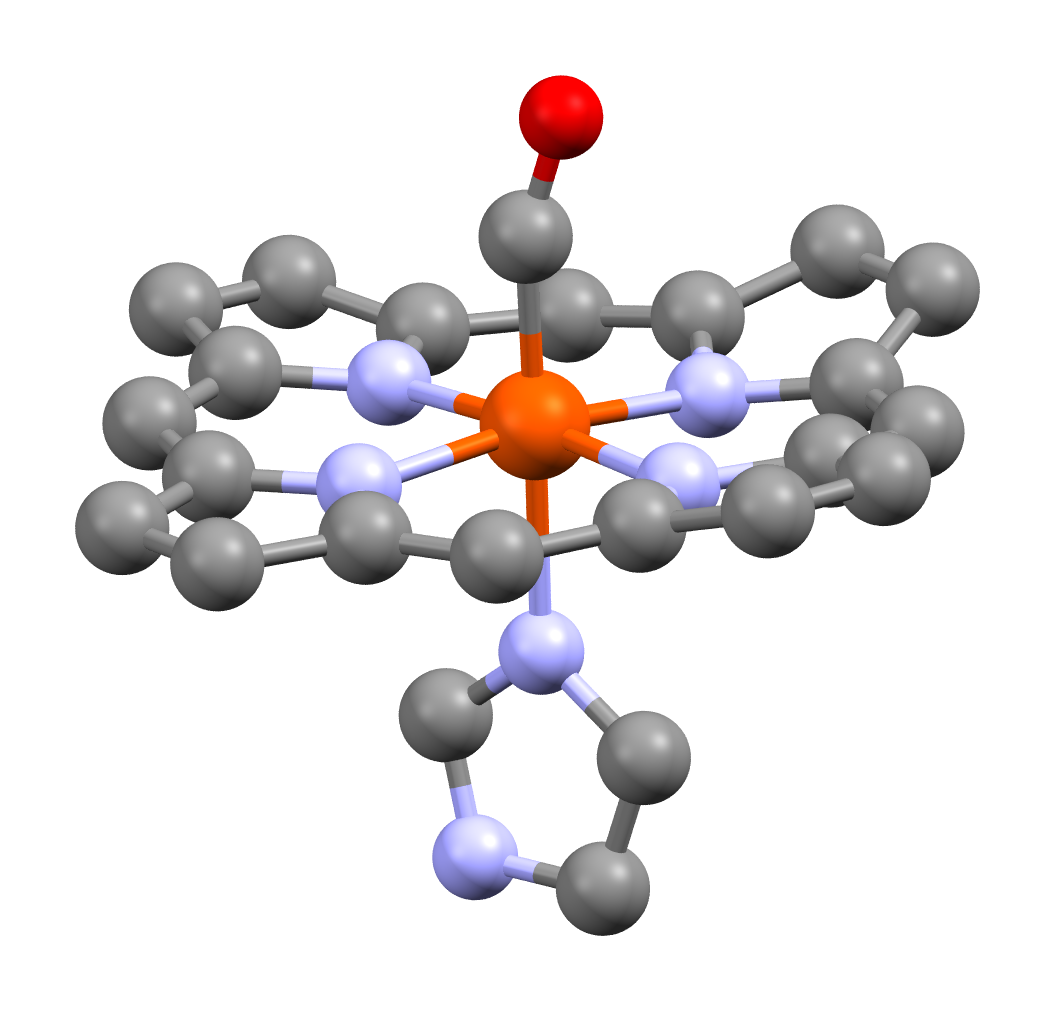
A heme unit of human carboxyhemoglobin, showing the carbonyl ligand at the apical position, trans to the histidine residue.

In the investigation of the infrared spectrum of the Galactic Center of the Milky Way, monoxide vibrations of iron carbonyls in interstellar dust clouds were detected. Iron carbonyl clusters were also observed in Jiange H5 chondrites identified by infrared spectroscopy. Four infrared stretching frequencies were found for the terminal and bridging carbon monoxide ligands.

In the oxygen-rich atmosphere of the Earth, metal carbonyls are subject to oxidation to the metal oxides. It is discussed whether in the reducing hydrothermal environments of the prebiotic prehistory such complexes were formed and could have been available as catalysts for the synthesis of critical biochemical compounds such as pyruvic acid. Traces of the carbonyls of iron, nickel, and tungsten were found in the gaseous emanations from the sewage sludge of municipal treatment plants.

The hydrogenase enzymes contain CO bound to iron. It is thought that the CO stabilizes low oxidation states, which facilitates the binding of hydrogen. The enzymes carbon monoxide dehydrogenase and acetyl-CoA synthase also are involved in bioprocessing of CO. Carbon monoxide containing complexes are invoked for the toxicity of CO and signaling.

== Synthesis ==
The synthesis of metal carbonyls is a widely studied subject of organometallic research. Since the work of Mond and then Hieber, many procedures have been developed for the preparation of mononuclear metal carbonyls as well as homo- and heterometallic carbonyl clusters.

=== Direct reaction of metal with carbon monoxide ===
Nickel tetracarbonyl and iron pentacarbonyl can be prepared according to the following equations by reaction of finely divided metal with carbon monoxide:

Ni + 4 CO → Ni(CO)_{4} (1 bar, 55 °C)
Fe + 5 CO → Fe(CO)_{5} (100 bar, 175 °C)

Nickel tetracarbonyl is formed with carbon monoxide already at 80 °C and atmospheric pressure, finely divided iron reacts at temperatures between 150 and 200 °C and a carbon monoxide pressure of 50–200 bar. Other metal carbonyls are prepared by less direct methods.

=== Reduction of metal salts and oxides ===
Many metal carbonyls are prepared by reductive carbonylation. This method entails the reduction of metal halides in the presence of carbon monoxide, often at high pressures. A variety of reducing agents are employed, including copper, aluminum, hydrogen, as well as metal alkyls such as triethylaluminium. Illustrative is the formation of chromium hexacarbonyl from anhydrous chromium(III) chloride in benzene with aluminum as a reducing agent, and aluminum chloride as the catalyst:

CrCl_{3} + Al + 6 CO → Cr(CO)_{6} + AlCl_{3}

The use of metal alkyls, such as triethylaluminium and diethylzinc, as the reducing agent leads to the oxidative coupling of the alkyl radical to form the dimer alkane:

WCl_{6} + 6 CO + 2 Al(C_{2}H_{5})_{3} → W(CO)_{6} + 2 AlCl_{3} + 3 C_{4}H_{10}

Tungsten, molybdenum, manganese, and rhodium salts may be reduced with lithium aluminium hydride. Vanadium hexacarbonyl is prepared with sodium as a reducing agent in chelating solvents such as diglyme.

VCl_{3} + 4 Na + 6 CO + 2 diglyme → Na(diglyme)_{2}[V(CO)_{6}] + 3 NaCl
[V(CO)_{6}]^{−} + H^{+} → H[V(CO)_{6}] → 1/2 H_{2} + V(CO)_{6}

In the aqueous phase, nickel or cobalt salts can be reduced, for example by sodium dithionite. In the presence of carbon monoxide, cobalt salts are quantitatively converted to the tetracarbonylcobalt(−1) anion:

Co^{2+} + 3/2 S_{2}O^{2−}_{4} + 6 OH^{−} + 4 CO → Co(CO)^{−}_{4} + 3 SO^{2−}_{3} + 3 H_{2}O

Some metal carbonyls are prepared using CO directly as the reducing agent. In this way, Hieber and Fuchs first prepared dirhenium decacarbonyl from the oxide:

Re_{2}O_{7} + 17 CO → Re_{2}(CO)_{10} + 7 CO_{2}

If metal oxides are used carbon dioxide is formed as a reaction product. In the reduction of metal chlorides with carbon monoxide phosgene is formed, as in the preparation of osmium carbonyl chloride from the chloride salts. Carbon monoxide is also suitable for the reduction of sulfides, where carbonyl sulfide is the byproduct.

=== Photolysis and thermolysis ===
Photolysis or thermolysis of mononuclear carbonyls generates di- and polymetallic carbonyls such as diiron nonacarbonyl (Fe_{2}(CO)_{9}). On further heating, the products decompose eventually into the metal and carbon monoxide.

2 Fe(CO)_{5} → Fe_{2}(CO)_{9} + CO

The thermal decomposition of triosmium dodecacarbonyl (Os_{3}(CO)_{12}) provides higher-nuclear osmium carbonyl clusters such as Os_{4}(CO)_{13}, Os_{6}(CO)_{18} up to Os_{8}(CO)_{23}.

Mixed ligand carbonyls of ruthenium, osmium, rhodium, and iridium are often generated by abstraction of CO from solvents such as dimethylformamide (DMF) and 2-methoxyethanol. Typical is the synthesis of IrCl(CO)(PPh_{3})_{2} from the reaction of iridium(III) chloride and triphenylphosphine in boiling DMF solution.

=== Salt metathesis ===
Salt metathesis reaction of salts such as KCo(CO)_{4} with [Ru(CO)_{3}Cl_{2}]_{2} leads selectively to mixed-metal carbonyls such as RuCo_{2}(CO)_{11}.

4 KCo(CO)_{4} + [Ru(CO)_{3}Cl_{2}]_{2} → 2 RuCo_{2}(CO)_{11} + 4 KCl + 11 CO

=== Cations and carbonylates ===
The synthesis of ionic carbonyl complexes is possible by oxidation or reduction of the neutral complexes. Anionic metal carbonylates can be obtained for example by reduction of dinuclear complexes with sodium. A familiar example is the sodium salt of iron tetracarbonylate (Na_{2}Fe(CO)_{4}, Collman's reagent), which is used in organic synthesis.

The cationic hexacarbonyl salts of manganese, technetium and rhenium can be prepared from the carbonyl halides under carbon monoxide pressure by reaction with a Lewis acid.

Mn(CO)_{5}Cl + AlCl_{3} + CO → [Mn(CO)^{+}_{6}][AlCl^{−}_{4}]

The use of strong acids succeeded in preparing gold carbonyl cations such as [Au(CO)_{2}]^{+}, which is used as a catalyst for the carbonylation of alkenes. The cationic platinum carbonyl complex [Pt(CO)_{4}]^{2+} can be prepared by working in so-called superacids such as antimony pentafluoride. Although CO is considered generally as a ligand for low-valent metal ions, the tetravalent iron complex [Cp*_{2}Fe]^{2+} (16-valence electron complex) quantitatively binds CO to give the diamagnetic Fe(IV)-carbonyl [Cp*_{2}FeCO]^{2+} (18-valence electron complex).

== Reactions ==
Metal carbonyls are important precursors for the synthesis of other organometallic complexes. Common reactions are the substitution of carbon monoxide by other ligands, the oxidation or reduction reactions of the metal center, and reactions at the carbon monoxide ligand.

=== CO substitution ===
The substitution of CO ligands can be induced thermally or photochemically by donor ligands. The range of ligands is large, and includes phosphines, cyanide (CN^{−}), nitrogen donors, and even ethers, especially chelating ones. Alkenes, especially dienes, are effective ligands that afford synthetically useful derivatives. Substitution of 18-electron complexes generally follows a dissociative mechanism, involving 16-electron intermediates.

Substitution proceeds via a dissociative mechanism:

M(CO)_{n} → M(CO)_{n−1} + CO
M(CO)_{n−1} + L → M(CO)_{n−1}L

The dissociation energy is 105 kJ/mol (25 kcal/mol) for nickel tetracarbonyl and 155 kJ/mol (37 kcal/mol) for chromium hexacarbonyl.

Substitution in 17-electron complexes, which are rare, proceeds via associative mechanisms with a 19-electron intermediates.

M(CO)_{n} + L → M(CO)_{n}L
M(CO)_{n}L → M(CO)_{n−1}L + CO

The rate of substitution in 18-electron complexes is sometimes catalysed by catalytic amounts of oxidants, via electron transfer.

=== Reduction ===
Metal carbonyls react with reducing agents such as metallic sodium or sodium amalgam to give carbonylmetalate (or carbonylate) anions. Polynuclear or electron-imprecise clusters add the reductant to give mononuclear anions:

Mn_{2}(CO)_{10} + 2 Na → 2 Na[Mn(CO)_{5}]

Conversely, electron-precise mononuclear compounds lose CO and may form clusters:

Fe(CO)_{5} + 2 Na → Na_{2}[Fe(CO)_{4}] + CO
2 Cr(CO)_{6} + 2 Na → Na_{2}Cr_{2}(CO)_{10}

Mercury can insert into the metal–metal bonds of some polynuclear metal carbonyls:

Co_{2}(CO)_{8} + Hg → (CO)_{4}Co−Hg−Co(CO)_{4}

=== Nucleophilic attack at CO ===
The CO ligand is often susceptible to attack by nucleophiles. For example, trimethylamine oxide and potassium bis(trimethylsilyl)amide convert CO ligands to CO_{2} and CN^{−}, respectively. In the "Hieber base reaction", hydroxide ion attacks the CO ligand to give a metallacarboxylic acid, followed by the release of carbon dioxide and the formation of metal hydrides or carbonylmetalates. A well-studied example of this nucleophilic addition is the conversion of iron pentacarbonyl to hydridoiron tetracarbonyl anion:

Fe(CO)_{5} + NaOH → Na[Fe(CO)_{4}CO_{2}H]
Na[Fe(CO)_{4}COOH] + NaOH → Na[HFe(CO)_{4}] + NaHCO_{3}

Hydride reagents also attack CO ligands, especially in cationic metal complexes, to give the formyl derivative:

[Re(CO)_{6}]^{+} + H^{−} → Re(CO)_{5}CHO

Organolithium reagents add with metal carbonyls to acylmetal carbonyl anions. O-Alkylation of these anions, such as with Meerwein salts, affords Fischer carbenes.

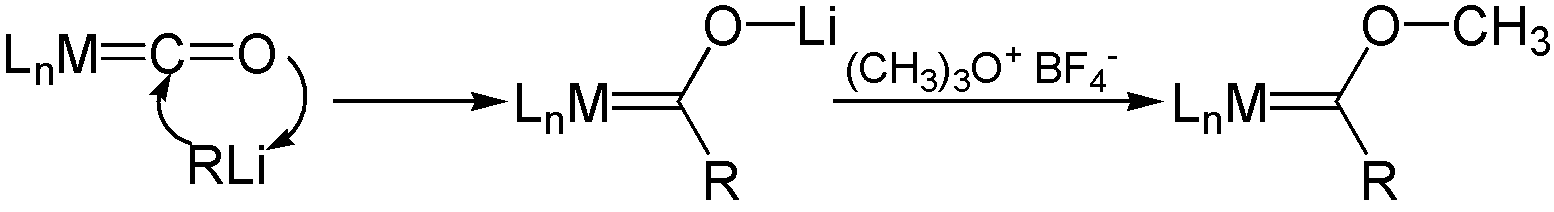
Synthesis of Fischer carbenes

=== With electrophiles ===
Despite being in low formal oxidation states, metal carbonyls are relatively unreactive toward many electrophiles. For example, they resist attack by alkylating agents, mild acids, and mild oxidizing agents. Most metal carbonyls do undergo halogenation. Iron pentacarbonyl, for example, forms ferrous carbonyl halides:

Fe(CO)_{5} + X_{2} → Fe(CO)_{4}X_{2} + CO

Metal–metal bonds are cleaved by halogens. Depending on the electron-counting scheme used, this can be regarded as an oxidation of the metal atoms:

Mn_{2}(CO)_{10} + Cl_{2} → 2 Mn(CO)_{5}Cl

== Compounds ==
Most metal carbonyl complexes contain a mixture of ligands. Examples include the historically important IrCl(CO)(P(C_{6}H_{5})_{3})_{2} and the antiknock agent (CH_{3}C_{5}H_{4})Mn(CO)_{3}. The parent compounds for many of these mixed ligand complexes are the binary carbonyls, those species of the formula [M_{x}(CO)_{n}]^{z}, many of which are commercially available. The formulae of many metal carbonyls can be inferred from the 18-electron rule.

=== Binary, charge-neutral ===
- Group 2 elements calcium, strontium, and barium can all form octacarbonyl complexes M(CO)_{8} (M = Ca Sr, Ba). The compounds were characterized in cryogenic matrices by vibrational spectroscopy and in gas phase by mass spectrometry.
- Group 4 elements with 4 valence electrons are expected to form heptacarbonyls; while these are extremely rare, substituted derivatives of Ti(CO)_{7} are known.
- Group 5 elements with 5 valence electrons, again are subject to steric effects that prevent the formation of M–M bonded species such as V_{2}(CO)_{12}, which is unknown. The 17-VE V(CO)_{6} is however well known.
- Group 6 elements with 6 valence electrons form hexacarbonyls Cr(CO)_{6}, Mo(CO)_{6}, W(CO)_{6}, and Sg(CO)_{6}. Group 6 elements (as well as group 7) are also well known for exhibiting the cis effect (the labilization of CO in the cis position) in organometallic synthesis.
- Group 7 elements with 7 valence electrons form pentacarbonyl dimers Mn_{2}(CO)_{10}, Tc_{2}(CO)_{10}, and Re_{2}(CO)_{10}.
- Group 8 elements with 8 valence electrons form pentacarbonyls Fe(CO)_{5}, Ru(CO)_{5} and Os(CO)_{5}. The heavier two members are unstable, tending to decarbonylate to give Ru_{3}(CO)_{12}, and Os_{3}(CO)_{12}. The two other principal iron carbonyls are Fe_{3}(CO)_{12} and Fe_{2}(CO)_{9}.
- Group 9 elements with 9 valence electrons and are expected to form tetracarbonyl dimers M_{2}(CO)_{8}. In fact the cobalt derivative of this octacarbonyl is the only stable member, but all three tetramers are well known: Co_{4}(CO)_{12}, Rh_{4}(CO)_{12}, Rh_{6}(CO)_{16}, and Ir_{4}(CO)_{12}. Co_{2}(CO)_{8} unlike the majority of the other 18 VE transition metal carbonyls is sensitive to oxygen.
- Group 10 elements with 10 valence electrons form tetracarbonyls such as Ni(CO)_{4}. Curiously Pd(CO)_{4} and Pt(CO)_{4} are not stable.

=== Binary, anionic ===
- Group 3 elements scandium and yttrium, as well as lanthanum, form the 20-electron monoanions [Sc(CO)_{8}]^{−}, [Y(CO)_{8}]^{−}, and [La(CO)_{8}]^{−}.
- Group 4 elements as dianions resemble neutral group 6 derivatives: [Ti(CO)_{6}]^{2−}.
- Group 5 elements as monoanions resemble again neutral group 6 derivatives: [V(CO)_{6}]^{−}.
- Group 6 elements form (inter alia) anions with the lowest known oxidation state for transition metals: Cr(CO)^{4−}_{3}, Mo(CO)^{4−}_{3}, and W(CO)^{4−}_{3}.
- Group 7 elements as monoanions resemble neutral group 8 derivatives: [Mn(CO)_{5}]^{−}, [Tc(CO)_{5}]^{−}, [Re(CO)_{5}]^{−}.
- Group 8 elements as dianaions resemble neutral group 10 derivatives: [Fe(CO)_{4}]^{2−}, [Ru(CO)_{4}]^{2−}, [Os(CO)_{4}]^{2−}. Condensed derivatives are also known.
- Group 9 elements as monoanions resemble neutral group 10 metal carbonyl. [Co(CO)_{4}]^{−} is the best studied member.

Large anionic clusters of nickel, palladium, and platinum are also well known. Many metal carbonyl anions can be protonated to give metal carbonyl hydrides.

=== Binary, cationic ===
- Group 2 elements form [M(CO)_{8}]^{+} (M = Ca Sr, Ba), characterized in gas phase by mass spectrometry and vibrational spectroscopy.
- Group 3 elements form [Sc(CO)_{7}]^{+} and [Y(CO)_{8}]^{+} in gas phase.
- Group 7 elements as monocations resemble neutral group 6 derivative [M(CO)_{6}]^{+} (M = Mn, Tc, Re).
- Group 8 elements as dications also resemble neutral group 6 derivatives [M(CO)_{6}]^{2+} (M = Fe, Ru, Os).

=== Nonclassical ===
Nonclassical describes those carbonyl complexes where ν_{CO} is higher than that for free carbon monoxide. In nonclassical CO complexes, the C-O distance is shorter than free CO (113.7 pm). The structure of [Fe(CO)_{6}]^{2+}, with d_{C-O} = 112.9 pm, illustrates this effect. These complexes are usually cationic, sometimes dicationic.

== Applications ==
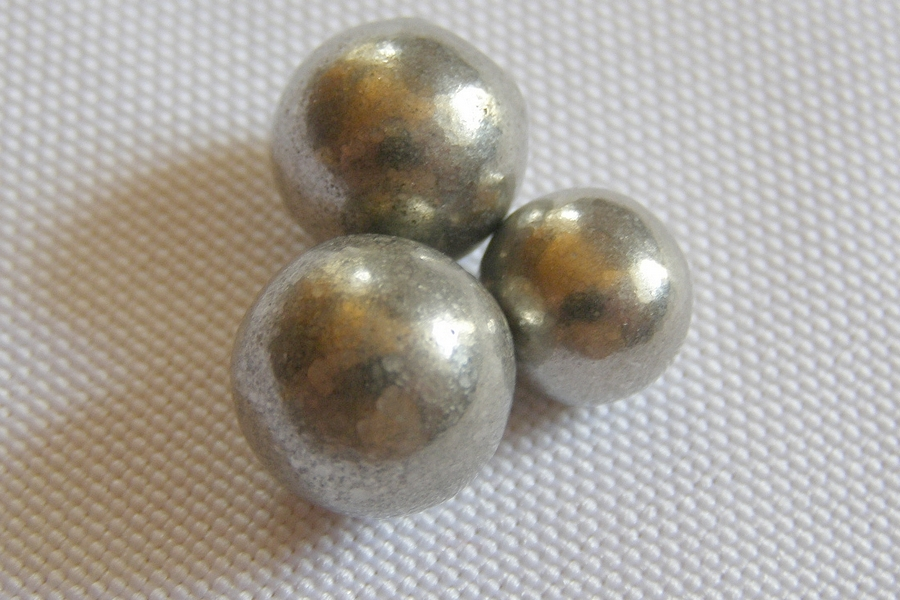
Spheres of nickel manufactured by the Mond process

=== Metallurgical uses ===
Metal carbonyls are used in several industrial processes. Perhaps the earliest application was the extraction and purification of nickel via nickel tetracarbonyl by the Mond process (see also carbonyl metallurgy).

By a similar process carbonyl iron, a highly pure metal powder, is prepared by thermal decomposition of iron pentacarbonyl. Carbonyl iron is used inter alia for the preparation of inductors, pigments, as dietary supplements, in the production of radar-absorbing materials in the stealth technology, and in thermal spraying.

=== Catalysis ===
Metal carbonyls are used in a number of industrially important carbonylation reactions. In the oxo process, an alkene, hydrogen gas, and carbon monoxide react together with a catalyst (such as dicobalt octacarbonyl) to give aldehydes. Illustrative is the production of butyraldehyde from propylene:

CH_{3}CH=CH_{2} + H_{2} + CO → CH_{3}CH_{2}CH_{2}CHO

Butyraldehyde is converted on an industrial scale to 2-ethylhexanol, a precursor to PVC plasticizers, by aldol condensation, followed by hydrogenation of the resulting hydroxyaldehyde. The "oxo aldehydes" resulting from hydroformylation are used for large-scale synthesis of fatty alcohols, which are precursors to detergents. The hydroformylation is a reaction with high atom economy, especially if the reaction proceeds with high regioselectivity.

Another important reaction catalyzed by metal carbonyls is the hydrocarboxylation. The example below is for the synthesis of acrylic acid and acrylic acid esters:

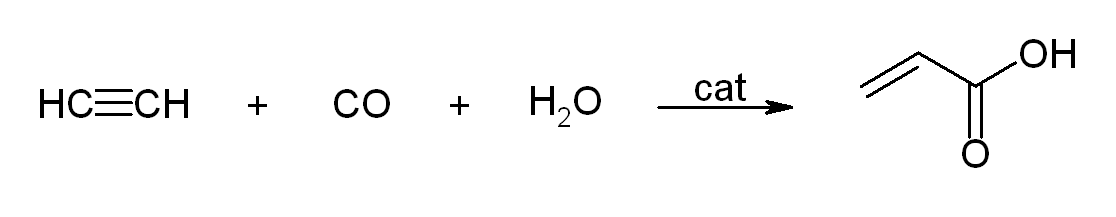

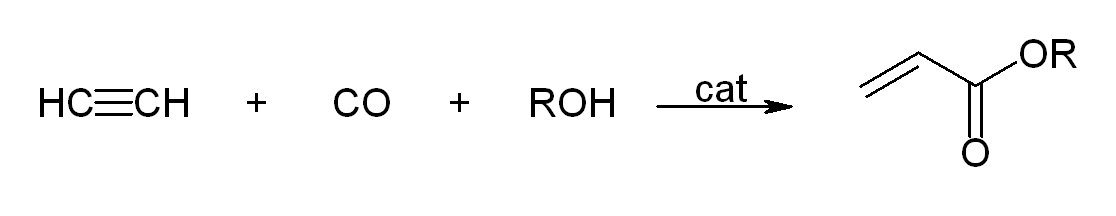

Also the cyclization of acetylene to cyclooctatetraene uses metal carbonyl catalysts:

In the Monsanto and Cativa processes, acetic acid is produced from methanol, carbon monoxide, and water using hydrogen iodide as well as rhodium and iridium carbonyl catalysts, respectively. Related carbonylation reactions afford acetic anhydride.

=== CO-releasing molecules (CO-RMs) ===
Carbon monoxide-releasing molecules are metal carbonyl complexes that are being developed as potential drugs to release CO. At low concentrations, CO functions as a vasodilatory and an anti-inflammatory agent. CO-RMs have been conceived as a pharmacological strategic approach to carry and deliver controlled amounts of CO to tissues and organs.

== Related compounds ==
Many ligands are known to form homoleptic and mixed ligand complexes that are analogous to the metal carbonyls.

=== Nitrosyl complexes ===
Metal nitrosyls, compounds featuring NO ligands, are numerous. In contrast to metal carbonyls, however, homoleptic metal nitrosyls are rare. NO is a stronger π-acceptor than CO. Well known nitrosyl carbonyls include CoNO(CO)_{3} and Fe(NO)_{2}(CO)_{2}, which are analogues of Ni(CO)_{4}.

=== Thiocarbonyl complexes ===
Complexes containing CS are known but uncommon. The rarity of such complexes is partly attributable to the fact that the obvious source material, carbon monosulfide, is unstable. Thus, the synthesis of thiocarbonyl complexes requires indirect routes, such as the reaction of disodium tetracarbonylferrate with thiophosgene:

Na_{2}Fe(CO)_{4} + CSCl_{2} → Fe(CO)_{4}CS + 2 NaCl

Complexes of CSe and CTe have been characterized.

=== Isocyanide complexes ===
Isocyanides also form extensive families of complexes that are related to the metal carbonyls. Typical isocyanide ligands are methyl isocyanide and t-butyl isocyanide (Me_{3}CNC). A special case is CF_{3}NC, an unstable molecule that forms stable complexes whose behavior closely parallels that of the metal carbonyls.

== Toxicology ==
The toxicity of metal carbonyls is due to toxicity of carbon monoxide, the metal, and because of the volatility and instability of the complexes, any inherent toxicity of the metal is generally made much more severe due to ease of exposure. Exposure occurs by inhalation, or for liquid metal carbonyls by ingestion or due to the good fat solubility by skin resorption. Most clinical experience were gained from toxicological poisoning with nickel tetracarbonyl and iron pentacarbonyl due to their use in industry. Nickel tetracarbonyl is considered as one of the strongest inhalation poisons.

Inhalation of nickel tetracarbonyl causes acute non-specific symptoms similar to a carbon monoxide poisoning, such as nausea, cough, headache, fever, and dizziness. After some time, severe pulmonary symptoms such as cough, tachycardia, and cyanosis, or problems in the gastrointestinal tract occur. In addition to pathological alterations of the lung, such as by metalation of the alveoli, damages are observed in the brain, liver, kidneys, adrenal glands, and spleen. A metal carbonyl poisoning often necessitates a lengthy recovery.

Chronic exposure by inhalation of low concentrations of nickel tetracarbonyl can cause neurological symptoms such as insomnia, headaches, dizziness and memory loss. Nickel tetracarbonyl is considered carcinogenic, but it can take 20 to 30 years from the start of exposure to the clinical manifestation of cancer.

== History ==
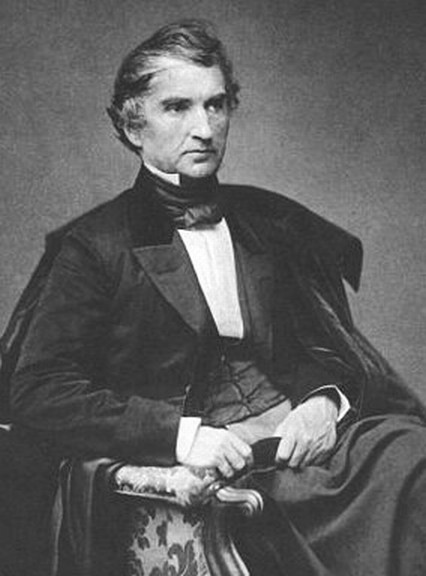
Justus von Liebig (1860)

Initial experiments on the reaction of carbon monoxide with metals were carried out by Justus von Liebig in 1834. By passing carbon monoxide over molten potassium he prepared a substance having the empirical formula KCO, which he called Kohlenoxidkalium. As demonstrated later, the compound was not a carbonyl, but the potassium salt of benzenehexol (K_{6}C_{6}O_{6}) and the potassium salt of acetylenediol (K_{2}C_{2}O_{2}).

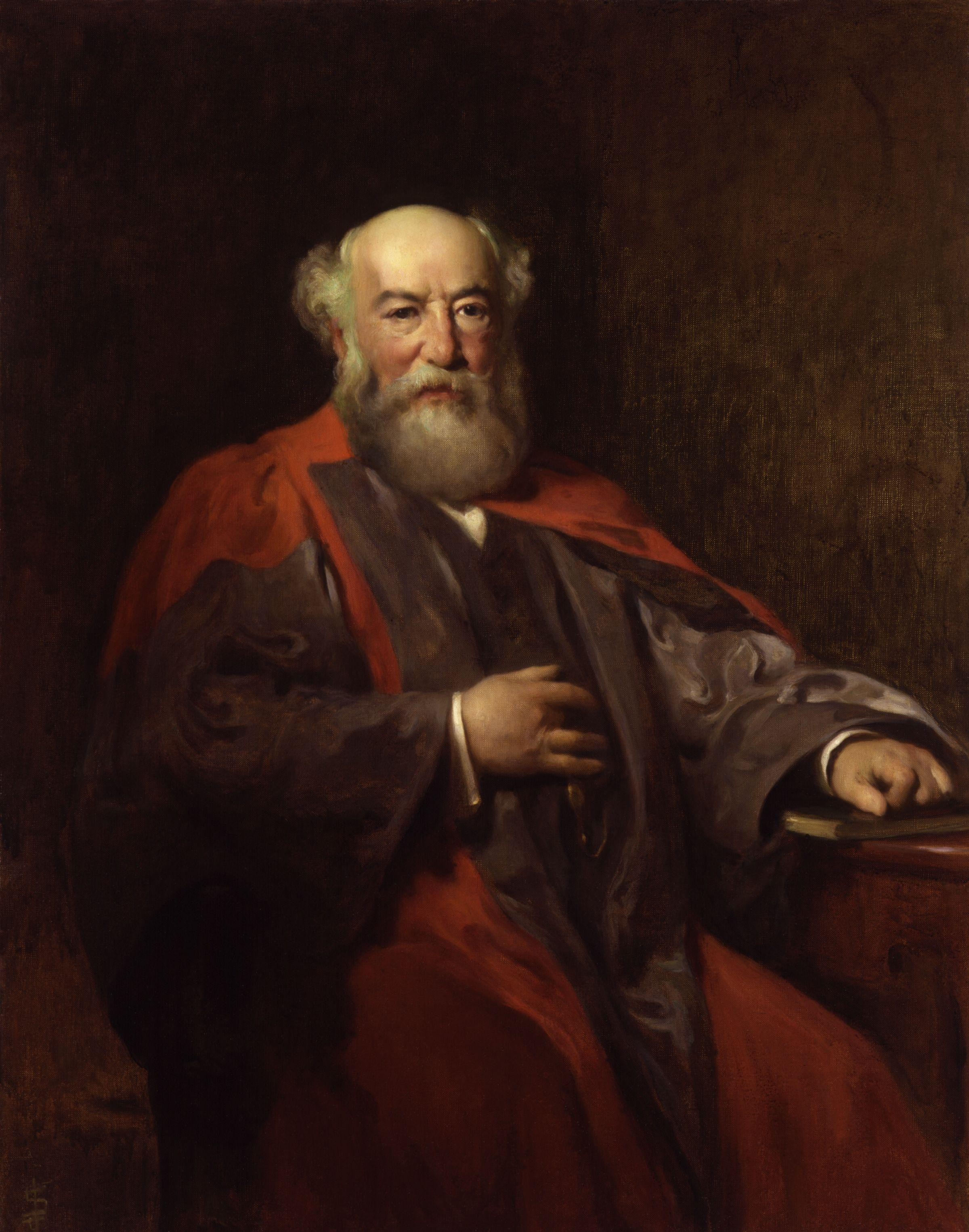
Ludwig Mond, circa 1909

The synthesis of the first true heteroleptic metal carbonyl complex was performed by Paul Schützenberger in 1868 by passing chlorine and carbon monoxide over platinum black, where dicarbonyldichloroplatinum (Pt(CO)_{2}Cl_{2}) was formed.

Ludwig Mond, one of the founders of Imperial Chemical Industries, investigated in the 1890s with Carl Langer and Friedrich Quincke various processes for the recovery of chlorine which was lost in the Solvay process by nickel metals, oxides, and salts. As part of their experiments the group treated nickel with carbon monoxide. They found that the resulting gas colored the gas flame of a burner in a greenish-yellowish color; when heated in a glass tube it formed a nickel mirror. The gas could be condensed to a colorless, water-clear liquid with a boiling point of 43 °C. Thus, Mond and his coworker had discovered the first pure, homoleptic metal carbonyl, nickel tetracarbonyl (Ni(CO)_{4}). The unusual high volatility of the metal compound nickel tetracarbonyl led Kelvin to the statement that Mond had "given wings to the heavy metals".

The following year, Mond and Marcellin Berthelot independently discovered iron pentacarbonyl, which is produced by a similar procedure as nickel tetracarbonyl. Mond recognized the economic potential of this class of compounds, which he commercially used in the Mond process and financed more research on related compounds. Heinrich Hirtz and his colleague M. Dalton Cowap synthesized metal carbonyls of cobalt, molybdenum, ruthenium, and diiron nonacarbonyl. In 1906 James Dewar and H. O. Jones were able to determine the structure of diiron nonacarbonyl, which is produced from iron pentacarbonyl by the action of sunlight. After Mond, who died in 1909, the chemistry of metal carbonyls fell for several years in oblivion. BASF started in 1924 the industrial production of iron pentacarbonyl by a process which was developed by Alwin Mittasch. The iron pentacarbonyl was used for the production of high-purity iron, so-called carbonyl iron, and iron oxide pigment. Not until 1927 did A. Job and A. Cassal succeed in the preparation of chromium hexacarbonyl and tungsten hexacarbonyl, the first synthesis of other homoleptic metal carbonyls.

Walter Hieber played in the years following 1928 a decisive role in the development of metal carbonyl chemistry. He systematically investigated and discovered, among other things, the Hieber base reaction, the first known route to metal carbonyl hydrides and synthetic pathways leading to metal carbonyls such as dirhenium decacarbonyl. Hieber, who was since 1934 the Director of the Institute of Inorganic Chemistry at the Technical University of Munich published in four decades 249 papers on metal carbonyl chemistry.

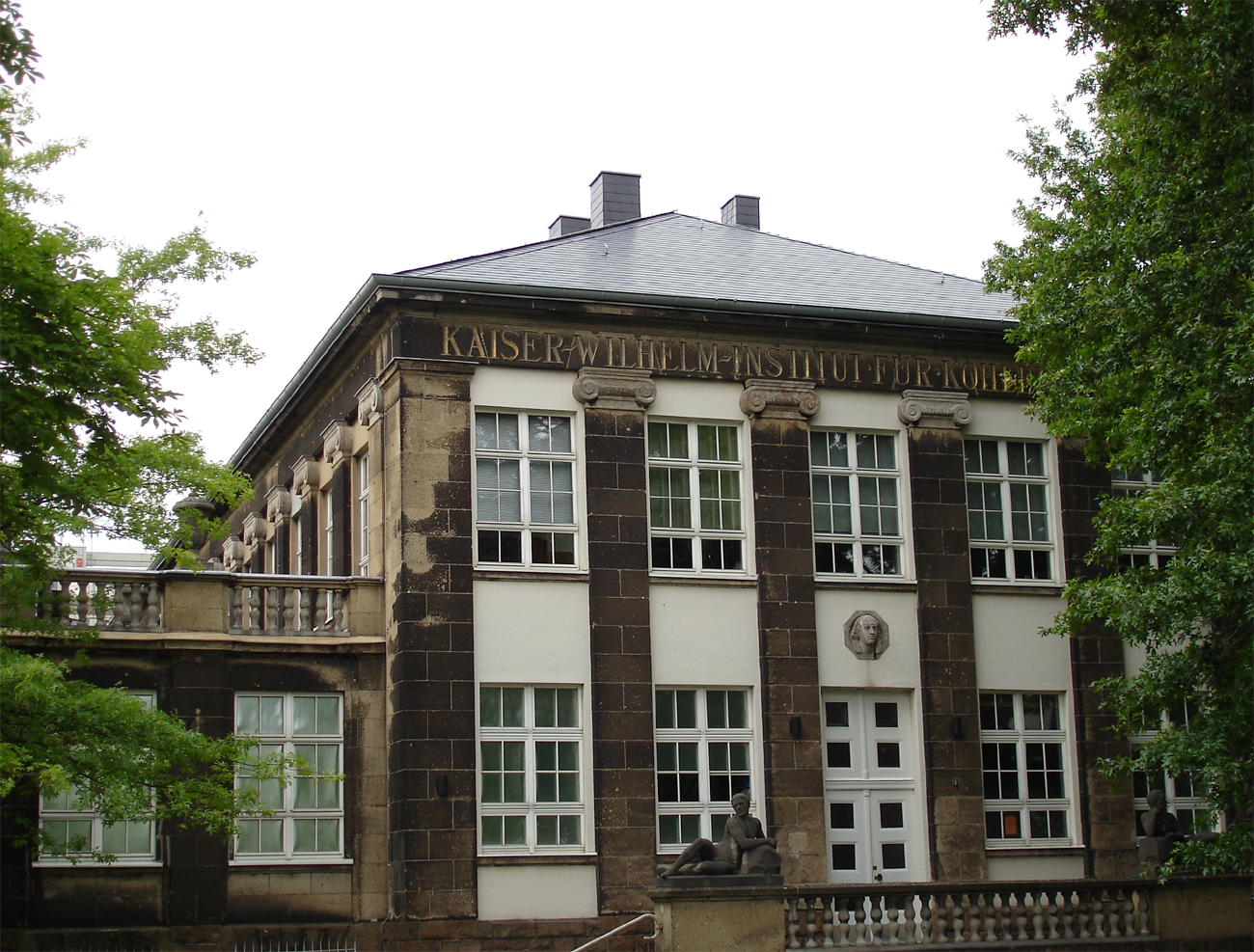
Kaiser Wilhelm Institute for Coal Research (now Max Planck Institute for Coal Research)

Also in the 1930s Walter Reppe, an industrial chemist and later board member of BASF, discovered a number of homogeneous catalytic processes, such as the hydrocarboxylation, in which olefins or alkynes react with carbon monoxide and water to form products such as unsaturated acids and their derivatives. In these reactions, for example, nickel tetracarbonyl or cobalt carbonyls act as catalysts. Reppe also discovered the cyclotrimerization and tetramerization of acetylene and its derivatives to benzene and benzene derivatives with metal carbonyls as catalysts. BASF built in the 1960s a production facility for acrylic acid by the Reppe process, which was only superseded in 1996 by more modern methods based on the catalytic propylene oxidation.

Isolobal fragments with tetrahedral or octahedral geometry

For the rational design of new complexes the concept of the isolobal analogy has been found useful. Roald Hoffmann was awarded the Nobel Prize in chemistry for the development of the concept. This describes metal carbonyl fragments of M(CO)_{n} as parts of octahedral building blocks in analogy to the tetrahedral CH_{3}–, CH_{2}– or CH– fragments in organic chemistry. In example dimanganese decacarbonyl is formed in terms of the isolobal analogy of two d^{7} Mn(CO)_{5} fragments, that are isolobal to the methyl radical CH^{•}_{3}. In analogy to how methyl radicals combine to form ethane, these can combine to dimanganese decacarbonyl. The presence of isolobal analog fragments does not mean that the desired structures can be synthesized. In his Nobel Prize lecture Hoffmann emphasized that the isolobal analogy is a useful but simple model, and in some cases does not lead to success.

The economic benefits of metal-catalysed carbonylations, such as Reppe chemistry and hydroformylation, led to growth of the area. Metal carbonyl compounds were discovered in the active sites of three naturally occurring enzymes.

== See also ==
- Metal carbonyl cluster
- Metal carbon dioxide complex
- Metal phosphine complex
- Alkaline earth octacarbonyl complex
