= Walter Hieber =

German chemist (1895–1976)

- Born: 18 December 1895
- Died: 29 November 1976 (aged 80)
- Education: University of Tübingen, University of Würzburg, Heidelberg University
- Scientific career
- Workplaces: Technical University of Munich, Heidelberg University, University of Greifswald, Marburg University
- Doctoral students: Ernst Otto Fischer

Walter Hieber (18 December 1895 – 29 November 1976) was an inorganic chemist, known as the father of metal carbonyl chemistry. He was born 18 December 1895 and died 29 November 1976. Hieber's father was Johannes Hieber, an influential evangelical minister and politician.

Hieber was educated at the University of Tübingen, the University of Würzburg, and Heidelberg University. In 1935, he was appointed Director of the Inorganic Chemical Institute at the Technical University of Munich.

Among his numerous research findings, Hieber prepared the first metal carbonyl hydrides such as H_{2}Fe(CO)_{4} and HMn(CO)_{5}. He discovered that metal carbonyls undergo nucleophilic attack by hydroxide, the “Hieber base reaction.” He and his students discovered several metal carbonyl compounds such as Re_{2}(CO)_{10} and Os_{3}(CO)_{12} He pioneered the development of metal carbonyl sulfides. Hieber is also known for his work with the cis effect, also known as the labilization of CO ligands in the cis position in octahedral complexes.

Hieber was highly decorated for his work, including in 1951 the Alfred Stock Prize. One of his most famous students was Nobel Prize winner Ernst Otto Fischer. His first foreign student was John Anderson, FRS, in 1931.
