= Dirhenium decacarbonyl =

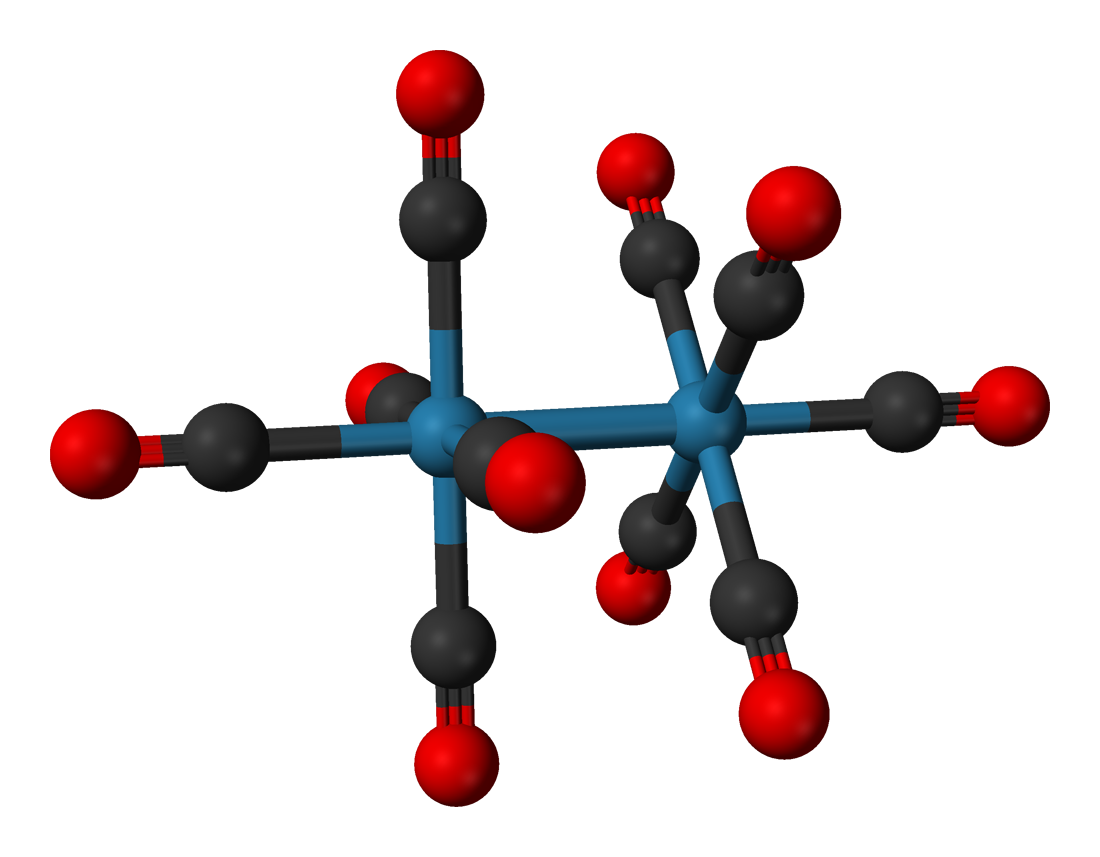

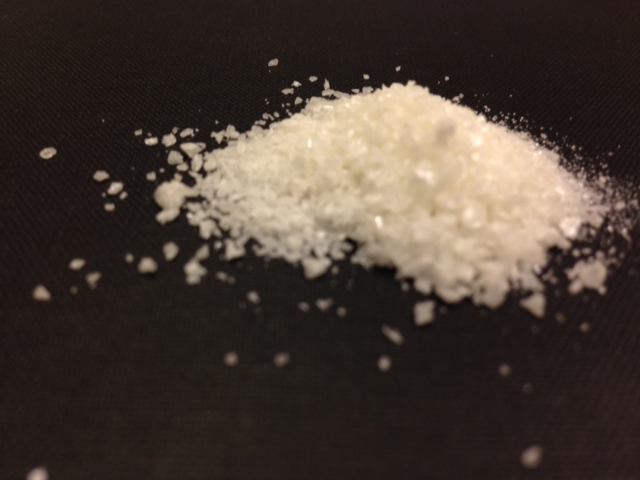

Names
- IUPAC name bis(pentacarbonylrhenium)(Re—Re)
- Other names Rhenium carbonyl; rhenium pentacarbonyl

Identifiers
| CAS Number | 14285-68-8 |
| 3D model (JSmol) | Interactive image |
| ChemSpider | 436546 |
| ECHA InfoCard | 100.034.714 |
| EC Number | 238-202-8 |
| PubChem CID | 518917 |
- InChI: InChI=1S/10CO.2Re/c10*1-2;; Key: ZIZHEHXAMPQGEK-UHFFFAOYSA-N; InChI=1/10CO.2Re/c10*1-2;; Key: ZIZHEHXAMPQGEK-UHFFFAOYAX
- SMILES: [Re].[Re].[C-]#[O+].[O+]#[C-].[O+]#[C-].[O+]#[C-].[O+]#[C-].[O+]#[C-].[O+]#[C-].[O+]#[C-].[O+]#[C-].[O+]#[C-]

Properties
| Chemical formula | Re_{2}(CO)_{10} |
| Molar mass | 652.52 g/mol |
| Melting point | 170 °C (338 °F; 443 K) (decomposes) |

Hazards
- GHS labelling
| Pictograms | (GHS06: Toxic) (GHS07: Exclamation mark) |
| Signal word | Danger |
| Hazard statements | H301, H330, H331, H332 |
| Precautionary statements | P261, P271, P304+P340+P311, P403+P233, P405, P501 |
- Except where otherwise noted, data are given for materials in their standard state (at 25 °C [77 °F], 100 kPa). verify (what is ?) Infobox references

Dirhenium decacarbonyl is the inorganic compound with the chemical formula Re_{2}(CO)_{10} . Commercially available, it is used as a starting point for the synthesis of many rhenium carbonyl complexes. It was first reported in 1941 by Walter Hieber, who prepared it by reductive carbonylation of rhenium. The compound consists of a pair of square pyramidal Re(CO)_{5} units joined via a Re-Re bond, which produces a homoleptic carbonyl complex.

== History ==
In the 1930s Robert Mond developed methods which used increased pressure and temperature to produce various forms of metal carbonyl . A prominent scientist of the twentieth century, Walter Hieber was crucial to the further development of specifically the dirhenium decacarbonyl. Initial efforts produced mononuclear metal complexes, but upon further evaluation, Hieber discovered that by using Re_{2}O_{7} as a starting material with no solvent, a dirhenium complex could be achieved producing a Re-Re interaction.

== Structure and properties ==
The crystal structure of Re_{2}(CO)_{10} is relatively well known. The compound consists of a pair of square pyramidal Re(CO)_{5} units linked by a Re-Re bond. There are two different conformations that can occur: staggered and eclipsed. The eclipsed conformation occurs about 30% of the time, producing a D_{4h} point group, but the staggered form, with point group D_{4d}, is more stable. The Re-Re bond length was experimentally found to be 3.04Å.

The Re atom exists in a slightly distorted octahedral configuration with the C axial-Re-C equatorial angle equal to 88°. The mean Re-C bond length of 2.01 Å is the same for the axial and equatorial positions. The mean C-O distance is 1.16 Å.

This compound has a broad IR absorption band at 1800 cm^{−1} region can be assigned to two components centered at 1780 and 1830 cm^{−1}, resulting from CO adsorption. The remaining nine CO groups in Re_{2}(CO)_{10} give the complex IR absorption in the 1950–2150 cm^{−1} region. Free Re_{2}(CO)_{10} (point symmetry D_{4d} ) has a CO stretch representation of 2A_{1}+E_{2} + E_{3}+ 2B_{2} +E_{1}, where 2B_{2} + E_{1} are IR active. For an axially perturbed (C_{4v}) Re_{2}(CO)_{10} molecule, the CO stretch representation was found to be 2E+B_{1}+B_{2}+3A_{1}, where the IR active modes are 2E+3A_{1}.

Its identity can also be confirmed by mass spectrometry, using the isotopic pattern of rhenium (^{185}Re and ^{187}Re).

== Synthesis ==
Dirhenium decacarbonyl may be obtained by reductive carbonylation of rhenium(VII) oxide (Re_{2}O_{7}) at 350 atm and 250 °C.

Re_{2}O_{7} + 17 CO → Re_{2}(CO)_{10} + 7 CO_{2}

It can also be prepared by the reaction of a methanol solution of sodium perrhenate and carbon monoxide at 230 °C and 115 atm.

== Reactions ==
The carbonyl ligands may be displaced by other ligands such as phosphines and phosphites (denoted L).

Re_{2}(CO)_{10} + 2 L → Re_{2}(CO)_{8}L_{2}

This compound may also be "cracked" to mononuclear Re(I) carbonyl complexes by halogenation:

Re_{2}(CO)_{10} + X_{2} → 2 Re(CO)_{5}X (X = Cl, Br, I)

When bromine is used, bromopentacarbonylrhenium(I) is formed, which is an intermediate for many more rhenium complexes. This compound may also be hydrogenated to form various polyrhenium complexes, eventually giving elemental rhenium.

Re_{2}(CO)_{10} → H_{3}Re_{3}(CO)_{12} → H_{5}Re_{4}(CO)_{12} → Re (metal)

In the presence of water, photolysis of Re_{2}(CO)_{10} yields a hydroxide complex:

Re_{2}(CO)_{10} → HRe(CO)_{5} + Re_{4}(CO)_{12}(OH)_{4}

This reaction includes the cleavage of Re-Re bond and the synthesis of HRe(CO)_{5}, which can be used to prepare surface structures designed to incorporate isolated surface-bound Re carbonyl complexes.

Loss of a carbonyl ligand by photolysis generates a coordinatively unsaturated complex that undergoes oxidative addition of Si-H bonds, for example:

Re_{2}(CO)_{10} + HSiCl_{3}* → (CO)_{5}ReHRe(CO)_{4}SiCl_{3} + CO

== Applications ==
Rhenium-based catalysis have been used in metathesis, reforming, hydrogenation and various hydrotreating processes such as hydrodesulfurization. Re_{2}(CO)_{10} can be used to promote the silation of alcohols and prepare the silyl ethers, and its reaction:

RSiH_{3} + R'OH → RH_{2}SiOR' + H_{2}.

== See also ==
- Metal carbonyl
