= Pi backbonding =

Form of interaction between two atoms

In chemistry, pi backbonding or π backbonding is a π-bonding interaction between a filled (or half filled) orbital of a transition metal atom and a vacant orbital on an adjacent ion or molecule. In this type of interaction, electrons from the metal are used to bond to the ligand, which dissipates excess negative charge and stabilizes the metal. It is common in transition metals with low oxidation states that have ligands such as carbon monoxide, olefins, or phosphines. The ligands involved in π backbonding can be broken into three groups: carbonyls and nitrogen analogs, alkenes and alkynes, and phosphines. Compounds where π backbonding is prominent include Ni(CO)_{4}, Zeise's salt, and molybdenum and iron dinitrogen complexes.

== Metal carbonyls, nitrosyls, and isocyanides ==
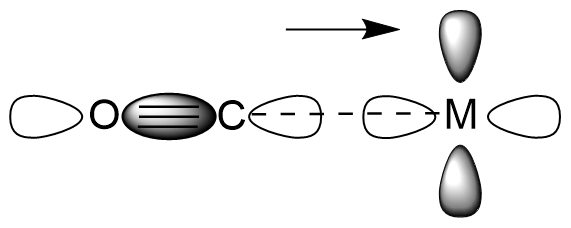
σ bonding from electrons in CO's HOMO to metal center d-orbital.

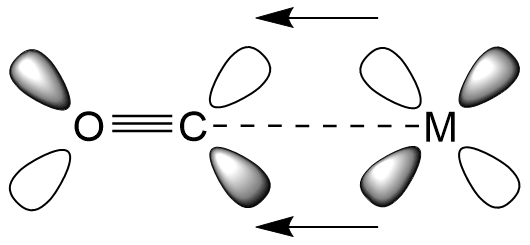
π backbonding from electrons in metal center d-orbital to CO's LUMO.

The electrons are partially transferred from a d-orbital of the metal to anti-bonding molecular orbitals of CO (and its analogs). This electron-transfer strengthens the metal–C bond and weakens the C–O bond. The strengthening of the M–CO bond is reflected in increases of the vibrational frequencies for the M–C bond (often outside of the range for the usual IR spectrophotometers). Furthermore, the M–CO bond length is shortened. The weakening of the C–O bond is indicated by a decrease in the wavenumber of the ν_{CO} band(s) from that for free CO (2143 cm^{−1}), for example to 2060 cm^{−1} in Ni(CO)_{4} and 1981 cm^{−1} in Cr(CO)_{6}, and 1790 cm^{−1} in the anion [Fe(CO)_{4}]^{2−}. For this reason, IR spectroscopy is an important diagnostic technique in metal–carbonyl chemistry. The article infrared spectroscopy of metal carbonyls discusses this in detail.

Many ligands other than CO are strong "backbonders". Nitric oxide is an even stronger π-acceptor than CO and ν_{NO} is a diagnostic tool in metal–nitrosyl chemistry. Isocyanides, RNC, are another class of ligands that are capable of π-backbonding. In contrast with CO, the σ-donor lone pair on the C atom of isocyanides is antibonding in nature and upon complexation the CN bond is strengthened and the ν_{CN} increased. At the same time, π-backbonding lowers the ν_{CN}. Depending on the balance of σ-bonding versus π-backbonding, the ν_{CN} can either be raised (for example, upon complexation with weak π-donor metals, such as Pt(II)) or lowered (for example, upon complexation with strong π-donor metals, such as Ni(0)). For the isocyanides, an additional parameter is the MC=N–C angle, which deviates from 180° in highly electron-rich systems. Other ligands have weak π-backbonding abilities, which creates a labilization effect of CO, which is described by the cis effect.

== Metal–alkene and metal–alkyne complexes ==
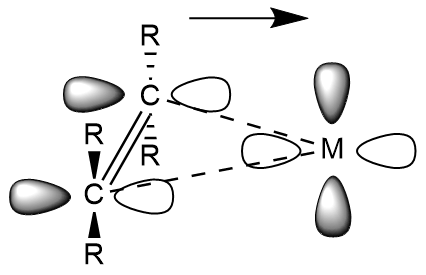
σ bonding from electrons in alkene's HOMO to metal center d-orbital.

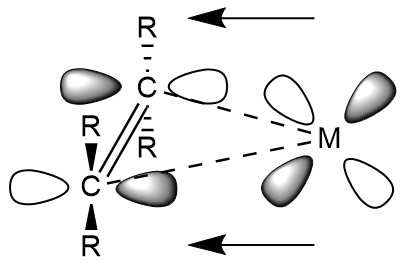
π backbonding from electrons in metal center d-orbital to alkene's LUMO.

As in metal–carbonyls, electrons are partially transferred from a d-orbital of the metal to antibonding molecular orbitals of the alkenes and alkynes. This electron transfer strengthens the metal–ligand bond and weakens the C–C bonds within the ligand. In the case of metal-alkenes and alkynes, the strengthening of the M–C_{2}R_{4} and M–C_{2}R_{2} bond is reflected in bending of the C–C–R angles which assume greater sp^{3} and sp^{2} character, respectively. Thus strong π backbonding causes a metal-alkene complex to assume the character of a metallacyclopropane. Alkenes and alkynes with electronegative substituents exhibit greater π backbonding. Some strong π backbonding ligands are tetrafluoroethylene, tetracyanoethylene, and hexafluoro-2-butyne. In case of d^{10} configured complexes without vacant valence d-orbitals, strong π backbonding renders olefin and arene ligands effectively Z-type acceptor ligands.

== Metal-phosphine complexes ==
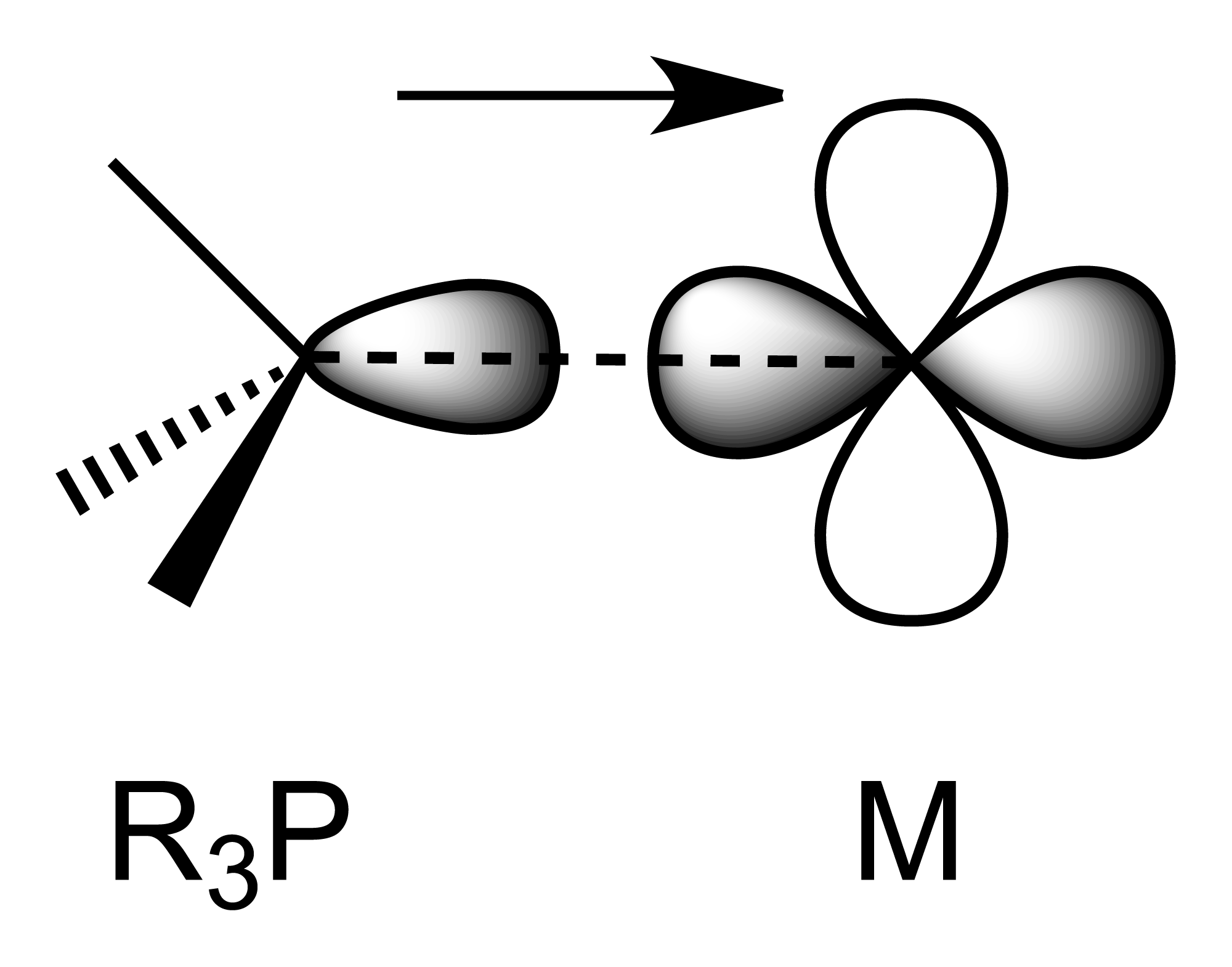
R_{3}P–M σ bonding

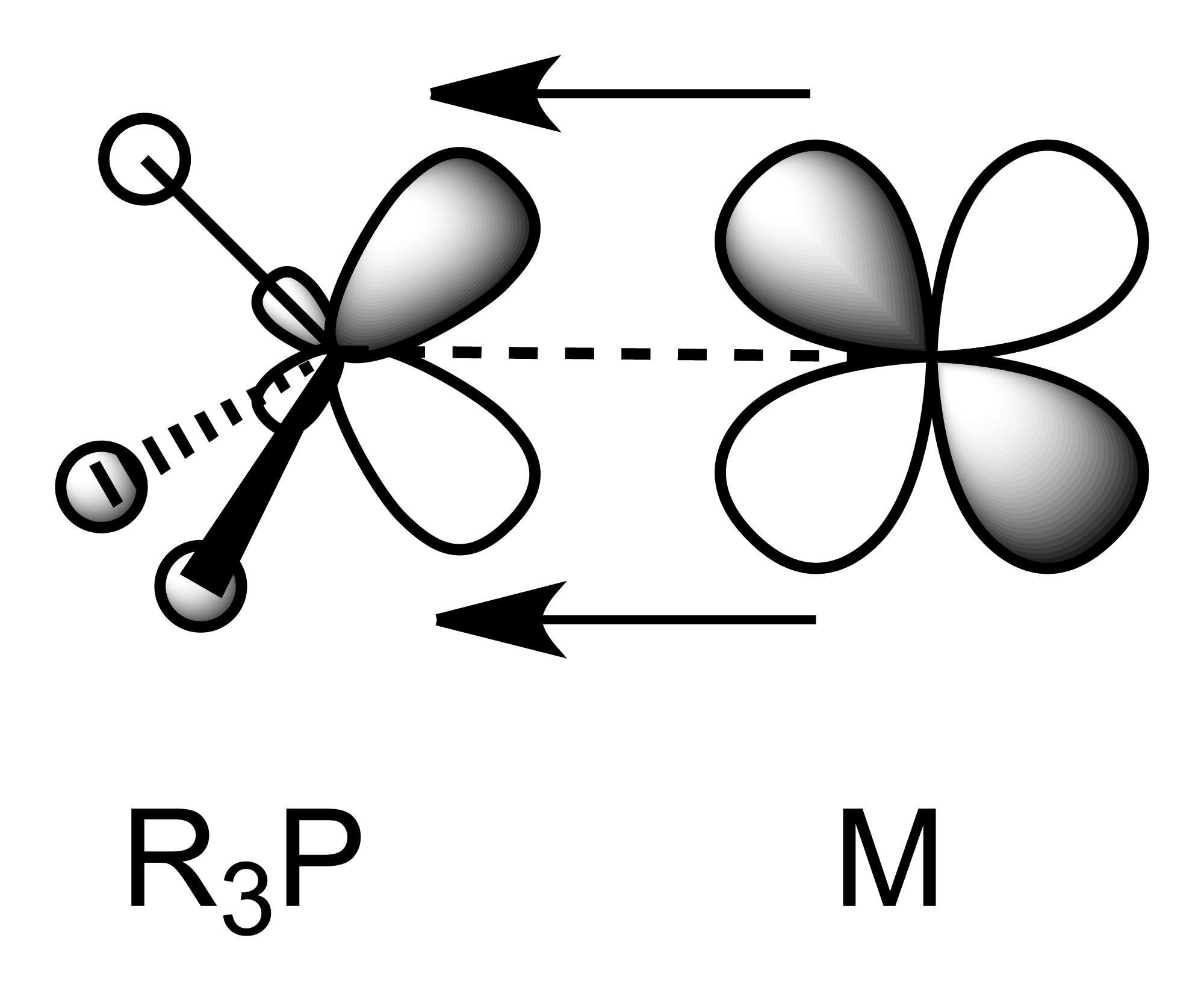
R_{3}P–M π backbonding

Phosphines accept electron density from metal p or d orbitals into combinations of P–C σ* antibonding orbitals that have π symmetry. When phosphines bond to electron-rich metal atoms, backbonding would be expected to lengthen P–C bonds as P–C σ* orbitals become populated by electrons. The expected lengthening of the P–C distance is often hidden by an opposing effect: as the phosphorus lone pair is donated to the metal, P(lone pair)–R(bonding pair) repulsions decrease, which acts to shorten the P–C bond. The two effects have been deconvoluted by comparing the structures of pairs of metal-phosphine complexes that differ only by one electron. Oxidation of R_{3}P–M complexes results in longer M–P bonds and shorter P–C bonds, consistent with π-backbonding. In early work, phosphine ligands were thought to utilize 3d orbitals to form M–P pi-bonding, but it is now accepted that d-orbitals on phosphorus are not involved in bonding as they are too high in energy.

== IUPAC definition of Back Donation ==
The full IUPAC definition of back donation is as follows:

A description of the bonding of π-conjugated ligands to a transition metal which involves a synergic process with donation of electrons from the filled π-orbital or lone electron pair orbital of the ligand into an empty orbital of the metal (donor–acceptor bond), together with release (back donation) of electrons from an nd orbital of the metal (which is of π-symmetry with respect to the metal–ligand axis) into the empty π*-antibonding orbital of the ligand.

== See also ==
- Bridging carbonyl
- Dewar–Chatt–Duncanson model
- 18-electron rule
- Ligand field theory
- Pi-donor ligands
