= Potassium tetracarbonyliron hydride =

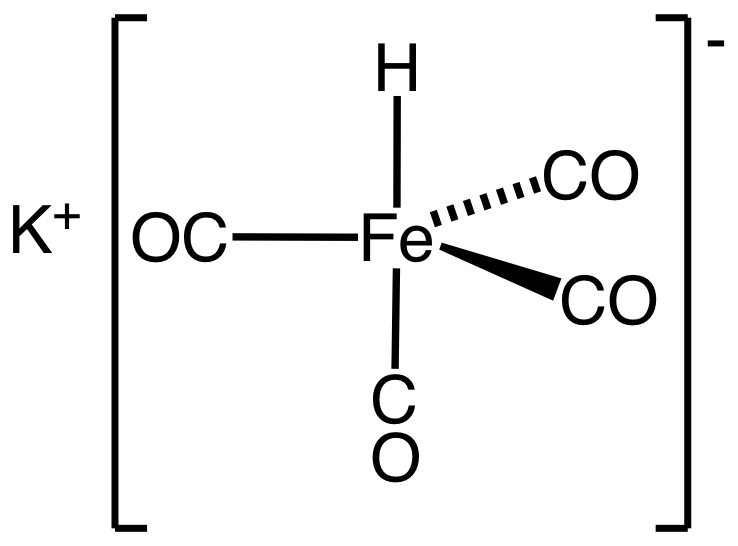

Names
- Other names potassium tetracarbonylhydroferrate(1-)

Identifiers
CAS Number	17857-24-8
3D model (JSmol)	Interactive image
PubChem CID	13932590
- InChI: InChI=1S/4CO.Fe.K.H/c4*1-2;;;/q;;;;-1;+1; Key: ZCWNHXZCHBPQAK-UHFFFAOYSA-N
- SMILES: [C-]#[O+].[C-]#[O+].[C-]#[O+].[C-]#[O+].[K+].[Fe][H-]

Properties
Chemical formula	C_{4}HFeKO_{4}
Molar mass	207.991 g·mol^{−1}
Appearance	yellow solid
- Except where otherwise noted, data are given for materials in their standard state (at 25 °C [77 °F], 100 kPa). Infobox references

Potassium tetracarbonyliron hydride is the inorganic salt with the formula K[HFe(CO)_{4}]. A pale yellow solid, it is the potassium salt of [HFe(CO)_{4}]^{−}, which is the conjugate base of iron tetracarbonyl dihydride:

H_{2}Fe(CO)_{4} + KOH → K[HFe(CO)_{4}] + H_{2}O

Potassium tetracarbonyliron hydride is prepared by treating iron pentacarbonyl with potassium hydroxide:

Fe(CO)_{5} + 2 KOH → K[HFe(CO)_{4}] + KHCO_{3}

Potassium tetracarbonyliron hydride is an intermediate in the synthesis of trisubstituted phosphine complexes:

K[HFe(CO)_{4}] + 3 PBu_{3} + EtOH → Fe(CO)_{2}(PBu_{3})_{3} + EtOK + 2 CO + H_{2}
