= Metallacarboxylic acid =

A metallacarboxylic acid is a metal complex with the ligand CO_{2}H. These compounds are intermediates in reactions that involve carbon monoxide and carbon dioxide, these species are intermediates in the water gas shift reaction. Metallacarboxylic acids are also called hydroxycarbonyls.

== Preparation ==
Metallacarboxylic acids mainly arise by the attack of hydroxide on electrophilic metal carbonyl complexes. An illustrative synthesis is the reaction of a cationic iron carbonyl with a stoichiometric amount of base:

[(C_{5}H_{5})(CO)_{2}FeCO]BF_{4} + NaOH → [(C_{5}H_{5})(CO)_{2}FeCO_{2}H + NaBF_{4}

When applied to simple metal carbonyls, this kind of conversion is sometimes called the Hieber base reaction. Decarboxylation of the resulting anion gives the anionic hydride complex. This conversion is illustrated by the synthesis of [HFe(CO)_{4}]^{−} from iron pentacarbonyl.

Fe(CO)_{5} + NaOH → NaFe(CO)_{4}CO_{2}H
NaFe(CO)_{4}CO_{2}H → NaHFe(CO)_{4} + CO_{2}

== Related compounds ==
Metallacarboxylic acids exist in equilibria with the carboxylate anions, L_{n}MCO_{2}^{−}.

Metallacarboxylate esters (L_{n}MCO_{2}R) arise by the addition of alkoxide to metal carbonyl:

[L_{n}M-CO]^{+} + ROH → [L_{n}M-CO_{2}R] + H^{+}

Metallacarboxylic amides (L_{n}MC(O)NR_{2}) arise by the addition of amide to metal carbonyl:

[L_{n}M-CO]^{+} + 2 RNH_{2} → [L_{n}M-C(O)N(H)R] + RNH_{3}^{+}

Derivatives of metalladithiacarboxylic acids are also known. They are prepared by treating anionic complexes with carbon disulfide.
