= Iron tetracarbonyl dihydride =

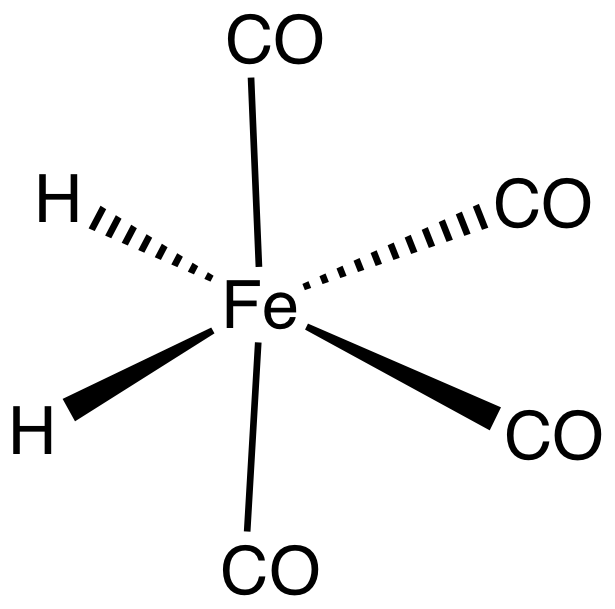

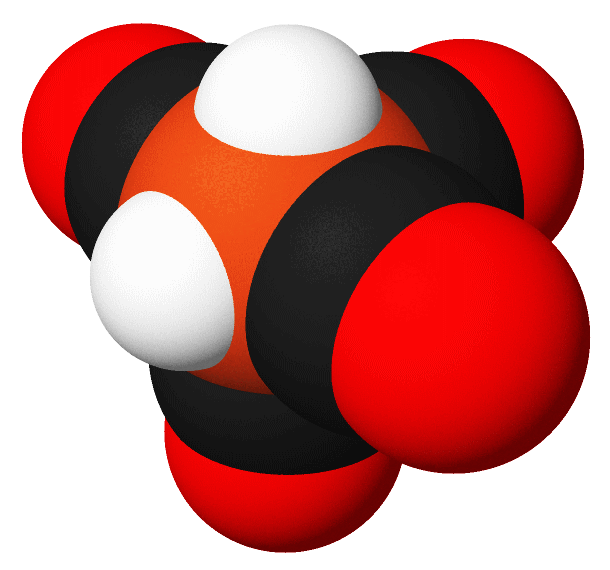

Names
- Preferred IUPAC name Tetracarbonyldihydridoiron(II)
- Other names Iron tetracarbonyl dihydride, tetracarbonyldihydroiron

Identifiers
CAS Number	12002-28-7
3D model (JSmol)	Interactive image
ChemSpider	452380
PubChem CID	518470
- InChI: InChI=1S/4CO.Fe.2H/c4*1-2;;; Key: WZSHZFPIRKSPBD-UHFFFAOYSA-N
- SMILES: O=C=[FeH2](=C=O)(=C=O)=C=O

Properties
Chemical formula	FeC_{4}H_{2}O_{4}
Molar mass	169.901 g mol^{−1}
Appearance	Liquid (at -20 °C)
Melting point	−70 °C (−94 °F; 203 K)
Boiling point	−20 °C (−4 °F; 253 K) (decomposes)
- Except where otherwise noted, data are given for materials in their standard state (at 25 °C [77 °F], 100 kPa). verify (what is ?) Infobox references

Iron tetracarbonyl dihydride is the organometallic compound with the formula H_{2}Fe(CO)_{4}. This compound was the first transition metal hydride discovered. The complex is stable at low temperatures but decomposes rapidly at temperatures above –20 °C.

== Preparation ==
Iron tetracarbonyl dihydride was first produced by Hieber and Leutert from iron pentacarbonyl, which is first converted to HFe(CO)^{−}_{4}:

Fe(CO)_{5} + 2 OH^{−} → HFe(CO)^{−}_{4} + HCO^{−}_{3}
HFe(CO)^{−}_{4} + H^{+} → H_{2}Fe(CO)_{4}

Since the compound is thermally labile and sensitive to light, ideal conditions in 1930's Munich called for winter nights. The early method was called the "polar night synthesis."

As recommended by Hieber and Leutert, the compound can be purified by trap-to-trap distillation.

== Structure and properties ==
In iron tetracarbonyl hydride the Fe(CO)_{4} group has C_{2v} molecular symmetry with a geometry intermediate between octahedral and tetrahedral. Viewed as an octahedral complex, the hydride ligands are cis. Viewed as a tetrahedral Fe(CO)_{4} complex, the hydrides occupy adjacent faces of the tetrahedron. Although the structure of tetracarbonyliron with the hydrogen atoms bound as a single H_{2} ligand has been proposed as an intermediate in some rearrangement reactions, the stable state for the compound has the two atoms as independent ligands.

== Reactions ==
Iron tetracarbonyl dihydride undergoes rapid ligand substitutions by phosphorus ligands:

H_{2}Fe(CO)_{4} + PPh_{3} → H_{2}Fe(CO)_{3}PPh_{3}

The substitution mechanism is proposed to entail transient formation of a 16e^{−} formyl intermediate.

H_{2}Fe(CO)_{4} has pK_{1} of 6.8 and pK_{2} of 15. The monoanion [HFe(CO)_{4}]^{−} has more extensive reaction chemistry because it is more stable than the dihydride. The monoanion is an intermediate in the homogeneous iron-carbonyl-catalyzed water-gas shift reaction (WGSR). The slow step in the WGSR is the proton transfer from water to the iron hydride anion.

HFe(CO)^{−}_{4} + H_{2}O → H_{2}Fe(CO)_{4} + OH^{−}

== See also ==
- Potassium tetracarbonyliron hydride
- Collman's reagent
