= Cis effect =

Destabilization of CO ligands that are cis to other ligands

In inorganic chemistry, the cis effect is defined as the labilization (or destabilization) of CO ligands that are cis to other ligands. CO is a well-known strong pi-accepting ligand in organometallic chemistry that will labilize in the cis position when adjacent to ligands due to steric and electronic effects. The system most often studied for the cis effect is an octahedral complex M(CO)_{5}X where X is the ligand that will labilize a CO ligand cis to it. Unlike the trans effect, which is most often observed in 4-coordinate square planar complexes, the cis effect is observed in 6-coordinate octahedral transition metal complexes. It has been determined that ligands that are weak sigma donors and non-pi acceptors seem to have the strongest cis-labilizing effects. Therefore, the cis effect has the opposite trend of the trans-effect, which effectively labilizes ligands that are trans to strong pi accepting and sigma donating ligands.

== Electron counting in metal carbonyl complexes ==
Group 6 and group 7 transition metal complexes M(CO)_{5}X have been found to be the most prominent in regards to dissociation of the CO cis to ligand X. CO is a neutral ligand that donates 2 electrons to the complex, and therefore lacks anionic or cationic properties that would affect the electron count of the complex. For transition metal complexes that have the formula M(CO)_{5}X, group 6 metals (M^{0}, where the oxidation state of the metal is zero) paired with neutral ligand X, and group 7 metals (M^{+}, where the oxidation state of the metal is +1), paired anionic ligands, will create very stable 18 electron complexes. Transition metal complexes have 9 valence orbitals, and 18 electrons will in turn fill these valences shells, creating a very stable complex, which satisfies the 18-electron rule. The cis-labilization of 18 e^{−} complexes suggests that dissociation of ligand X in the cis position creates a square pyramidal transition state, which lowers the energy of the M(CO)_{4}X complex, enhancing the rate of reaction. The scheme below shows the dissociation pathway of a CO ligand in the cis and trans position to the X, followed by the association of ligand Y. This is an example of a dissociative mechanism, where an 18 e^{−} complex loses a CO ligand, making a 16 e^{−} intermediate, and a final complex of 18 e^{−} results from an incoming ligand inserting in place of the CO. This mechanism resembles the S_{N}1 mechanism in organic chemistry, and applies to coordination compounds as well.

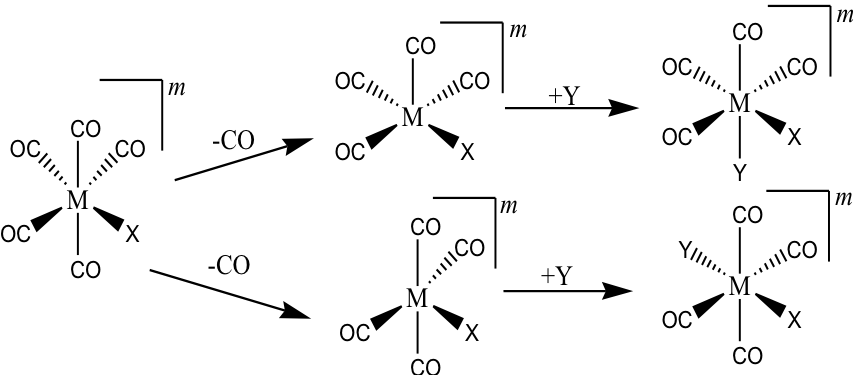

Figure 1. Intermediates in the substitution of M(CO)_{5}X complexes. If ligands X and Y are neutral donors to the complex:

M = Group 6 metal (m = 0)

M = Group 7 metal (m = +1)

== Ligands effects on CO cis-labilization ==
The order of ligands which possess cis-labilizing effects are as follows: CO, AuPPh_{3}, H^{−}, SnPh_{3}, GePh_{3}, M(CO)_{n} < P(O)Ph_{3} < PPh_{3} < I^{−} < CH_{3}SO_{2}^{−}, NC_{5}H_{5} < CH_{3}CO < Br^{−}, NCO^{−} < Cl^{−} < NO_{3}^{−}

Anionic ligands such as F^{−}, Cl^{−}, OH^{−}, and SH^{−} have particularly strong CO labilizing effects in [M(CO)_{5}L]^{−} complexes. This is because these ligands will stabilize the 16 e^{−} intermediate by electron donation from the p-pi lone pair donor orbital. Other sulfur-containing ligands, particularly thiobenzoate, are other examples of particularly useful CO cis-labilizing ligands, which can be explained by stabilization of the intermediate that results upon CO dissociation. This can be attributed to the partial interaction of the oxygen from the thiobenzoate and the metal, which can eliminate solvent effects that can occur during ligand dissociation in transition metal complexes.

Note that the strongest labilizing effects come from ligands that are weak sigma donors with virtually no pi-accepting behavior. The cis effect can be attributed to the role of ligand X in stabilizing the transition state. It has also been determined that labilizing X ligands do in fact strengthen the M-CO bond trans to X, which is hypothesized to be due to the weak pi-accepting and/or sigma donating behavior of ligand X. This lack of strong sigma donation/pi-accepting will allow the CO (a strong pi-acceptor) trans to ligand X to pull electron density toward it, strengthening the M-CO bond. This phenomenon is further supported by the evidence from extensive studies on the trans effect, which in turn shows how ligands that are actually strong sigma donors and pi-acceptors weaken the M-L bond trans to them. Since the cis and trans effects seem to have generally opposite trends, the electronic argument supports both phenomena. Further evidence for cis labilization of CO can be attributed to the CO ligands being in competition for the d_{xy}, d_{yz}, and d_{xz} orbitals. This argument especially holds true when the X is a halogen.
