= Osmium compounds =

| Oxidation state | Representative compound |
|---|---|
| −2 | Na_{2}[Os(CO)_{4}] |
| −1 | Na_{2}[Os_{4}(CO)_{13}] |
| 0 | Os_{3}(CO)_{12} |
| +1 | OsI |
| +2 | OsI_{2} |
| +3 | OsBr_{3} |
| +4 | OsO_{2}, OsCl_{4} |
| +5 | OsF_{5} |
| +6 | OsF_{6} |
| +7 | OsOF_{5} |
| +8 | OsO_{4}, Os(NCH_{3})_{4} |

Osmium compounds are compounds containing the element osmium (Os). Osmium forms compounds with oxidation states ranging from −2 to +8. The most common oxidation states are +2, +3, +4, and +8. The +8 oxidation state is notable for being the highest attained by any chemical element aside from iridium's +9 and is encountered only in xenon, ruthenium, hassium, iridium, and plutonium. The oxidation states −1 and −2 represented by the two reactive compounds Na_{2}[Os_{4}(CO)_{13}] and Na_{2}[Os(CO)_{4}] are used in the synthesis of osmium cluster compounds.

== Oxides ==
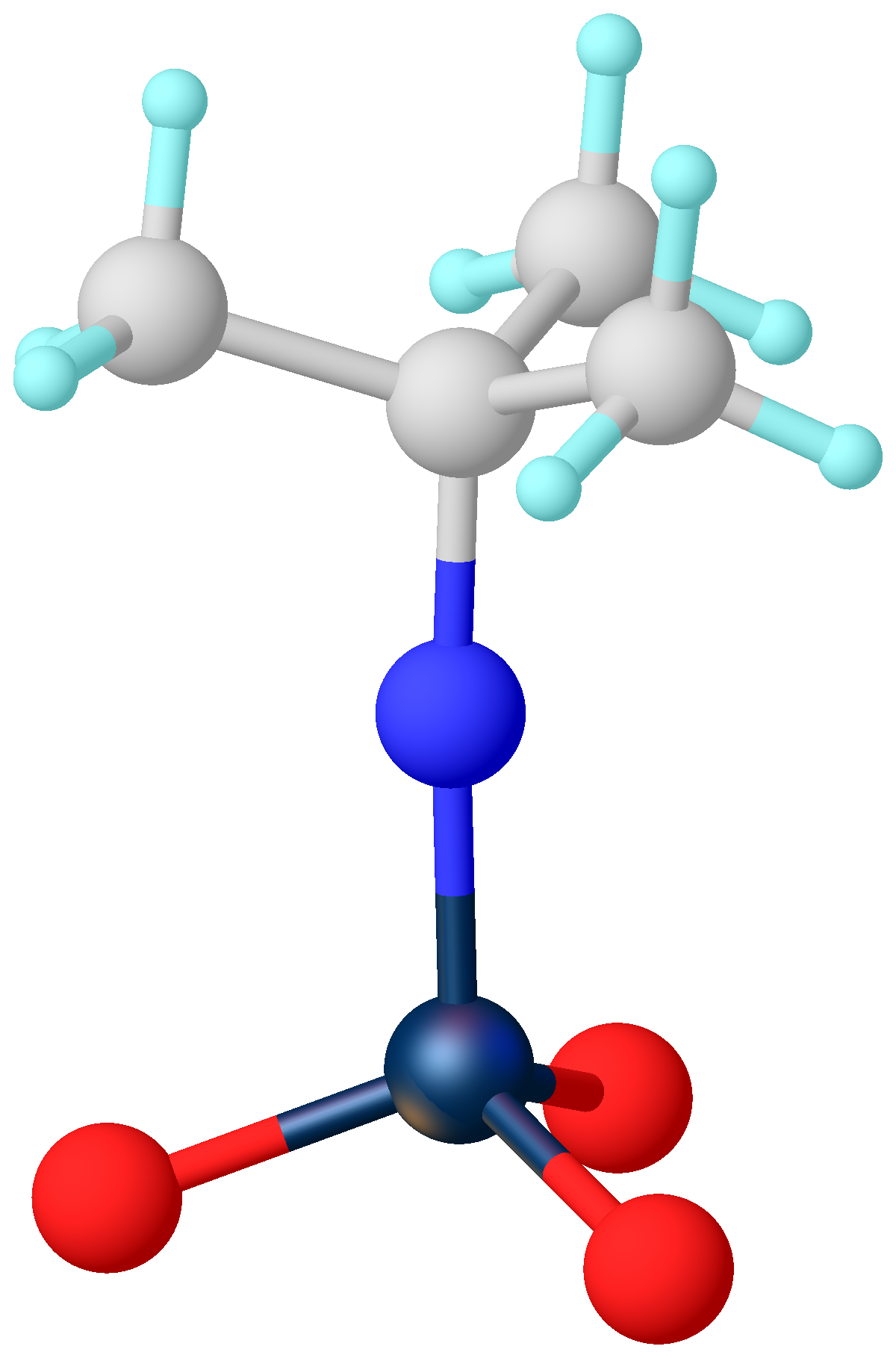
Structure of OsO_{3}(N-t-Bu) (multiple bonds are not drawn explicitly), illustrating the type of osmium(VIII)-oxo-imide that adds alkenes en route to the amino alcohol.

Osmium tetroxide is the most notable compound of osmium, having many uses. The name "osmium" even derives from Greek "ὀσμή, osme, 'smell'" because of the smell of osmium tetroxide. It also has a number of unusual properties, one being that the solid is volatile. Its volatility, along with its strong oxidizing power, is the origin of its quite serious toxicity - inhalation provides a very effective route for the compound to react with tissue. The compound is colourless, but most samples appear yellow. This is most likely due to the presence of the impurity OsO_{2}, which is yellow-brown in colour. In biology, its property of binding to lipids has made it a widely used stain in electron microscopy. OsO_{4} is formed slowly when osmium powder reacts with O_{2} at ambient temperature. Reaction of bulk solid requires heating to 400 °C.

$$\ce{Os + 2O2 ->[\Delta T] OsO4}$$

OsO_{4} is a Lewis acid and a mild oxidant. It reacts with alkaline aqueous solution to give the perosmate anion OsO_{4}(OH)^{2−}_{2}. This species is easily reduced to osmate anion, OsO_{2}(OH)^{2−}_{4}. When the Lewis base is an amine, adducts are also formed. Thus OsO_{4} can be stored in the form of osmeth, in which OsO_{4} is complexed with hexamine. Osmeth can be dissolved in tetrahydrofuran (THF) and diluted in an aqueous buffer solution to make a dilute (0.25%) working solution of OsO_{4}. With tert-BuNH_{2}, the imido derivative is produced:

$$\ce{OsO4 +  Me3CNH2 ->  OsO3(NCMe3) + H2O}$$

Similarly, with NH_{3} one obtains the nitrido complex:

$$\ce{OsO4 + NH3 + KOH -> K[Os(N)O3] + 2 H2O}$$

The [Os(N)O_{3}]^{−} anion is isoelectronic and isostructural with OsO_{4}. OsO_{4} is very soluble in tert-butyl alcohol. In solution, it is readily reduced by hydrogen to osmium metal. The suspended osmium metal can be used to catalyze hydrogenation of a wide variety of organic chemicals containing double or triple bonds.

$$\ce{OsO4 + 4 H2 -> Os  + 4 H2O}$$

OsO_{4} undergoes "reductive carbonylation" with carbon monoxide in methanol at 400 K and 200 sbar to produce the triangular cluster Os_{3}(CO)_{12}:

$\ce{3 OsO4 + 24 CO -> Os3(CO)12 + 12 CO2}$

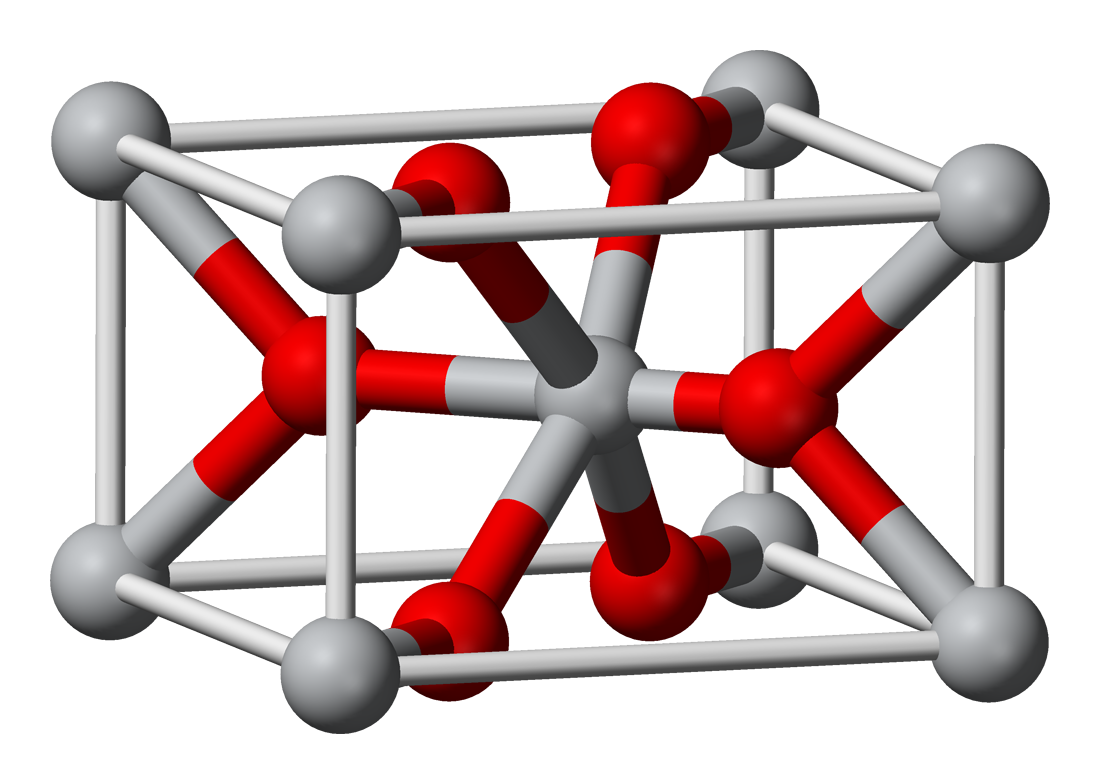
Osmium dioxide has a rutile structure.

Osmium dioxide is another known oxide of osmium, which can be obtained by the reaction of osmium with a variety of oxidizing agents, including, sodium chlorate, osmium tetroxide, and nitric oxide at about 600 °C. It does not dissolve in water, but is attacked by dilute hydrochloric acid. The crystals have rutile structure. Unlike osmium tetroxide, OsO_{2} is not toxic.

== Halides ==
=== Fluorides ===
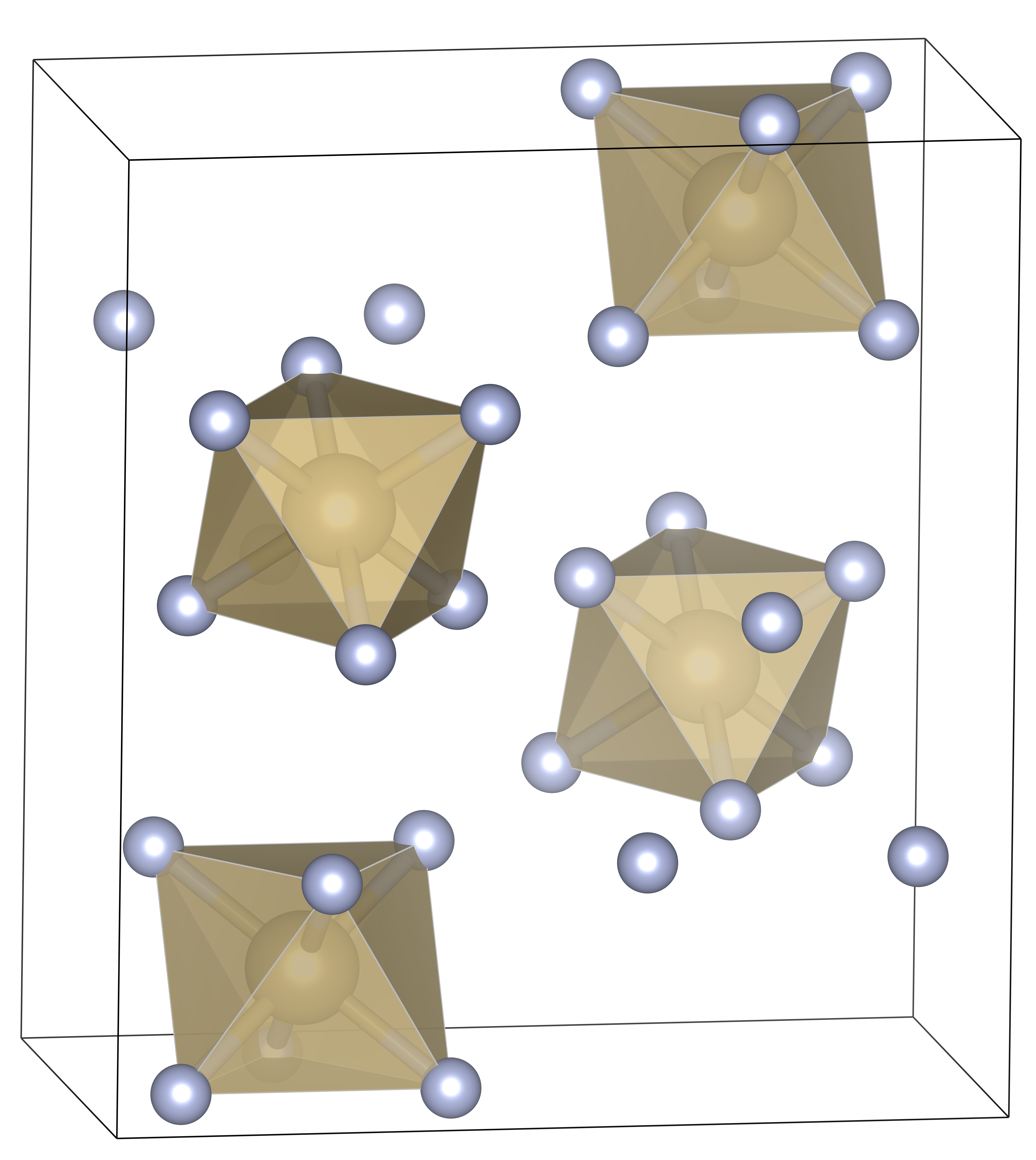
Unit cell of osmium hexafluoride.

Osmium hexafluoride is one of the 17 known binary hexafluorides, which can be made by the direct reaction of osmium metal exposed to an excess of elemental fluorine gas at 300 °C. It is a yellow crystalline solid that melts at 33.4 °C and boils at 47.5 °C. The solid structure measured at −140 °C is orthorhombic space group Pnma. Lattice parameters are a = 9.387 Å, b = 8.543 Å, and c = 4.944 Å. There are four formula units (in this case, discrete molecules) per unit cell, giving a density of 5.09 g·cm^{−3}. The OsF_{6} molecule itself (the form important for the liquid or gas phase) has octahedral molecular geometry, which has point group (O_{h}). The Os–F bond length is 1.827 Å. Partial hydrolysis of OsF_{6} produces OsOF_{4}. Osmium pentafluoride is a tetramer in the solid state that can be prepared by reduction of osmium hexafluoride with iodine as a solution in iodine pentafluoride:

$$\ce{10 OsF6 + I2 -> 10 OsF5 + 2 IF5}$$

=== Chlorides ===
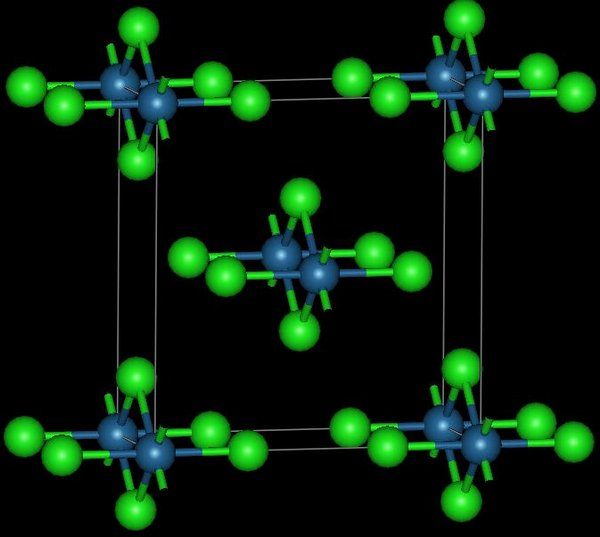
The structure of osmium tetrachloride (green = chlorine, blue = osmium

Osmium tetrachloride exists in two crystalline forms, and is used to prepare other osmium complexes. It was first reported in 1909 as the product of chlorination of osmium metal. This route affords the high temperature polymorph:

$$\ce{Os + 2 Cl2 -> OsCl4}$$

This reddish-black polymorph is orthorhombic and adopts a structure in which osmium centres are octahedrally coordinated, sharing opposite edges of the OsCl_{6} octahedra to form a chain. A brown, apparently cubic polymorph forms upon reduction of osmium tetroxide with thionyl chloride:

$$\ce{OsO4 + 4 SOCl2 -> OsCl4 + 2 Cl2 +  4 SO2}$$

Osmium tetroxide dissolves in hydrochloric acid to give the hexachloroosmate anion:

$$\ce{OsO4 + 10 HCl -> H2OsCl6 + 2 Cl2 + 4 H2O}$$

=== Bromides ===
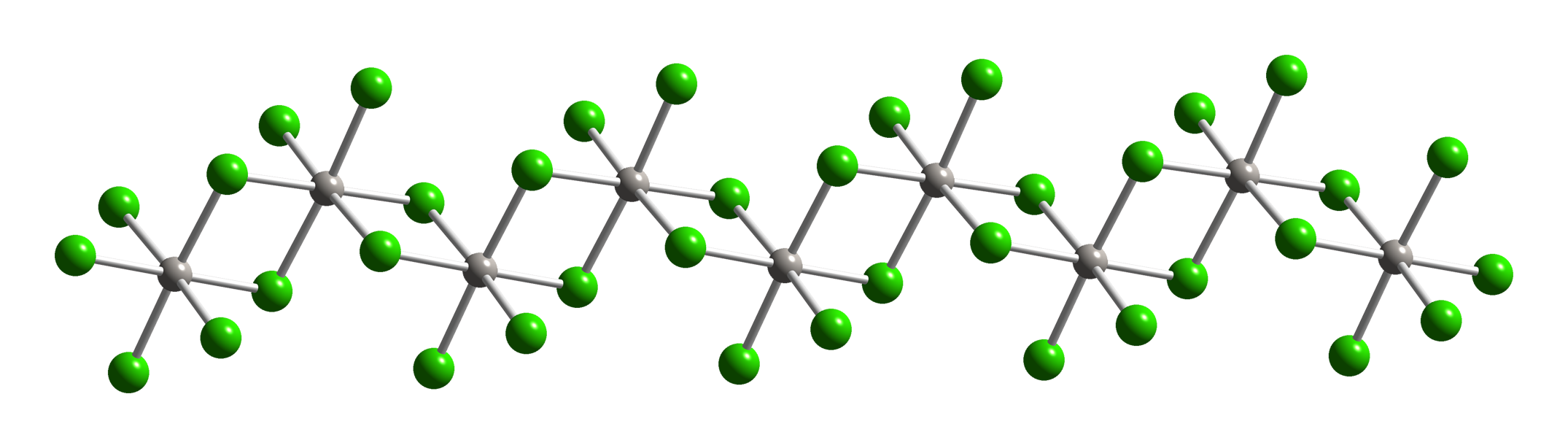
Structure of osmium tetrabromide.

Osmium tetrabromide is a black solid that can be produced by heating osmium tetrachloride and bromine under pressure. As determined by X-ray crystallography, osmium tetrabromide is an inorganic polymer. It is isomorphous with platinum tetrabromide and technetium tetrachloride. As such, osmium is in octahedral coordination. Each osmium center bonds to four doubly bridging bromide ligands and two mutually cis terminal bromide ligands. Osmium tribromide, OsBr_{3}, is the only other binary osmium bromide is that has been crystallized.

=== Iodides ===
Osmium(I) iodide is a metallic grey solid produced by the reaction of osmium tetroxide and hydroiodic acid heated in a water bath for 48 hours in a carbon dioxide atmosphere. It is an amorphous compound. Osmium(II) iodide is a black solid produced by the reaction of osmium tetroxide and hydroiodic acid at 250 °C in nitrogen:

$$\ce{OsO4 + HI -> OsI2 + H2O}$$

This compound decomposes in contact with water. Osmium(III) iodide is a black solid that is produced by heating hexaiodoosmic acid (H_{2}OsI_{6}). This compound is insoluble in water. Osmium(IV) iodide has been claimed to exist, although the supposed way to prepare it (osmic acid, OsO_{2}•2H_{2}O, with hydroiodic acid) produced dihydroxonium hexaiodoosmate instead of the tetraiodo compound, and instead contained mono, di and tri-iodo osmium compounds.

== Borides ==
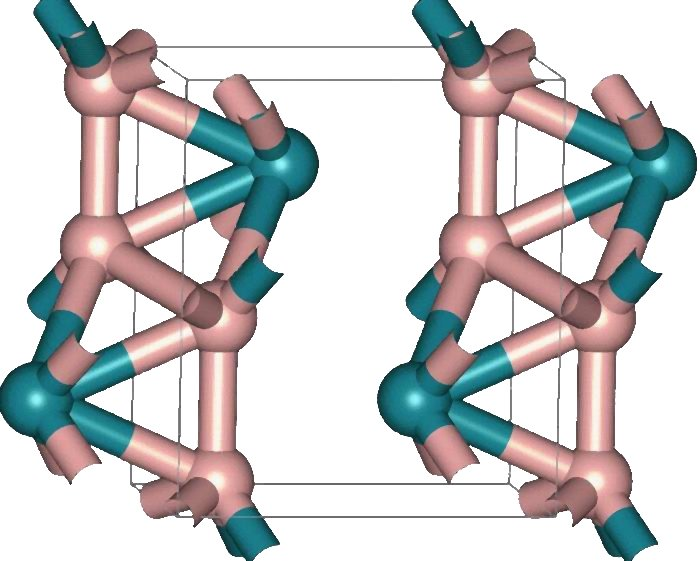
The orthorhombic structure of OsB_{2}. Here, the pink atoms denote boron atoms, and the green atoms are osmium atoms.

Osmium borides are notable for their potentially high hardness. It is thought that a combination of high electron density of osmium with the strength of boron-osmium covalent bonds will make osmium borides superhard materials, however this has not been demonstrated yet. For example, OsB_{2} is hard (hardness comparable to that of sapphire), but not superhard. These borides are produced in vacuum or inert atmosphere to prevent formation of osmium tetroxide, which is a hazardous compound. Synthesis occurs at high temperatures (~1000 °C) from a mixture of MgB_{2} and OsCl_{3}. Three osmium borides are known: OsB, Os_{2}B_{3} and OsB_{2}. The first two have hexagonal structure, similar to that of rhenium diboride. Osmium diboride was first also sought as hexagonal, but one of its phases was later reassigned to orthorhombic. In recent methods of synthesis, it has also been found that a hexagonal phase of OsB_{2} exists with a similar structure to ReB_{2}.

== Organoosmium compounds ==
In the same group 8 elements osmium resembles ruthenium in its complexes. Because Os is more expensive than Ru, the chemistry is less developed and has fewer applications. Of course the cost of the catalyst is offset if turnover numbers are high. Thus, osmium tetroxide is an important oxidizing agent in organic chemistry especially in the conversion of alkenes to 1,2-diols.

The 5d-orbitals in Os are higher in energy that the 4d-orbitals in Ru. Thus, π backbonding to alkenes and CO is stronger for Os compounds, which leads to more stable organic derivatives. This effect is illustrated by the stability of the alkene derivatives of the type [Os(NH_{3})_{5}(alkene)]^{2+} or [Os(NH_{3})_{5}(arene)]^{2+} as in the example below.

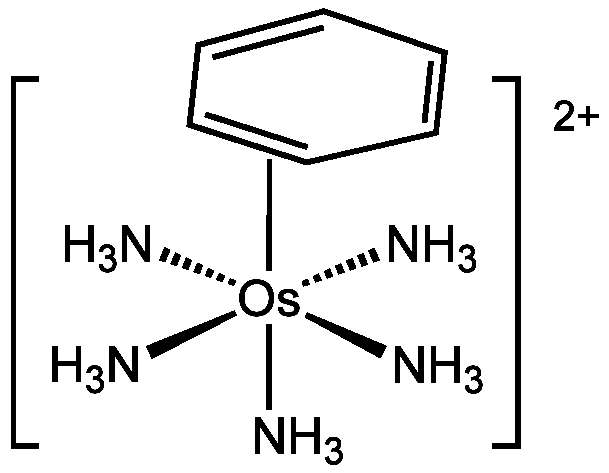

Important compounds, at least for academic studies, are the carbonyls such as triosmium dodecacarbonyl and decacarbonyldihydridotriosmium. The phosphine complexes are analogous to those or ruthenium, but hydride derivatives, e.g. OsHCl(CO)(PPh_{3})_{3}, tend to be more stable.

== See also ==
- Iron compounds
- Ruthenium compounds
- Rhenium compounds
- Iridium compounds
