= Dichloride =

Dichloride may refer to:

- Beryllium dichloride, BeCl_{2}
- Magnesium dichloride, MgCl_{2}
- Sulfur dichloride, SCl_{2}
- Calcium dichloride, CaCl_{2}
- Titanium dichloride, TiCl_{2}
- Vanadium dichloride, VCl_{2}
- Chromium dichloride, CrCl_{2}
- Manganese dichloride, MnCl_{2}
- Iron dichloride, FeCl_{2}
- Cobalt dichloride, CoCl_{2}
- Nickel dichloride, NiCl_{2}
- Copper dichloride, CuCl_{2}
- Zinc dichloride, ZnCl_{2}
- Germanium dichloride, GeCl_{2}
- Selenium dichloride, SeCl_{2}
- Strontium dichloride, SrCl_{2}
- Molybdenum dichloride, MoCl_{2}
- Ruthenium dichloride, RuCl_{2}
- Palladium dichloride, PdCl_{2}
- Tin dichloride, SnCl_{2}
- Tellurium dichloride, TeCl_{2}
- Xenon dichloride, XeCl_{2}
- Barium dichloride, BaCl_{2}
- Neodymium dichloride, NdCl_{2}
- Samarium dichloride, SmCl_{2}
- Europium dichloride, EuCl_{2}
- Dysprosium dichloride, DyCl_{2}
- Thulium dichloride, TmCl_{2}
- Ytterbium dichloride, YbCl_{2}
- Tungsten dichloride, WCl_{2}
- Osmium dichloride, OsCl_{2}
- Iridium dichloride, IrCl_{2}
- Platinum dichloride, PtCl_{2}
- Mercury dichloride, HgCl_{2}
- Lead dichloride, PbCl_{2}
- Polonium dichloride, PoCl_{2}
- Radium dichloride, RaCl_{2}
- Americium dichloride, AmCl_{2}
- Einsteinium dichloride, EsCl_{2}
