= 4CL =

4CL may refer to:

- Maserati 4CL, a pre-war Grand Prix racecar
- 4CL (PCB gongener)
- 4th-class cadet (4CL); a cadet rank in the Philippines

== See also ==
- Tetrachloride (Cl_{4})
- C4L (disambiguation)
- CL4 (disambiguation)
