= Ruthenium compounds =

Chemical compounds containing ruthenium

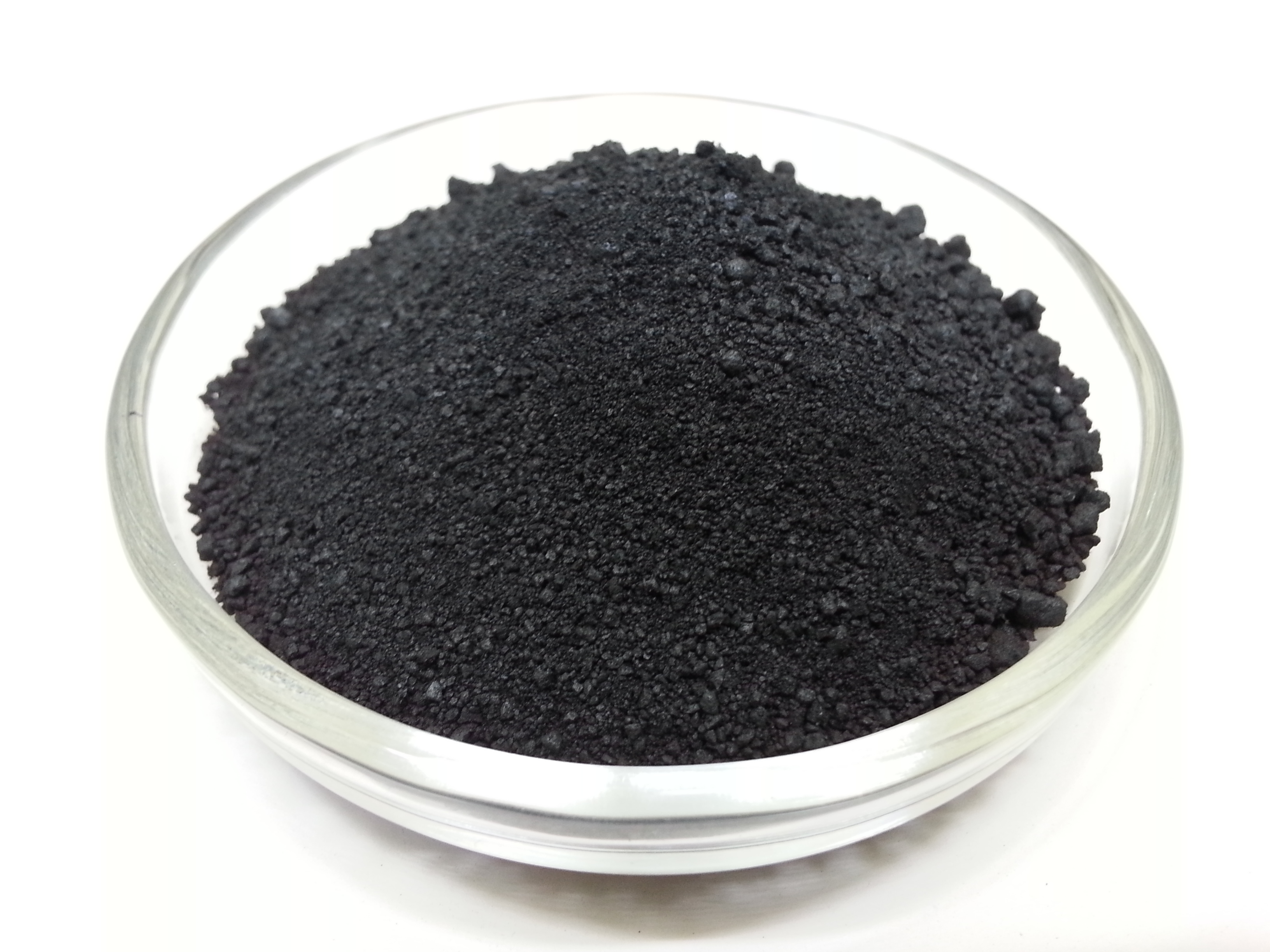
A sample of ruthenium(III) chloride, a compound of ruthenium

| Oxidation state | Representative compound |
|---|---|
| −2 | |
| −1 | |
| 0 | Ru_{3}(CO)_{12} |
| +1 | |
| +2 | RuCl_{2} |
| +3 | RuCl_{3} |
| +4 | RuO_{2}, RuCl_{4} |
| +5 | RuF_{5} |
| +6 | RuF_{6} |
| +7 | N(C_{3}H_{7})_{4}RuO_{4} |
| +8 | RuO_{4} |

Ruthenium compounds are compounds containing the element ruthenium (Ru). Ruthenium compounds can have oxidation states ranging from 0 to +8, and −2. The properties of ruthenium and osmium compounds are often similar. The +2, +3, and +4 states are the most common. The most prevalent precursor is ruthenium trichloride, a red solid that is poorly defined chemically but versatile synthetically.

== Oxides and chalcogenides ==
Ruthenium can be oxidized to ruthenium(IV) oxide (RuO_{2}, oxidation state +4), which can, in turn, be oxidized by sodium metaperiodate to the volatile yellow tetrahedral ruthenium tetroxide, RuO_{4}, an aggressive, strong oxidizing agent with structure and properties analogous to osmium tetroxide. RuO_{4} is mostly used as an intermediate in the purification of ruthenium from ores and radiowastes.

Dipotassium ruthenate (K_{2}RuO_{4}, +6) and potassium perruthenate (KRuO_{4}, +7) are also known. Unlike osmium tetroxide, ruthenium tetroxide is less stable, is strong enough as an oxidising agent to oxidise dilute hydrochloric acid and organic solvents like ethanol at room temperature, and is easily reduced to ruthenate (RuO^{2−}_{4}) in aqueous alkaline solutions; it decomposes to form the dioxide above 100 °C. Unlike iron but like osmium, ruthenium does not form oxides in its lower +2 and +3 oxidation states. Ruthenium forms dichalcogenides, which are diamagnetic semiconductors crystallizing in the pyrite structure. Ruthenium sulfide (RuS_{2}) occurs naturally as the mineral laurite.

Like iron, ruthenium does not readily form oxoanions and prefers to achieve high coordination numbers with hydroxide ions instead. Ruthenium tetroxide is reduced by cold dilute potassium hydroxide to form black potassium perruthenate, KRuO_{4}, with ruthenium in the +7 oxidation state. Potassium perruthenate can also be produced by oxidising potassium ruthenate, K_{2}RuO_{4}, with chlorine gas. The perruthenate ion is unstable and is reduced by water to form the orange ruthenate. Potassium ruthenate may be synthesized by reacting ruthenium metal with molten potassium hydroxide and potassium nitrate.

Some mixed oxides are also known, such as M^{II}Ru^{IV}O_{3}, Na_{3}Ru^{V}O_{4}, Na_{2}Ru^{V}_{2}O_{7}, and M^{II}_{2}Ln^{III}Ru^{V}O_{6}.

== Halides and oxyhalides ==
The highest known ruthenium halide is the hexafluoride, a dark brown solid that melts at 54 °C. It hydrolyzes violently upon contact with water and easily disproportionates to form a mixture of lower ruthenium fluorides, releasing fluorine gas. Ruthenium pentafluoride is a tetrameric dark green solid that is also readily hydrolyzed, melting at 86.5 °C. The yellow ruthenium tetrafluoride is probably also polymeric and can be formed by reducing the pentafluoride with iodine. Among the binary compounds of ruthenium, these high oxidation states are known only in the oxides and fluorides.

=== Trichloride ===
Ruthenium trichloride is a well-known compound, existing in a black α-form and a dark brown β-form: the trihydrate is red. Of the known trihalides, trifluoride is dark brown and decomposes above 650 °C, tribromide is dark-brown and decomposes above 400 °C, and triiodide is black. Of the dihalides, difluoride is not known, dichloride is brown, dibromide is black, and diiodide is blue. The only known oxyhalide is the pale green ruthenium(VI) oxyfluoride, RuOF_{4}.

== Coordination and organometallic complexes ==
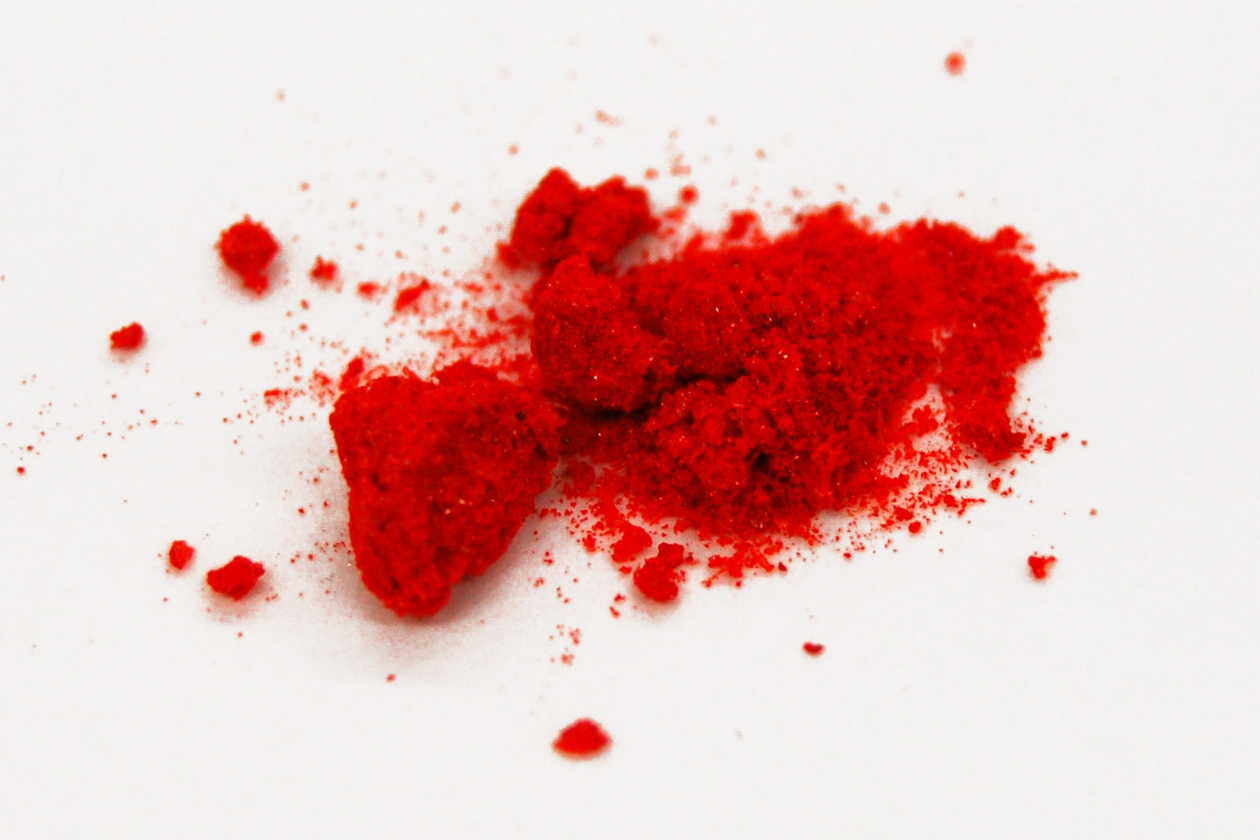
Tris(bipyridine)ruthenium(II) chloride.

Grubbs' catalyst, which earned a Nobel Prize for its inventor, is used in alkene metathesis reactions.

Ruthenium forms a variety of coordination complexes. Examples are the many pentaammine derivatives [Ru(NH_{3})_{5}L]^{n+} that often exist for both Ru(II) and Ru(III). Derivatives of bipyridine and terpyridine are numerous, best known being the luminescent tris(bipyridine)ruthenium(II) chloride.

Ruthenium forms a wide range compounds with carbon-ruthenium bonds. Grubbs' catalyst is used for alkene metathesis. Ruthenocene is analogous to ferrocene structurally, but exhibits distinctive redox properties. The colorless liquid ruthenium pentacarbonyl converts in the absence of CO pressure to the dark red solid triruthenium dodecacarbonyl. Ruthenium trichloride reacts with carbon monoxide to give many derivatives including RuHCl(CO)(PPh_{3})_{3} and Ru(CO)_{2}(PPh_{3})_{3} (Roper's complex). Heating solutions of ruthenium trichloride in alcohols with triphenylphosphine gives tris(triphenylphosphine)ruthenium dichloride (RuCl_{2}(PPh_{3})_{3}), which converts to the hydride complex chlorohydridotris(triphenylphosphine)ruthenium(II) (RuHCl(PPh_{3})_{3}).

== See also ==
- Iron compounds
- Osmium compounds
- Technetium compounds
- Rhodium compounds
- Shvo catalyst
