= Osmium bromide =

Osmium bromide may refer to:

- Osmium(IV) bromide (osmium tetrabromide), OsBr_{4}
- Osmium(III) bromide (osmium tribromide), OsBr_{3}
