= Iridium chloride =

Iridium chloride is a group of inorganic chemical compounds of iridium metal and chlorine. The term can refer to:

- Iridium(III) chloride (iridium trichloride), IrCl_{3}
- Iridium tetrachloride (iridium(IV) chloride), IrCl_{4}
- Iridium dichloride (iridium(II) chloride), IrCl_{2}
