= Osmium chloride =

Osmium chloride may refer to:

- Osmium(III) chloride, OsCl_{3}
- Osmium(IV) chloride (osmium tetrachloride), OsCl_{4}
- Osmium(V) chloride (osmium pentachloride), OsCl_{5}
