= Osmium pentacarbonyl =

Identifiers
CAS Number	16406-49-8
3D model (JSmol)	Interactive image
ChemSpider	65793451
PubChem CID	10892861
CompTox Dashboard (EPA)	DTXSID901336738
- InChI: InChI=1S/5CO.Os/c5*1-2; Key: RLUHVGZGDXPTEM-UHFFFAOYSA-N
- SMILES: C(=O)=[Os](=C=O)(=C=O)(=C=O)=C=O

Properties
Chemical formula	C_{5}O_{5}Os
Molar mass	330.28 g·mol^{−1}
Appearance	colorless liquid
Melting point	2–2.5 °C (35.6–36.5 °F; 275.1–275.6 K)
- Except where otherwise noted, data are given for materials in their standard state (at 25 °C [77 °F], 100 kPa). Infobox references

Osmium pentacarbonyl is the organoosmium compound with the formula Os(CO)_{5}. It is the simplest isolatable carbonyl complex of osmium. Osmium pentacarbonyl is a colorless volatile liquid that is obtained by treating solid triosmium dodecacarbonyl under 200 atmospheres of carbon monoxide at 280-290 °C. In contrast, also at 200 atm of CO, solid Ru_{3}(CO)_{12} converts to Ru(CO)_{5} at milder temperature of 160 °C.

== Reactions ==
Structure proposed for Os_{2}(CO)_{9}.

Samples of Os(CO)_{5} convert back to the trioosmium cluster upon heating to 80 °C. The analogous conversion of Ru(CO)_{5} back to Ru_{3}(CO)_{12} occurs at room temperature. Chlorination of the pentacarbonyl gives a cationic pentacarbonyl complex:

Os(CO)_{5} + Cl_{2} → [Os(CO)_{5}Cl]^{+}Cl^{−}

Upon UV irradiation, hexane solutions of the pentacarbonyl react with ethylene to give mono-, di-, and trisubstituted derivatives:

Os(CO)_{5} + n C_{2}H_{4} → Os(CO)_{5-n}(C_{2}H_{4})_{n} + n CO (n = 1,2,3)
