= Tetrachloride =

Tetrachloride may refer to:

- Carbon tetrachloride, CCl_{4}, also known as carbon tet
- Chromium tetrachloride, CrCl_{4}
- Germanium tetrachloride, GeCl_{4}, a colourless liquid used as an intermediate in the production of purified germanium metal
- Hafnium tetrachloride, HfCl_{4}
- Iridium tetrachloride, IrCl_{4}
- Lead tetrachloride, PbCl_{4}
- Molybdenum tetrachloride, MoCl_{4}
- Niobium tetrachloride, NbCl_{4}
- Osmium tetrachloride, OsCl_{4}
- Platinum tetrachloride, PtCl_{4}
- Polonium tetrachloride, PoCl_{4}
- Protactinium tetrachloride, PaCl_{4}
- Rhenium tetrachloride, ReCl_{4}
- Ruthenium tetrachloride, RuCl_{4}
- Rutherfordium tetrachloride, RfCl_{4}, a compound similar but more volatile to hafnium tetrachloride.
- Selenium tetrachloride, SeCl_{4}
- Silicon tetrachloride, SiCl_{4}
- Technetium tetrachloride, TcCl_{4}
- Tellurium tetrachloride, TeCl_{4}
- Tin tetrachloride, SnCl_{4}, also known as tin(IV) chloride or stannic chloride.
- Titanium tetrachloride, TiCl_{4}
- Tungsten tetrachloride, WCl_{4}
- Uranium tetrachloride, UCl_{4}, a dark green compound of uranium
- Vanadium tetrachloride, VCl_{4}, a bright red liquid and starting reagent in the preparation of vanadium compounds
- Xenon tetrachloride, XeCl_{4}
- Zirconium tetrachloride, ZrCl_{4}, an intermediate in the conversion of zirconium minerals to metallic zirconium by the Kroll process.
