= Heterogeneous water oxidation =

Water oxidation is one of the half reactions of water splitting:

2H_{2}O → O_{2} + 4H^{+} + 4e^{−} Oxidation (generation of dioxygen)

4H^{+} + 4e^{−} → 2H_{2} Reduction (generation of dihydrogen)

2H_{2}O → 2H_{2} + O_{2} Total Reaction

Of the two half reactions, the oxidation step is the most demanding because it requires the coupling of 4 electron and proton transfers and the formation of an oxygen-oxygen bond. This process occurs naturally in plants photosystem II to provide protons and electrons for the photosynthesis process and release oxygen to the atmosphere, as well as in some electrowinning processes. Since hydrogen can be used as an alternative clean burning fuel, there has been a need to split water efficiently. However, there are known materials that can mediate the reduction step efficiently therefore much of the current research is aimed at the oxidation half reaction also known as the Oxygen Evolution Reaction (OER). Current research focuses on understanding the mechanism of OER and development of new materials that catalyze the process.

== Thermodynamics ==
Both the oxidation and reduction steps are pH dependent. Reactions below show the standard potentials at pH 0 (strongly acidic) as referenced to the normal hydrogen electrode (NHE).

Oxidation 2H_{2}O → 4H^{+} + 4e^{−} + O_{2} E° = -1.23 V vs. NHE (at pH = 0)

Reduction 4H^{+} + 4e^{−} → 2H_{2} E° = 0.00 V vs. NHE (at pH = 0)

Overall 2H_{2}O → 2H_{2} + O_{2} E°cell = -1.23 V; ΔG = -475 kJ/mol

Water splitting can be done at higher pH values as well however the standard potentials will vary according to the Nernst equation and therefore shift by -59 mV for each pH unit increase. However, the total cell potential (difference between oxidation and reduction half cell potentials) will remain 1.23 V. This potential can be related to Gibbs free energy (ΔG) by:

ΔG°cell = −nFE°cell

Where n is the number of electrons per mole products and F is the Faraday constant. Therefore, it takes 475 kJ of energy to make one mole of O2 as calculated by thermodynamics. However, in reality no process can be this efficient. Systems always suffer from an overpotential that arise from activation barriers, concentration effects and voltage drops due to resistance. The activation barriers or activation energy is associated with high energy transition states that are reached during the electrochemical process of OER. The lowering of these barriers would allow for OER to occur at lower overpotentials and faster rates.

== Mechanism ==
Heterogeneous OER is sensitive to the surface in which the reaction takes place and is also affected by the pH of the solution. The general mechanism for acidic and alkaline solutions is shown below. Under acidic conditions water binds to the surface with the irreversible removal of one electron and one proton to form a platinum hydroxide. In an alkaline solution a reversible binding of hydroxide ion coupled to a one electron oxidation is thought to precede a turnover-limiting electrochemical step involving the removal of one proton and one electron to form a surface oxide species. The shift in mechanism between the pH extremes has been attributed to the kinetic facility of oxidizing hydroxide ion relative to water. Using the Tafel equation, one can obtain kinetic information about the kinetics of the electrode material such as the exchange current density and the Tafel slope. OER is presumed to not take place on clean metal surfaces such as platinum, but instead an oxide surface is formed prior to oxygen evolution.

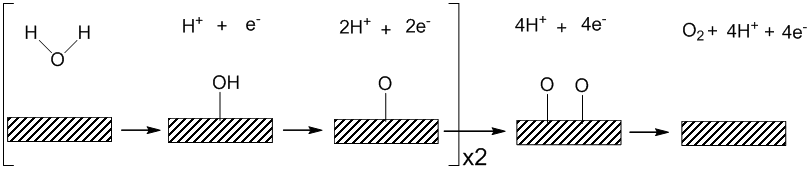
OER under acidic conditions.

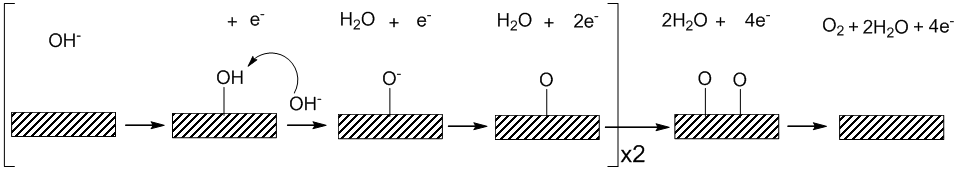
OER under alkaline conditions.

== Catalyst materials ==
OER has been studied on a variety of materials including:

- platinum surfaces
- transition metal oxides
- first-row transition metal spinels and perovskites. Recently, metal-organic framework (MOF)-based materials have been shown to be a highly promising candidate for water oxidation with first row transition metals.;

Preparation of the surface and electrolysis conditions have a large effect on reactivity (defects, steps, kinks, low coordinate sites) therefore it is difficult to predict an OER material's properties by its bulk structure. Surface effects have a large influence on the kinetics and thermodynamics of OER.

=== Platinum ===
Platinum has been a widely studied material for OER because it is the catalytically most active element for this reaction. It exhibits exchange current density values on the order of 10^{−9} A/cm^{2}. Much of the mechanistic knowledge of OER was gathered from studies on platinum and its oxides. It was observed that there was a lag in the evolution of oxygen during electrolysis. Therefore, an oxide film must first form at the surface before OER begins. The Tafel slope, which is related to the kinetics of the electrocatalytic reaction, was shown to be independent of the oxide layer thickness at low current densities but becomes dependent on oxide thickness at high current densities

=== Iridium oxide ===
Iridium oxide (IrO_{2}) is the industry standard OER catalyst used in polymer electrolyte membrane electrolysis due to its high stability. It was first proposed in the 1970s as an OER catalyst, and has been widely researched and implemented since then.

=== Ruthenium oxide ===
Ruthenium oxide (RuO_{2}) shows some of the best performance as an OER material in acidic environments. It has been studied since the early 1970s as a water oxidation catalyst with one of the lowest reported overpotentials for OER at the time. It has since been investigated for OER in Ru(110) single crystal oxide surfaces, compact films, and titanium supported films. RuO_{2} films can be prepared by thermal decomposition of ruthenium chloride on inert substrates.

=== Spinel materials ===
The spinel compounds are extremely useful in designing heterogeneous water oxidation catalysts. Generally these spinels are ofter coated over the carbon materials and reduced further to create oxygen vacancy in their lattice to enhance the water oxidation capabilities.
