= Ruthenium pentacarbonyl =

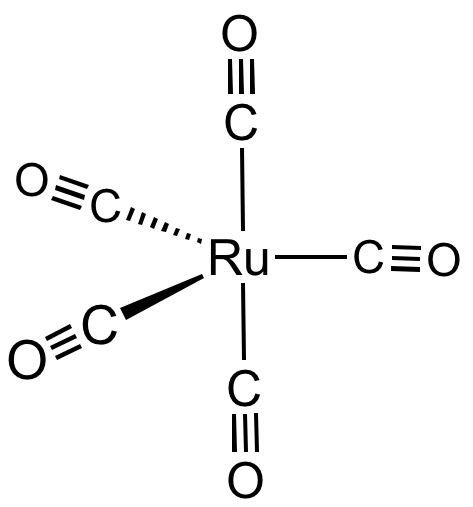

Names
- Other names Pentacarbonylruthenium

Identifiers
CAS Number	16406-48-7
3D model (JSmol)	Interactive image
ChemSpider	65793305
PubChem CID	11053793
- InChI: InChI=1S/5CO.Ru/c5*1-2; Key: UMIQWFOHGPOVPP-UHFFFAOYSA-N
- SMILES: C(=O)=[Ru](=C=O)(=C=O)(=C=O)=C=O

Properties
Chemical formula	Ru(CO)_{5}
Molar mass	241.12
Appearance	colorless liquid
Melting point	−16–17 °C (3–63 °F; 257–290 K)
- Except where otherwise noted, data are given for materials in their standard state (at 25 °C [77 °F], 100 kPa). Infobox references

Ruthenium pentacarbonyl is the ruthenium compound with the formula Ru(CO)_{5}. It is a colorless, light-sensitive liquid that readily decarbonylates upon standing at room temperature. It is of academic interest as an intermediate for the synthesis of metal carbonyl complexes.

== Preparation ==
Ru(CO)_{5} was originally prepared by carbonylation of ruthenium salts in the presence of a reducing agent. A more recent preparation involves photolysis of triruthenium dodecacarbonyl in the presence of carbon monoxide:

Ru_{3}(CO)_{12} + 3 CO ⇌ 3 Ru(CO)_{5}

It is characterized by two intense ν_{CO} bands in the IR spectrum at 2038 and 2003 cm^{−1} (hexane solution).

== Comparisons of M(CO)_{5} (M = Fe, Ru, Os) ==
Whereas Fe(CO)_{5} is completely robust at room temperature, samples of Ru(CO)_{5} are typically reddish owing to contamination by Ru_{3}(CO)_{12}. The conversion is rapid in solution. Os(CO)_{5} requires heating to 80 °C to effect conversion to triosmium dodecacarbonyl.
