= Ruthenium chloride =

There are several ruthenium chlorides:

- Ruthenium(II) chloride, a brown salt
- Ruthenium(III) chloride, a black salt and the most common ruthenium chloride
- Ruthenium tetrachloride, a volatile compound decomposing at -30 °C
