= Tricarbonylchloroglycinatoruthenium(II) =

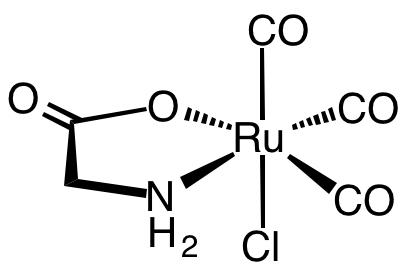

Names
- Other names CORM-3

Identifiers
CAS Number	475473-26-8
3D model (JSmol)	Interactive image
ChemSpider	77485395
PubChem CID	91886169
- InChI: InChI=1S/C2H5NO2.3CO.ClH.Ru/c3-1-2(4)5;3*1-2;;/h1,3H2,(H,4,5);;;;1H;/q;;;;;+1/p-1 Key: ZOINYBNDJAUNGD-UHFFFAOYSA-M
- SMILES: [C-]#[O+].[C-]#[O+].[C-]#[O+].C(C(=O)O)N.Cl[Ru]

Properties
Chemical formula	C_{5}H_{4}ClNO_{5}Ru
Molar mass	294.61 g·mol^{−1}
Appearance	yellow solid
- Except where otherwise noted, data are given for materials in their standard state (at 25 °C [77 °F], 100 kPa). Infobox references

Tricarbonylchloroglycinatoruthenium(II) is an organoruthenium complex with the formula RuCl(H_{2}NCH_{2}CO_{2})(CO)_{3}. A yellow solid, it is an amino acid complex consisting of an octahedral complex with three carbonyls, chloride, and bidentate glycinate ligands. The CO ligands are arranged in a facial geometry. The complex is prepared by treating dichlororuthenium tricarbonyl dimer with sodium glycinate. The complex has attracted attention as a CO-releasing molecule ("CORM").
