= CL4 =

CL4, CL-4 or CL.IV may refer to:

- Canadair CL-4 North Star Mk.1
- Halberstadt CL.IV, a German ground attack aircraft of World War I
- Hannover CL.IV, a prototype escort fighter built in Germany during World War I
- USS Omaha (CL-4), the lead ship of Omaha class of light cruiser of the United States Navy
- USS Little Rock (CL-4), a Cleveland-class light cruiser of the United States Navy
- Tetrachloride (Cl_{4})

== See also ==
- 1989 CL4, a synonym for 9911 Quantz, a main belt asteroid orbiting the Sun
- C4L (disambiguation)
- CL (disambiguation)
