= Dichlororuthenium tricarbonyl dimer =

Names
- Other names hexacarbonyldi-μ-chlorodichlorodiruthenium

Identifiers
CAS Number	22594-69-0
3D model (JSmol)	Interactive image
ChemSpider	21171219
ECHA InfoCard	100.159.029
EC Number	630-725-3
PubChem CID	10951331
CompTox Dashboard (EPA)	DTXSID60449451
- InChI: InChI=1S/6CO.4ClH.2Ru/c6*1-2;;;;;;/h;;;;;;4*1H;;/q;;;;;;;;;;2*+2/p-4 Key: JYHHJVKGDCZCCL-UHFFFAOYSA-J
- SMILES: O#C[Ru+2]1([Cl-])(C#O)(C#O)[Cl-][Ru+2]([Cl-])(C#O)(C#O)(C#O)[Cl-]1

Properties
Chemical formula	C_{6}Cl_{4}O_{6}Ru_{2}
Molar mass	512.00 g·mol^{−1}

Hazards
- GHS labelling
Pictograms	(GHS07: Exclamation mark)
Signal word	Warning
Hazard statements	H302, H312, H315, H319, H332, H335
Precautionary statements	P261, P264, P264+P265, P270, P271, P280, P301+P317, P302+P352, P304+P340, P305+P351+P338, P317, P319, P321, P330, P332+P317, P337+P317, P362+P364, P403+P233, P405, P501
- Except where otherwise noted, data are given for materials in their standard state (at 25 °C [77 °F], 100 kPa). Infobox references

Dichlororuthenium tricarbonyl dimer is an organoruthenium compound with the formula [RuCl_{2}(CO)_{3}]_{2}. A yellow solid, the molecule features a pair of octahedral Ru centers bridged by a pair of chloride ligands. The complex is a common starting material in ruthenium chemistry.

== Synthesis and reactions ==
Dichlororuthenium tricarbonyl dimer arises by the carbonylation of a hot solution of ruthenium trichloride in methoxyethanol.

The complex exists in equilibrium with the polymer:

n [RuCl_{2}(CO)_{3}]_{2} → [RuCl_{2}(CO)_{2}]_{2n} + 2 CO

It reacts with potassium hydroxide in alcohol to give triruthenium dodecacarbonyl.

Dichlororuthenium tricarbonyl dimer reacts with glycine to give tricarbonylchloroglycinatoruthenium(II).
