= Osmium oxide pentafluoride =

Names
- Other names Osmium oxypentafluoride

Identifiers
3D model (JSmol)	Interactive image
- InChI: InChI=1S/5FH.O.Os/h5*1H;;/q;;;;;;+5/p-5 Key: KMJGCQQKIWSRQV-UHFFFAOYSA-I
- SMILES: F[Os](F)(F)(F)(F)=O

Properties
Chemical formula	OsOF_{5}
Molar mass	301.22 g·mol^{−1}
Appearance	emerald green solid
Melting point	59.2 °C (138.6 °F; 332.3 K)
Boiling point	100.6 °C (213.1 °F; 373.8 K)
Vapor pressure	41.1 mmHg (304.8 K)
Magnetic susceptibility (χ)	917×10^{−6} cm^{3}/mol (293.8 K)

Structure
Crystal structure	Orthorhombic
Space group	Pnma
Lattice constant	a = 9.540 Å, b = 8.669 Å, c = 5.019 Å
Lattice volume (V)	415.1 Å^{3}
Formula units (Z)	4 units per cell

Thermochemistry
Enthalpy of fusion (Δ_{f}H^{⦵}_{fus})	1.62 kcal/mol
Enthalpy of vaporization (Δ_{f}H_{vap})	8.75 kcal/mol
Enthalpy of sublimation (Δ_{f}H_{sublim})	10.37 kcal/mol
- Except where otherwise noted, data are given for materials in their standard state (at 25 °C [77 °F], 100 kPa). Infobox references

Osmium oxide pentafluoride is an inorganic compound with the chemical formula OsOF_{5}. It is a paramagnetic emerald green solid, notable for being a heptavalent osmium compound stable in molecular form under normal temperature and pressure.

== Structure ==
It is dimorphic, forming orthorhombic crystals and transitioning to a cubic disordered phase at 32.5 °C. OsOF_{5}, in its high temperature form, is indistinguishable crystallographically from OsF_{6}.

== Preparation ==
Osmium oxide pentafluoride can be prepared in several ways.

=== From elements ===
It can be prepared by heating osmium metal in a stream of oxygen and fluorine (1:2 v/v). The reaction is self-sustaining after initiation by heat. The resulting product mixture is captured in a cold trap and the osmium hexafluoride byproduct is separated by difference in volatility. The yield is reported to be 50%.

=== Fluorination of osmium dioxide ===
Anhydrous osmium dioxide is reacted with a slight excess of fluorine in a closed monel can. The product is separated from the osmium hexafluoride byproduct using the aforementioned technique with a yield of over 90%.

2 OsO_{2} + 5 F_{2} → 2 OsOF_{5} + O_{2}

=== Other fluorinating agents ===
OsO_{2} is fluorinated to OsOF_{5} by ClF_{3} with quantitative yields at ambient temperature.

OsO_{4} is fluorinated into a mixture of OsO_{3}F_{2} and OsOF_{5} by ClF_{3} at ambient temperature. The formation of OsOF_{5} corresponds to a reduction of osmium from +8 to +7.

== Related compounds ==
Other oxide fluorides of osmium are known including: OsO_{3}F_{2}, OsO_{2}F_{3}, and OsOF_{4}. There is some evidence for the existence of OsO_{2}F_{2}.
