= C41 =

C41 or C-41 may be:

== Vehicles ==
- C-41 (rocket), an Italian sounding rocket
- Alfa Romeo Racing C41, an Italian Formula One car
- CASA C-41, a Spanish light transport aircraft in use by the United States Armed Forces
- Canadair C-4-1 Argonaut
- Citroën C41, a French sedan
- Courage C41, a French racing car
- Douglas C-41, an American military transport aircraft
- Unterseeboot C-41, a German WW1 submarine

== Places ==
- C41 road (Namibia)
- Caldwell 41, the Hyades star cluster

== Other uses ==
- C-41 process, for developing colour negative film
- Bone tumor (disease code C41)
- Philidor Defence (C41), a chess opening

== See also ==
- GE C41-8W diesel-electric locomotive
- GE C41-8 diesel-electric locomotive
- C4I
- C4L (disambiguation)
