= C4L =

C4L may refer to:

- Campaign for Liberty, a U.S. political organization founded by Ron Paul
- Citroën C4L, a French saloon car

== See also ==
- C4I
- C41 (disambiguation)
- CL4 (disambiguation)
