= Decacarbonyldihydridotriosmium =

Names
- IUPAC names Decacarbonyldihydridotriosmium, Decacarbonyl-1κ^{3}C,2κ^{3}C,3κ^{4}C-di-μ-hydrido-1:2κ^{2}H;1:2κ^{2}H-triangulo-triosmium(3 Os—Os)

Identifiers
CAS Number	41766-80-7
3D model (JSmol)	Interactive image
PubChem CID	139143320
- InChI: InChI=1S/10CO.3Os.2H/c10*1-2;;;;;/q;;;;;;;;;;;2*+1;2*-1 Key: ABHQEXNWCLZGFV-UHFFFAOYSA-N
- SMILES: [H-].[H-].[C-]#[O+].[C-]#[O+].[C-]#[O+].[C-]#[O+].[C-]#[O+].[C-]#[O+].[C-]#[O+].[C-]#[O+].[C-]#[O+].[C-]#[O+].[Os].[Os+].[Os+]

Properties
Chemical formula	H_{2}Os_{3}(CO)_{10}
Molar mass	852.81 g/mol
Appearance	Deep purple-violet crystals
Density	3.48 g/cm3
Boiling point	decomposes
Solubility in water	insoluble
Solubility in other solvents	reacts with Chlorocarbons

Structure
Coordination geometry	triangular cluster

Hazards
- Occupational safety and health (OHS/OSH)
Main hazards	Toxic

Related compounds
Related compounds	Os_{3}(CO)_{12}
- Except where otherwise noted, data are given for materials in their standard state (at 25 °C [77 °F], 100 kPa). verify (what is ?) Infobox references

Decacarbonyldihydridotriosmium is an organoosmium compound with the formula H_{2}Os_{3}(CO)_{10}. This purple-violet crystalline air-stable cluster is noteworthy because it is electron-deficient and hence adds a variety of substrates.

== Structure and synthesis ==
The trinuclear cluster features an isosceles triangular array of metals with one short edge (r_{Os-Os} = 2.68 Å), which is spanned by the two hydride ligands, and two longer edges (r_{Os-Os} = 2.81 Å). It can be described as Os(CO)_{4}[Os(CO)_{3}(μ-H)]_{2}. The bonding in the Os_{2}H_{2} subunit has been compared to the 3-center, 2e bonding in diborane. The molecule forms a variety of adducts with loss of H_{2}.

It is prepared by purging a solution of Os_{3}(CO)_{12} in octane (or other inert solvent of similar boiling point) with H_{2}.

Os_{3}(CO)_{12} + H_{2} → Os_{3}H_{2}(CO)_{10} + 2 CO

== Reactions ==
The cluster reacts with a wide range of reagents under mild conditions. Illustrative is its reaction with diazomethane to give Os_{3}(CO)_{10}(μ-H)(μ-CH_{3}), exhibiting an agostic interaction, the first identified in a metal cluster.
