= Ruthenium(II) chloride =

Names
- Other names: Ruthenium dichloride; Dichlororuthenium

Identifiers
| CAS Number | 13465-51-5 |
| 3D model (JSmol) | Interactive image |
| ChemSpider | 132403 |
| PubChem CID | 150195 |
- InChI: InChI=1S/2ClH.Ru/h2*1H;/q;;+2/p-2 Key: DHCWLIOIJZJFJE-UHFFFAOYSA-L
- SMILES: Cl[Ru]Cl

Properties
| Chemical formula | Cl_{2}Ru |
| Molar mass | 171.97 g·mol^{−1} |
| Appearance | brown crystals |
| Solubility in water | poorly soluble |
| Solubility | soluble in ethanol |

Related compounds
| Related compounds | Osmium(II) chloride; Iridium(II) chloride; Platinum(II) chloride |
- Except where otherwise noted, data are given for materials in their standard state (at 25 °C [77 °F], 100 kPa). Infobox references

Ruthenium(II) chloride is an inorganic compound with the chemical formula RuCl_{2}. It forms a deep blue solution.

== Synthesis ==
Ruthenium(II) chloride can be prepared by reacting ruthenium metal with dry chlorine at 250 °C:

Ru + Cl_{2} → RuCl_{2}

It can also be prepared by treating a ruthenium trichloride solution with hydrogen in the presence of platinum black:

2RuCl_{3} + H_{2} → 2RuCl_{2} + 2HCl

== Reactions ==
Ruthenium(II) chloride forms complexes with aromatic hydrocarbons.

The compound can be reduced to elemental ruthenium by hydrogen.
