= Iridium(II) chloride =

Names
- Other names: Iridium dichloride; Iridium bichloride

Identifiers
3D model (JSmol)	Interactive image
- InChI: InChI=1S/2ClH.Ir/h2*1H;/q;;+2/p-2 Key: BBVIQHLJRNEBBW-UHFFFAOYSA-L
- SMILES: [Ir+2].[Cl-].[Cl-]

Properties
Chemical formula	Cl_{2}Ir
Molar mass	263.12 g·mol^{−1}
Appearance	dark-green crystals
Melting point	773 °C (1,423 °F; 1,046 K) (decomposes)
Solubility in water	practically insoluble
Solubility	poorly soluble in acids and alkalis

Thermochemistry
Gibbs free energy (Δ_{f}G^{⦵})	-139.7 kJ/mol

Related compounds
Related compounds	Osmium(II) chloride
- Except where otherwise noted, data are given for materials in their standard state (at 25 °C [77 °F], 100 kPa). Infobox references

Iridium(II) chloride is an inorganic compound of iridium and chlorine with the chemical formula IrCl_{2}. It is a dark green solid.

== Synthesis ==
Iridium(II) chloride can be obtained by the interaction of powdered metallic iridium with chlorine gas when heated:

Ir + Cl_{2} → IrCl_{2}

Iridium(II) chloride is also formed in the reduction of iridium(III) chloride with metallic iridium:

2IrCl_{3} + Ir → 3IrCl_{2}

== Chemical properties ==
It decomposes when heated to 773 °C :

2IrCl_{2} → 2IrCl + Cl_{2}

At temperatures above 798 °C, complete decomposition of the substance occurs:

IrCl_{2} → Ir + Cl_{2}
