= Osmium hexafluoride =

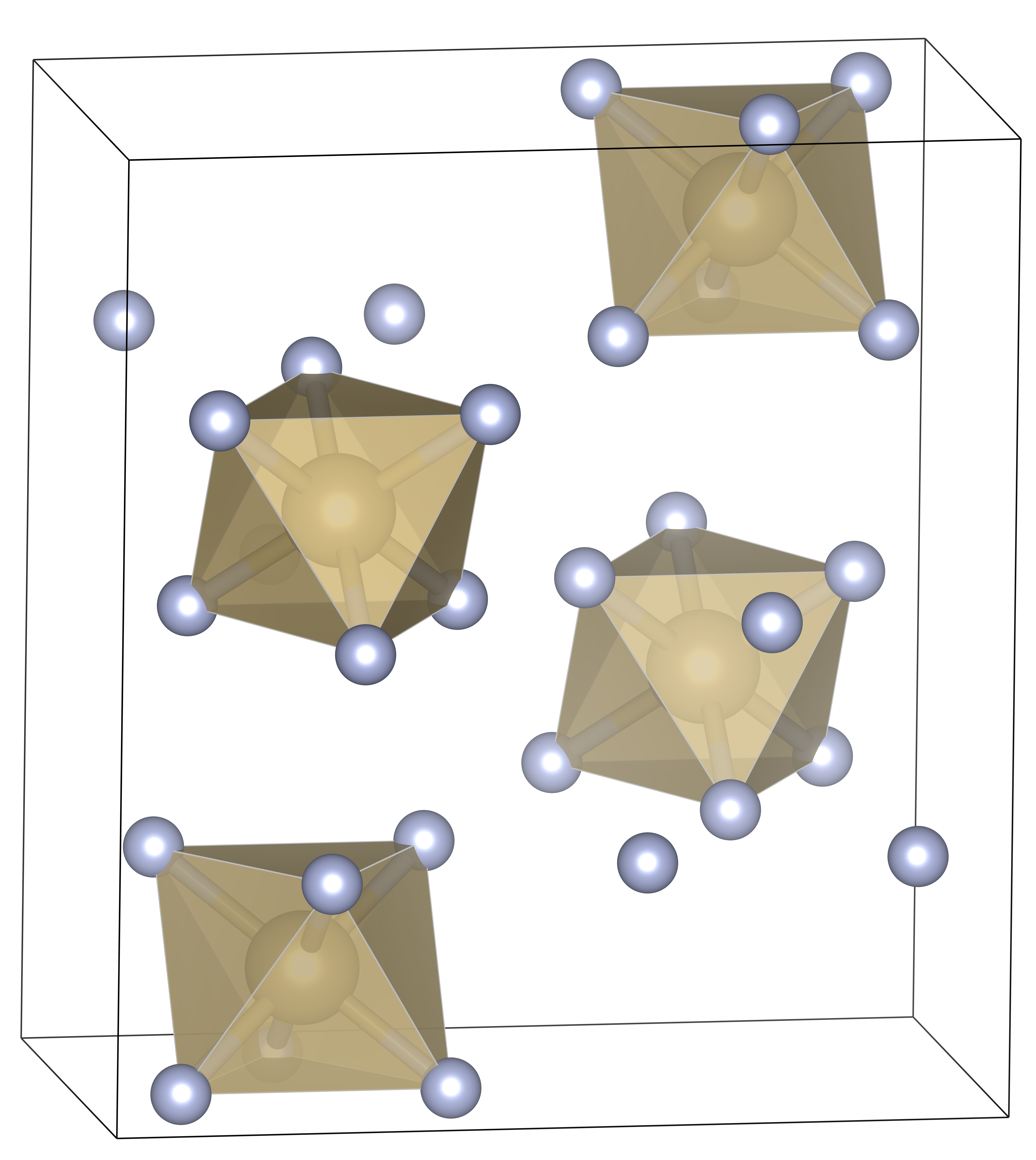
- Unit cell of osmium hexafluoride.

Names
- IUPAC name osmium(VI) fluoride
- Other names osmium hexafluoride

Identifiers
CAS Number	13768-38-2
3D model (JSmol)	Interactive image
ChemSpider	109930
ECHA InfoCard	100.033.969
PubChem CID	123327
UNII	1G36E253R5
CompTox Dashboard (EPA)	DTXSID50160269
- InChI: InChI=1S/6FH.Os/h6*1H;/q;;;;;;+6/p-6 Key: MLKFZZUUYQWFMO-UHFFFAOYSA-H; InChI=1/6FH.Os/h6*1H;/q;;;;;;+6/p-6/rF6Os/c1-7(2,3,4,5)6 Key: MLKFZZUUYQWFMO-ZXTFGAQLAX
- SMILES: F[Os](F)(F)(F)(F)F

Properties
Chemical formula	OsF_{6}
Molar mass	304.22 g/mol
Appearance	yellow crystalline solid
Density	5.09 g/mL
Melting point	33.4 °C (92.1 °F; 306.5 K)
Boiling point	47.5 °C (117.5 °F; 320.6 K)

Structure
Space group	Pnma, No. 62
Lattice constant	a = 938.7 pm, b = 854.3 pm, c = 494.4 pm
- Except where otherwise noted, data are given for materials in their standard state (at 25 °C [77 °F], 100 kPa). Infobox references

Osmium hexafluoride, also osmium(VI) fluoride, (OsF_{6}) is a compound of osmium and fluorine, and one of the seventeen known binary hexafluorides.

== Synthesis ==
Osmium hexafluoride is made by a direct reaction of osmium metal exposed to an excess of elemental fluorine gas at 300 °C.

Os + 3 F_{2} → OsF_{6}

== Description ==
Osmium hexafluoride is a yellow crystalline solid that melts at 33.4 °C and boils at 47.5 °C. The solid structure measured at −140 °C is orthorhombic space group Pnma. Lattice parameters are a = 9.387 Å, b = 8.543 Å, and c = 4.944 Å. There are four formula units (in this case, discrete molecules) per unit cell, giving a density of 5.09 g·cm^{−3}.

The OsF_{6} molecule itself (the form important for the liquid or gas phase) has octahedral molecular geometry, which has point group (O_{h}). The Os–F bond length is 1.827 Å.

Partial hydrolysis of OsF_{6} produces OsOF_{4}.
