= Osmium tetrabromide =

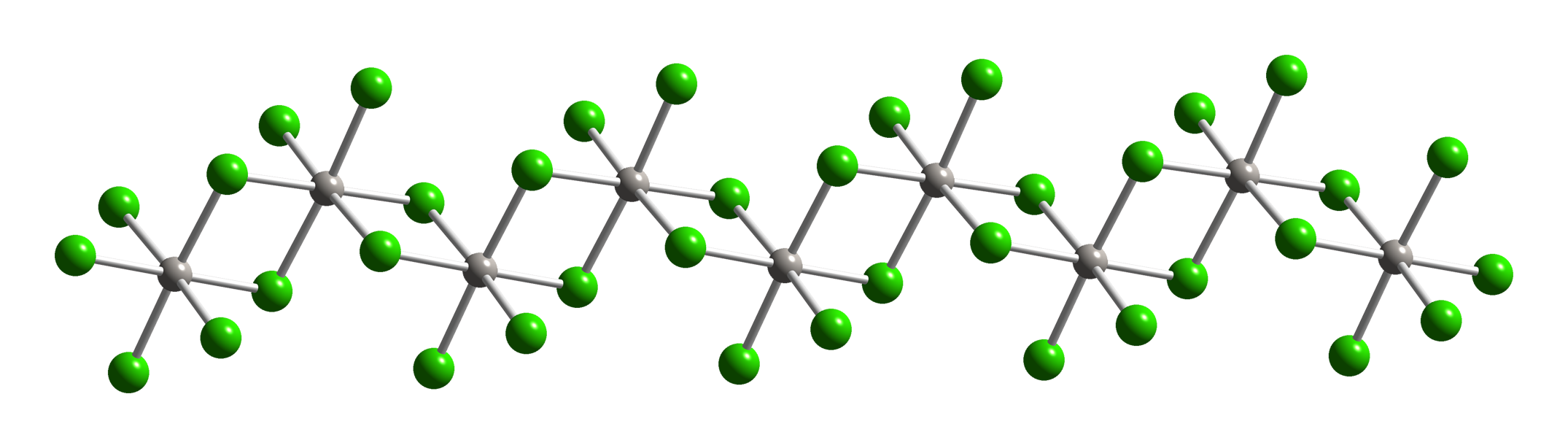

Names
- Other names osmium(IV) bromide

Identifiers
CAS Number	59201-52-4
3D model (JSmol)	Interactive image
ChemSpider	21494153
PubChem CID	101978335
- InChI: InChI=1S/4BrH.Os/h4*1H;/q;;;;+4/p-4 Key: MPVSPHKBQDMOHE-UHFFFAOYSA-J
- SMILES: [Br-].[Br-].[Br-].[Br-].[Os+4]

Properties
Chemical formula	OsBr_{4}
Molar mass	509.85 g·mol^{−1}
Appearance	black solid
Density	5.95 g/cm^{3}

Structure
Crystal structure	Orthorhombic
Space group	Pbca (No. 61)
Lattice constant	a = 633.99 pm, b = 1210.92 pm, c = 1461.5 pm
Formula units (Z)	8 units per cell
- Except where otherwise noted, data are given for materials in their standard state (at 25 °C [77 °F], 100 kPa). Infobox references

Osmium tetrabromide is the inorganic compound with the formula OsBr_{4}. A black solid, this compound can be produced by heating osmium tetrachloride and bromine under pressure.

== Structure ==
As determined by X-ray crystallography, osmium tetrabromide is an inorganic polymer. It is isomorphous with platinum tetrabromide and technetium tetrachloride. As such, osmium is in octahedral coordination. Each osmium center bonds to four doubly bridging bromide ligands and two mutually cis terminal bromide ligands.

== Related compounds ==
OsBr_{3} is the only other binary osmium bromide is that has been crystallized.
