= Triosmium dodecacarbonyl =

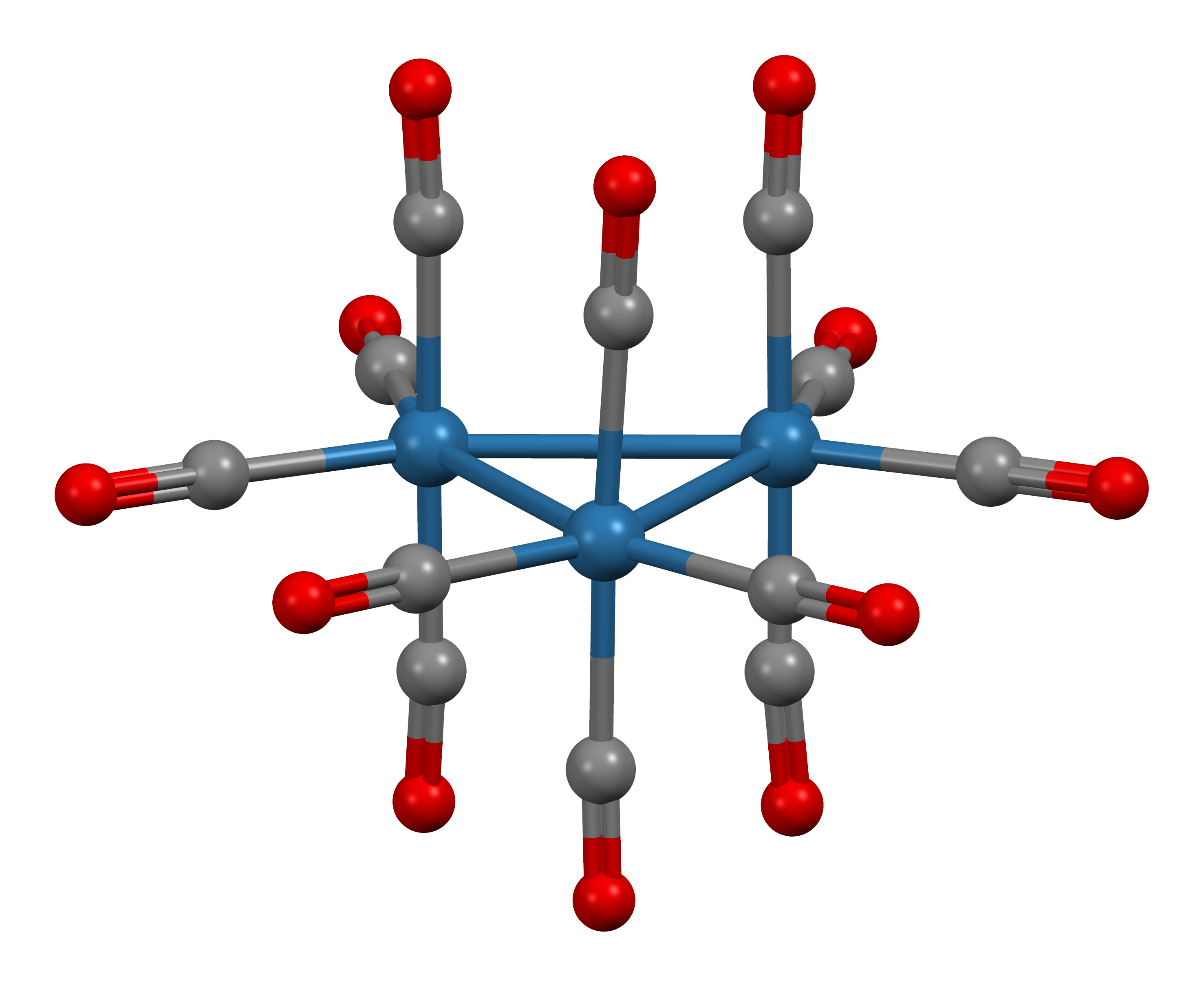

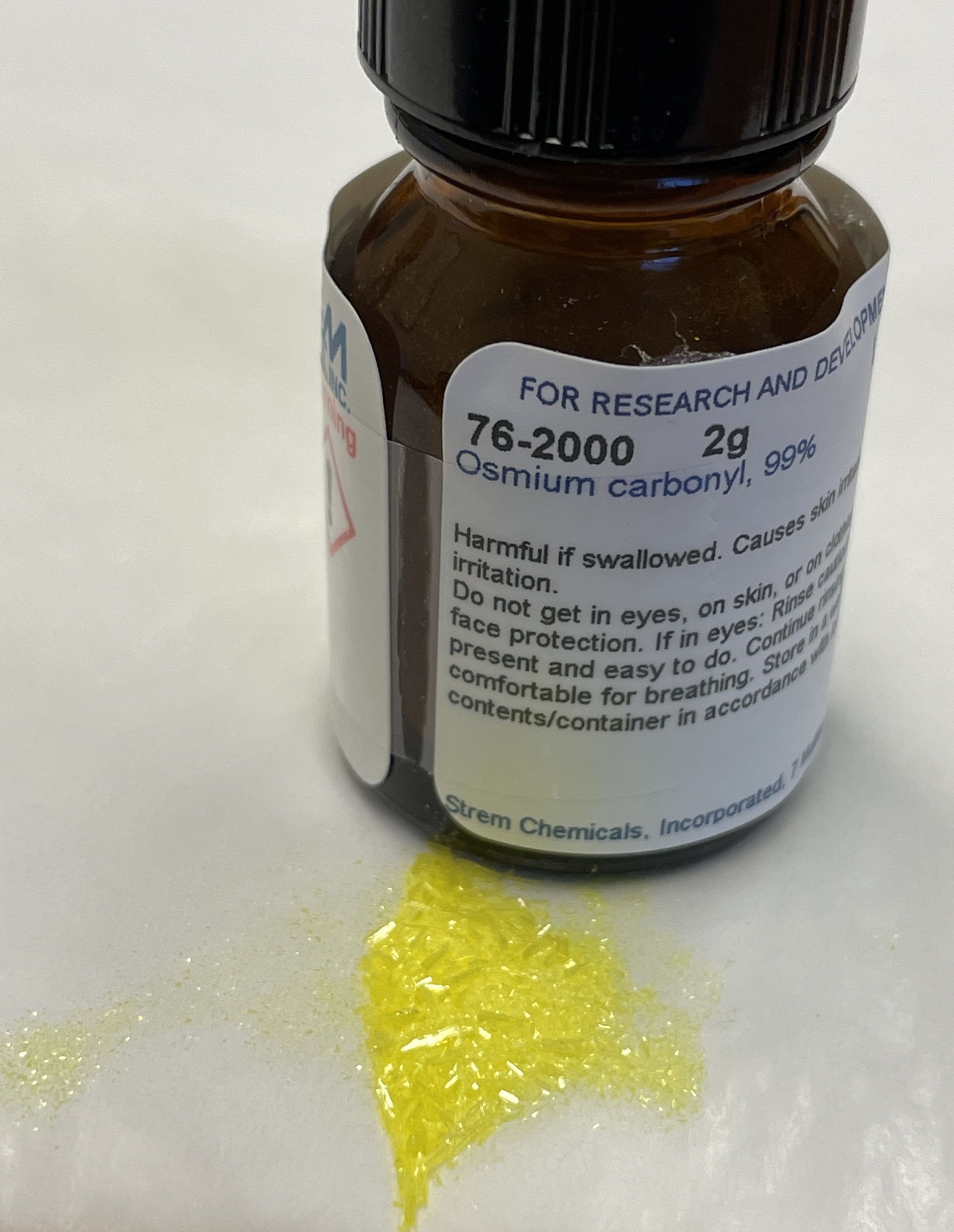

Names
- IUPAC name cyclo-tris(tetracarbonylosmium)(3 Os—Os)
- Other names Osmium carbonyl

Identifiers
CAS Number	15696-40-9
3D model (JSmol)	Interactive image
ChemSpider	452847
ECHA InfoCard	100.036.157
PubChem CID	6096995
CompTox Dashboard (EPA)	DTXSID50166160
- InChI: InChI=1S/12CO.3Os/c12*1-2;;; Key: VUBLMKVEIPBYME-UHFFFAOYSA-N
- SMILES: [C-]#[O+].[C-]#[O+].[C-]#[O+].[C-]#[O+].[C-]#[O+].[C-]#[O+].[C-]#[O+].[C-]#[O+].[C-]#[O+].[C-]#[O+].[C-]#[O+].[C-]#[O+].[Os].[Os].[Os]

Properties
Chemical formula	C_{12}O_{12}Os_{3}
Molar mass	906.81 g/mol
Appearance	yellow solid
Density	3.48 g/cm^{3}
Melting point	224 °C (435 °F; 497 K)
Boiling point	sublimes in vacuum
Solubility in water	insoluble
Solubility in other solvents	slightly in organic solvents

Structure
Dipole moment	0 D (0 C·m)

Hazards
- Occupational safety and health (OHS/OSH)
Main hazards	CO source
- GHS labelling
Pictograms	(GHS06: Toxic) (GHS07: Exclamation mark)
Signal word	Danger
Hazard statements	H301, H302, H315, H319, H330, H335
Precautionary statements	P261, P264, P270, P271, P280, P301+P312, P302+P352, P304+P340, P305+P351+P338, P312, P321, P330, P332+P313, P337+P313, P362, P403+P233, P405, P501

Related compounds
Related compounds	Fe_{3}(CO)_{12} Ru_{3}(CO)_{12} Decacarbonyldihydridotriosmium
- Except where otherwise noted, data are given for materials in their standard state (at 25 °C [77 °F], 100 kPa). verify (what is ?) Infobox references

Triosmium dodecacarbonyl is a chemical compound with the formula Os_{3}(CO)_{12}. This yellow-colored metal carbonyl cluster is an important precursor to organo-osmium compounds. Many of the advances in cluster chemistry have arisen from studies on derivatives of Os_{3}(CO)_{12} and its lighter analogue Ru_{3}(CO)_{12}.

== Structure and synthesis ==
The cluster has D_{3h} symmetry, consisting of an equilateral triangle of Os atoms, each of which bears two axial and two equatorial CO ligands. Each of the three osmium centers has an octahedral structure with four CO ligands and the other two osmium atoms.

The Os–Os bond distance is 2.88 Å (288 pm). Ru_{3}(CO)_{12} has the same structure, whereas Fe_{3}(CO)_{12} is different, with two bridging CO ligands resulting in C_{2v} symmetry. In solution, Os_{3}(CO)_{12} is fluxional as indicated by ^{13}C NMR measurements. The barrier is estimated at 70 kJ/mol

Os_{3}(CO)_{12} is prepared by the direct reaction of OsO_{4} with carbon monoxide at 175 °C under high pressures:

3 OsO_{4} + 24 CO → Os_{3}(CO)_{12} + 12 CO_{2}

The yield is nearly quantitative.

== Reactions ==
Many chemical reactions of Os_{3}(CO)_{12} have been examined. Direct reactions of ligands with the cluster often lead to complex product distributions. Os_{3}(CO)_{12} converts to more labile derivatives such as Os_{3}(CO)_{11}(MeCN) and Os_{3}(CO)_{10}(MeCN)_{2} using Me_{3}NO as a decarbonylating agent:

Os_{3}(CO)_{12} + (CH_{3})_{3}NO + CH_{3}CN → Os_{3}(CO)_{11}(CH_{3}CN) + CO_{2} + (CH_{3})_{3}N
Os_{3}(CO)_{11}(CH_{3}CN) + (CH_{3})_{3}NO + CH_{3}CN → Os_{3}(CO)_{10}(CH_{3}CN)_{2} + CO_{2} + (CH_{3})_{3}N

Os_{3}(CO)_{11}(MeCN) reacts with a variety of even weakly basic ligands to form adducts.

Purging a solution of triosmium dodecacarbonyl in boiling octane (or similar inert solvent of similar boiling point) with H_{2} gives the dihydride Os_{3}H_{2}(CO)_{10}:

Os_{3}(CO)_{12} + H_{2} → Os_{3}H_{2}(CO)_{10} + 2 CO

Osmium pentacarbonyl is obtained by treating solid triosmium dodecacarbonyl with 200 atmospheres of carbon monoxide at 280-290 °C.

Os_{3}(CO)_{12} + 3 CO → 3 Os(CO)_{5}
