= Iridium tetrachloride =

Identifiers
| CAS Number | 10025-97-5 |
| 3D model (JSmol) | Interactive image |
| ChemSpider | 11252181 |
| ECHA InfoCard | 100.030.032 |
| EC Number | 233-048-8 |
| PubChem CID | 24815 |
| UNII | PCG7KVC21I |
| CompTox Dashboard (EPA) | DTXSID10893602 |
- InChI: InChI=1S/4ClH.Ir/h4*1H;/q;;;;+4/p-4 Key: CALMYRPSSNRCFD-UHFFFAOYSA-J
- SMILES: Cl[Ir](Cl)(Cl)Cl

Properties
| Chemical formula | Cl_{4}Ir |
| Molar mass | 334.02 g·mol^{−1} |
| Appearance | amorphous brown solid |
| Melting point | 763 °C (1,405 °F; 1,036 K) (decomposes) |
| Solubility in water | soluble |
| Solubility | soluble in alcohol, dilute hydrochloric acid |

Hazards
- GHS labelling
| Pictograms | (GHS07: Exclamation mark) |
| Signal word | Warning |
| Hazard statements | H302, H315, H319, H335 |
| Precautionary statements | P261, P264, P264+P265, P270, P271, P280, P301+P317, P302+P352, P304+P340, P305+P351+P338, P319, P321, P330, P332+P317, P337+P317, P362+P364, P403+P233, P405, P501 |
- Except where otherwise noted, data are given for materials in their standard state (at 25 °C [77 °F], 100 kPa). Infobox references

Iridium tetrachloride is an inorganic compound with the approximate formula IrCl_{4}(H_{2}O)_{n}. It is a water-soluble, hygroscopic amorphous dark brown solid. A well-defined derivative is ammonium hexachloroiridate ((NH_{4})_{2}IrCl_{6}). It is used to prepare catalysts, such as the Henbest Catalyst for transfer hydrogenation of cyclohexanones.
