= Ruthenium tetrachloride =

Names
- Other names Ruthenium(IV) chloride, ruthenium(4+) tetrachloride

Identifiers
CAS Number	13465-52-6
3D model (JSmol)	Interactive image
ChemSpider	14807928
ECHA InfoCard	100.033.347
EC Number	236-697-5
PubChem CID	44145691
CompTox Dashboard (EPA)	50928705
- InChI: InChI=1S/4ClH.Ru/h4*1H;/q;;;;+4/p-4 Key: IREVRWRNACELSM-UHFFFAOYSA-J
- SMILES: [Cl-].[Cl-].[Cl-].[Cl-].[Ru+4]

Properties
Chemical formula	Cl_{4}Ru
Molar mass	242.87 g·mol^{−1}

Related compounds
Related compounds	Osmium tetrachloride
- Except where otherwise noted, data are given for materials in their standard state (at 25 °C [77 °F], 100 kPa). Infobox references

Ruthenium(IV) tetrachloride is volatile inorganic compound of ruthenium and chlorine with the formula RuCl_{4}.

== Properties ==
Ruthenium(IV) tetrachloride decomposes above -30 °C:

RuCl_{4} → RuCl_{3} + 0.5Cl_{2}

== Synthesis ==
Synthesis of ruthenium(IV) tetrachloride is formed by the action of chlorine gas on ruthenium(III) chloride at 750 °C:

RuCl_{3} + 0.5Cl_{2} → RuCl_{4}

The RuCl_{4} is collected on a liquefied air cooled condenser and decomposes above -30 °C. The reaction was determined to have the following thermodynamic properties:

- ΔH°_{298} = 36.6 kcal/mol (enthalpy)
- ΔS°_{298} = 32.8 entropy units (entropy change)
- ΔC°_{p} = -6.6 cal/mol degree (change in heat capacity at constant pressure)
- S°_{298} = 99.3 entropy units

The degree signs indicate standard state.
