= Triruthenium dodecacarbonyl =

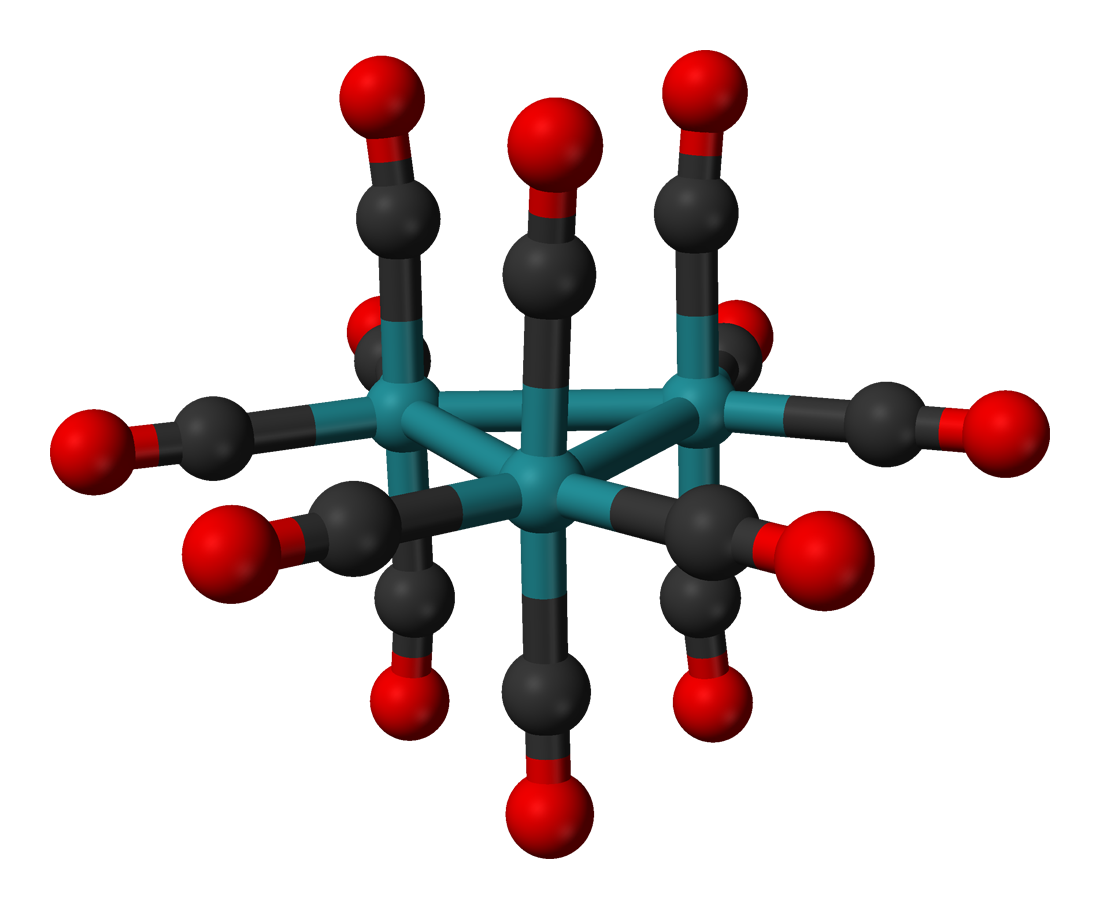

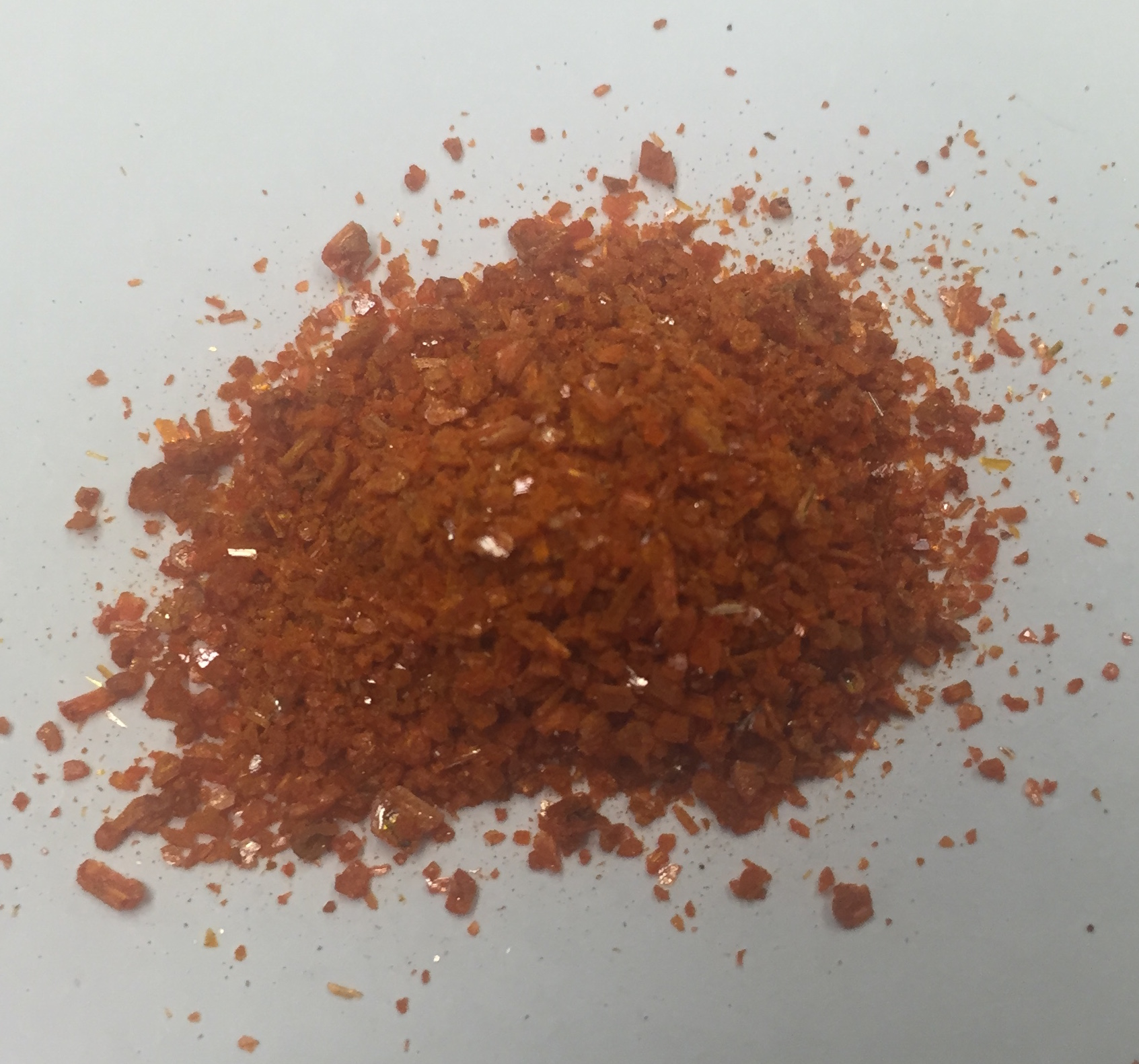

Names
- IUPAC name cyclo-tris(tetracarbonylruthenium)(3 Ru—Ru)
- Other names Ruthenium carbonyl

Identifiers
CAS Number	15243-33-1
3D model (JSmol)	Interactive image
ChemSpider	24589240
ECHA InfoCard	100.035.701
EC Number	239-287-4
PubChem CID	6096991
CompTox Dashboard (EPA)	DTXSID901015348
- InChI: InChI=1S/12CO.3Ru/c12*1-2;;; Key: NQZFAUXPNWSLBI-UHFFFAOYSA-N
- SMILES: [Ru-4]1(C#[O+])(C#[O+])(C#[O+])(C#[O+])[Ru-4](C#[O+])(C#[O+])(C#[O+])(C#[O+])[Ru-4]1(C#[O+])(C#[O+])(C#[O+])(C#[O+])

Properties
Chemical formula	C_{12}O_{12}Ru_{3}
Molar mass	639.33 g/mol
Appearance	orange solid
Density	2.48 g/cm^{3}
Melting point	154 °C (309 °F; 427 K)
Boiling point	sublimes in vacuum
Solubility in water	insoluble
Solubility in organic solvents	soluble

Structure
Molecular shape	D_{3h} cluster
Dipole moment	0 D

Hazards
- Occupational safety and health (OHS/OSH)
Main hazards	Toxic, CO Source
- GHS labelling
Pictograms	(GHS07: Exclamation mark)
Signal word	Warning
Hazard statements	H302, H315, H319, H332, H335
Precautionary statements	P261, P264, P270, P271, P280, P301+P312, P302+P352, P304+P312, P304+P340, P305+P351+P338, P312, P321, P330, P332+P313, P337+P313, P362, P403+P233, P405, P501

Related compounds
Related compounds	Triiron dodecacarbonyl Triosmium dodecacarbonyl
- Except where otherwise noted, data are given for materials in their standard state (at 25 °C [77 °F], 100 kPa). verify (what is ?) Infobox references

Triruthenium dodecacarbonyl is the chemical compound with the formula Ru_{3}(CO)_{12}. Classified as metal carbonyl cluster, it is a dark orange-colored solid that is soluble in nonpolar organic solvents. The compound serves as a precursor to other organoruthenium compounds.

== Structure and synthesis ==
The cluster has D_{3h} symmetry, consisting of an equilateral triangle of Ru atoms, each of which bears two axial and two equatorial CO ligands. The Ru-Ru distance is 284 pm. Os_{3}(CO)_{12} has the same structure. In Fe_{3}(CO)_{12}, two CO ligands are bridging, resulting in C_{2v} symmetry. In solution, Ru_{3}(CO)_{12} is fluxional as indicated by the observation of a single CO signal in the room temperature ^{13}C NMR spectrum. The barrier is estimated at 20 kJ/mol

Ru_{3}(CO)_{12} is prepared by treating solutions of ruthenium trichloride with carbon monoxide in the presence of a base. Dichlororuthenium tricarbonyl dimer is an intermediate. The stoichiometry of the reaction is uncertain, one possibility being the following:

6 RuCl_{3} + 33 CO + 18 CH_{3}OH → 2 Ru_{3}(CO)_{12} + 9 CO(OCH_{3})_{2} + 18 HCl

== Reactions ==
The chemical properties of Ru_{3}(CO)_{12} have been widely studied, and the cluster has been converted to hundreds of derivatives. High pressures of CO convert the cluster to the monomeric ruthenium pentacarbonyl, which reverts to the parent cluster upon standing.

Ru_{3}(CO)_{12} + 3 CO ⇌ 3 Ru(CO)_{5} K_{eq} = 3.3 × 10^{−7} mol dm^{−3} at room temperature

The instability of Ru(CO)_{5} contrasts with the robustness of the corresponding Fe(CO)_{5}. The condensation of Ru(CO)_{5} into Ru_{3}(CO)_{12} proceeds via initial, rate-limiting loss of CO to give the unstable, coordinatively unsaturated species Ru(CO)_{4}. This tetracarbonyl binds Ru(CO)_{5}, initiating the condensation.

Upon warming under a pressure of hydrogen, Ru_{3}(CO)_{12} converts to the tetrahedral cluster H_{4}Ru_{4}(CO)_{12}. Ru_{3}(CO)_{12} undergoes substitution reactions with Lewis bases:

Ru_{3}(CO)_{12} + n L → Ru_{3}(CO)_{12-n}L_{n} + n CO (n = 1, 2, or 3)

where L is a tertiary phosphine or an isocyanide. It forms complexes with acenaphthylene.

Ru_{3}(CO)_{12} forms a variety of alkene complexes, some where the Ru3 core remains intact but often with fragmentation. Upon treatment with 1,5-cyclooctadiene gives the monoRu tricarbonyl derivative:

Ru_{3}(CO)_{12} + 3 C_{8}H_{12} → 3 Ru(C_{8}H_{12})(CO)_{3} + 3 CO

Upon irradiation with UV light, Ru_{3}(CO)_{12} converts to an insoluble polymeric form.

=== Ru-carbido clusters ===
At high temperatures, Ru_{3}(CO)_{12} converts to a series of clusters that contain interstitial carbido ligands. These include Ru_{6}C(CO)_{17} and Ru_{5}C(CO)_{15}. Anionic carbido clusters are also known, including [Ru_{5}C(CO)_{14}]^{2−} and the bioctahedral cluster [Ru_{10}C_{2}(CO)_{24}]^{2−}. Ru_{3}(CO)_{12} -derived carbido compounds have been used to synthesize nanoparticles for catalysis. These particles consist of 6-7 atoms and thus are all surface, resulting in extraordinary activity.
