= Osmium(III) chloride =

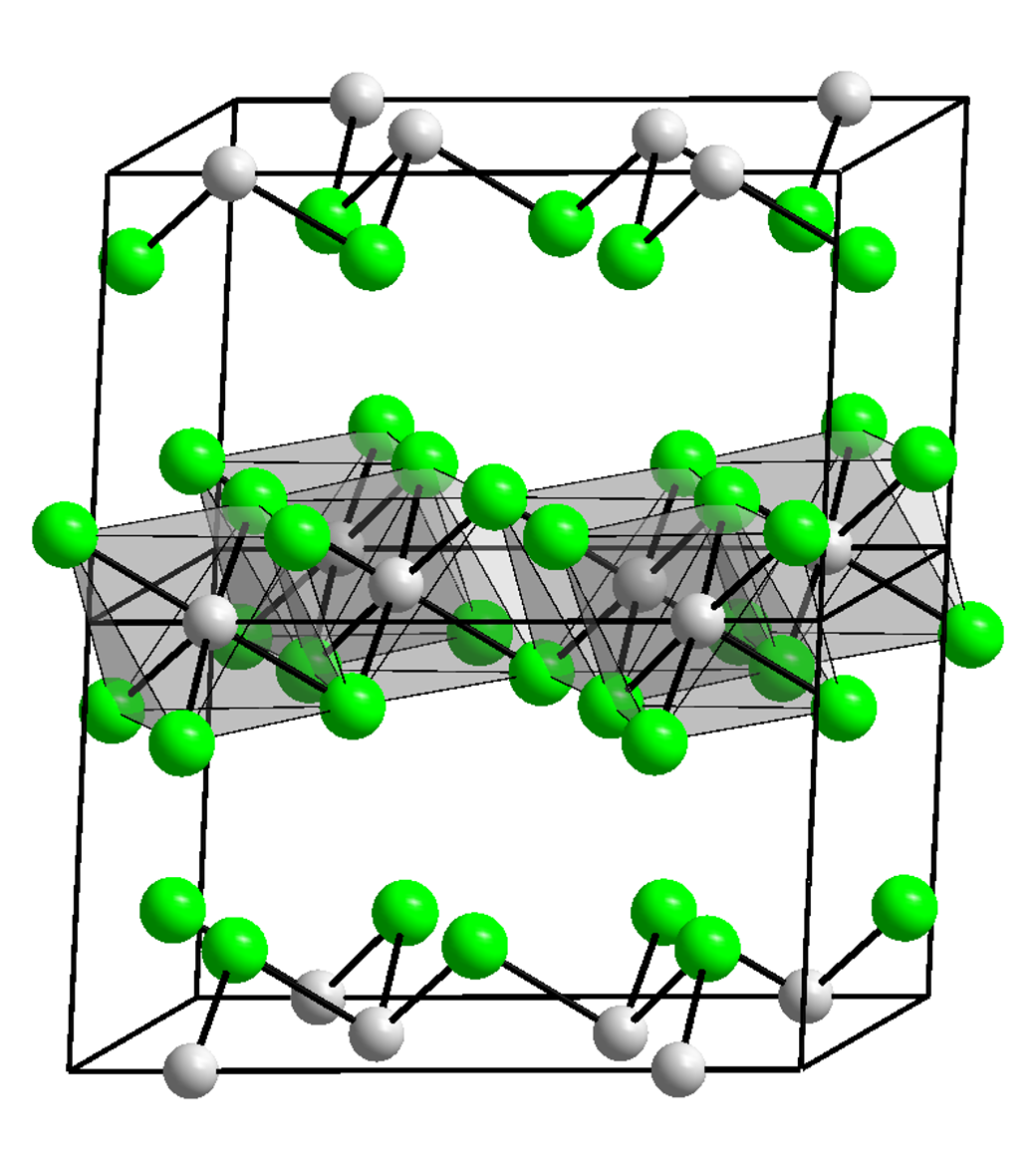

Names
- Other names: Trichloroosmium; Osmium trichloride

Identifiers
CAS Number	13444-93-4 anhydrous; 14996-60-2 trihydrate
3D model (JSmol)	Interactive image
ChemSpider	75306
ECHA InfoCard	100.033.247
EC Number	236-587-7
PubChem CID	83468
CompTox Dashboard (EPA)	3065457
- InChI: InChI=1S/3ClH.Os/h3*1H;/q;;;+3/p-3 Key: UAIHPMFLFVHDIN-UHFFFAOYSA-K
- SMILES: Cl[Os](Cl)Cl

Properties
Chemical formula	Cl_{3}Os
Molar mass	296.58 g·mol^{−1}
Appearance	dark gray solid (anhydrous) black crystals (hydrate)
Melting point	>500 °C (decomposes)
Solubility in water	insoluble
Solubility	soluble in nitric acid

Hazards
- GHS labelling
Pictograms	(GHS05: Corrosive) (GHS06: Toxic) (GHS07: Exclamation mark)
Signal word	Danger
Hazard statements	H301, H302, H311, H312, H314, H331, H332
Precautionary statements	P260, P262, P264, P264+P265, P270, P271, P280, P301+P316, P301+P317, P301+P330+P331, P302+P352, P302+P361+P354, P304+P340, P305+P354+P338, P316, P317, P321, P330, P361+P364, P362+P364, P363, P403+P233, P405, P501
- Except where otherwise noted, data are given for materials in their standard state (at 25 °C [77 °F], 100 kPa). Infobox references

Osmium(III) chloride is an inorganic compound of osmium and chlorine with the chemical formula OsCl_{3}.

== Synthesis ==
Osmium(III) chloride can be prepared by treating osmium with chlorine:

2Os + 3Cl_{2} → 2OsCl_{3}

It can also be prepared by the decomposition of osmium(IV) chloride:

2OsCl_{4} → 2OsCl_{3} + Cl_{2}

== Uses ==
Osmium(III) chloride hydrate is a precursor for the production of dichlorodihydridoosmium complexes and other compounds.

It is the precursor to a variety of arene complexes.

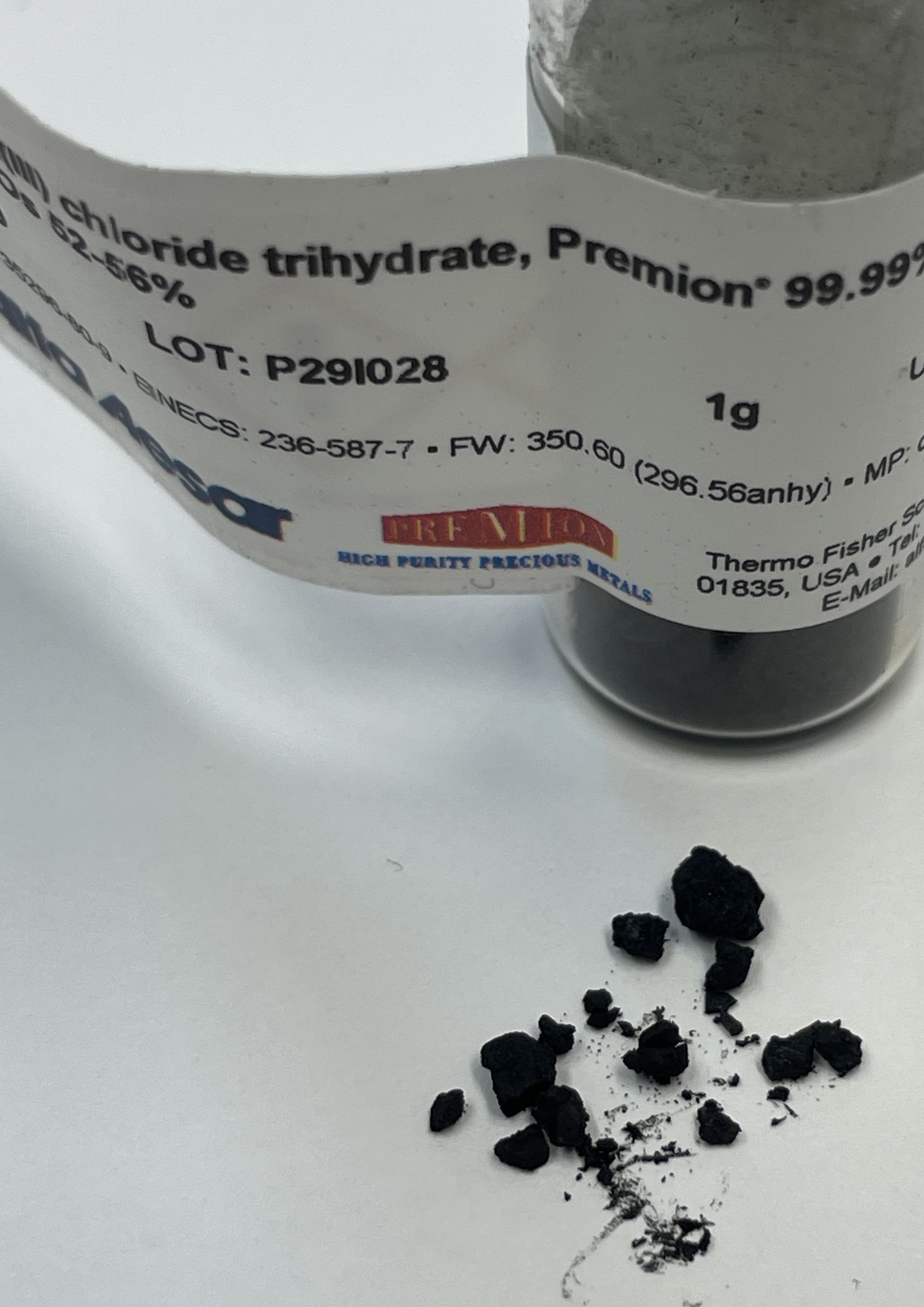
Sample of commercial osmium trichloride trihydrate.
