= Osmium(III) bromide =

Names
- IUPAC name Tribromoosmium
- Other names Osmium tribromide

Identifiers
CAS Number	59201-51-3
3D model (JSmol)	Interactive image
PubChem CID	15381336
- InChI: InChI=1S/3BrH.Os/h3*1H;/q;;;+3/p-3 Key: GCZALAMYKLLEHP-UHFFFAOYSA-K
- SMILES: [Os+3].[Br-].[Br-].[Br-]

Properties
Chemical formula	Br_{3}Os
Molar mass	429.94 g·mol^{−1}
Appearance	dark-grey solid
Melting point	340 °C (644 °F; 613 K)
Solubility in water	insoluble
- Except where otherwise noted, data are given for materials in their standard state (at 25 °C [77 °F], 100 kPa). Infobox references

Osmium(III) bromide is a binary inorganic compound with the chemical formula OsBr_{3}.

== Synthesis ==
It can be prepared by the decomposition of osmium tetrabromide under vacuum heating:

2OsBr_{4} → 2OsBr_{3} + Br_{2}
