= Osmium(II) chloride =

Names
- IUPAC name Osmium(II) chloride
- Other names Osmium dichloride

Identifiers
CAS Number	13444-92-3
3D model (JSmol)	Interactive image
ChemSpider	379789
PubChem CID	429382
- InChI: Key: OAGAGESCFZXSJR-UHFFFAOYSA-L; InChI=1S/2ClH.Os/h2*1H;/q;;+2/p-2
- SMILES: Cl[Os]Cl

Properties
Chemical formula	OsCl_{2}
Molar mass	261.14 g/mol
Appearance	hygroscopic dark brown solid
Density	4.38 g/cm^{3}
Melting point	450 °C (842 °F; 723 K)
Solubility in water	insoluble
Solubility	soluble in ethanol and ether.

Related compounds
Other anions	Osmium dibromide
Other cations	Iron(II) chloride Palladium(II) chloride
- Except where otherwise noted, data are given for materials in their standard state (at 25 °C [77 °F], 100 kPa). Infobox references

Osmium(II) chloride or osmium dichloride is an inorganic compound composed of osmium metal and chlorine with the chemical formula OsCl_{2}.

== Synthesis ==
Osmium(II) chloride can be prepared by disproportionation of osmium(III) chloride at 500 °C in vacuum:

2OsCl_{3} → OsCl_{4} + OsCl_{2}

== Uses ==
Osmium(II) chloride can be used for the catalytic production of trialkylamines.

== Reactions ==
Osmium(II) chloride reacts with carbon monoxide at 220 °C:

OsCl_{2} + 3CO → Os(CO)_{3}Cl_{2}
