= Osmium(IV) chloride =

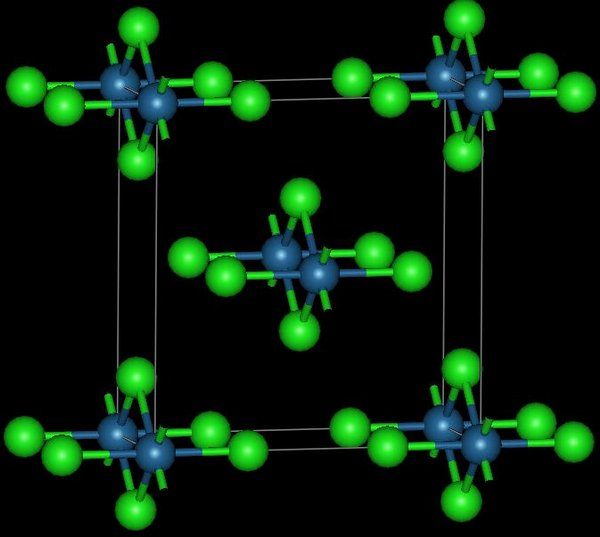

Names
- IUPAC name Osmium(IV) chloride
- Other names Osmium chloride, osmium tetrachloride

Identifiers
CAS Number	10026-01-4
3D model (JSmol)	Interactive image
ChemSpider	3285990
ECHA InfoCard	100.151.226
EC Number	622-467-5
PubChem CID	4070891
UNII	950AA6B72O
UN number	2471
CompTox Dashboard (EPA)	DTXSID30143075
- InChI: Key: IHUHXSNGMLUYES-UHFFFAOYSA-J; InChI=1S/4ClH.Os/h4*1H;/q;;;;+4/p-4
- SMILES: Cl[Os](Cl)(Cl)Cl

Properties
Chemical formula	OsCl_{4}
Molar mass	332.041 g/mol
Appearance	red-black orthorhombic crystals
Density	4.38 g/cm^{3}
Melting point	decomposes at 323°C
Solubility in water	reacts with water
Solubility	soluble in hydrochloric acid

Structure
Crystal structure	Orthorhombic, oS10
Space group	Cmmm, No. 65

Hazards
- GHS labelling
Pictograms	(GHS06: Toxic) (GHS07: Exclamation mark)
Signal word	Danger
Hazard statements	H301, H311, H315, H319, H331, H335
Precautionary statements	P261, P262, P264, P264+P265, P270, P271, P280, P301+P316, P302+P352, P304+P340, P305+P351+P338, P316, P319, P321, P330, P332+P317, P337+P317, P361+P364, P362+P364, P403+P233, P405, P501

Related compounds
Other anions	Osmium tetrabromide
Other cations	Iron(III) chloride Ruthenium(III) chloride Osmium(III) chloride
- Except where otherwise noted, data are given for materials in their standard state (at 25 °C [77 °F], 100 kPa). verify (what is ?) Infobox references

Osmium(IV) chloride or osmium tetrachloride is the inorganic compound composed of osmium and chlorine with the empirical formula OsCl_{4}. It exists in two polymorphs (crystalline forms). The compound is used to prepare other osmium complexes.

== Preparation, structure, reactions ==
It was first reported in 1909 as the product of chlorination of osmium metal. This route affords the high temperature polymorph:

Os + 2 Cl_{2} → OsCl_{4}

This reddish-black polymorph is orthorhombic and adopts a structure in which osmium centres are octahedrally coordinated, sharing opposite edges of the OsCl_{6} octahedra to form a chain. A brown, apparently cubic polymorph forms upon reduction of osmium tetroxide with thionyl chloride:

OsO_{4} + 4 SOCl_{2} → OsCl_{4} + 2 Cl_{2} + 4 SO_{2}

Osmium tetraoxide dissolves in hydrochloric acid to give the hexachloroosmate anion:

OsO_{4} + 10 HCl → H_{2}OsCl_{6} + 2 Cl_{2} + 4 H_{2}O
