= List of inorganic compounds named after people =

Well-known inorganic and organometallic compounds and reagents that are named after individuals include:

- Adams' catalyst (proposed to be PtO_{x})
- Adamsite (NH(C_{6}H_{4})_{2}AsCl)
- Adkins catalyst (Cu_{2}Cr_{2}O_{5})
- Attenburrow's Oxide (MnO_{2})
- Arduengo carbene (class of compounds)
- Baeyer's reagent (KMnO_{4}(aq))
- Benedict's reagent
- Bobbitt's salt (4-(Acetylamino)-2,2,6,6-tetramethyl-1-oxo-piperidinium tetrafluoroborate)
- Bertrand carbene (class of compounds)
- Brookhart's acid (H(OEt_{2})_{2}BAr^{F}_{4})
- Buckminsterfullerene (C_{60})
- Burow's solution (Al(CH_{3}CO_{2})_{3}(aq))
- Calderon catalyst (WCl_{6}/EtAlCl_{2}/EtOH)
- Caro's acid (H_{2}SO_{5})
- Chevreul's salt (Cu_{3}(SO_{3})_{2} • 2 H_{2}O)
- Chugaev's red salt ([Pt(C(NHMe)_{2}N_{2}H_{2}](CNMe)_{2}]Cl_{2})
- Chugaev's salt ([Pt(NH_{3})_{5}Cl]Cl_{3})
- Cleve's triammine ([Pt(NH_{3})_{3}Cl]Cl)
- Collman's reagent (Na_{2}Fe(CO)_{4})
- Collins reagent (CrO_{3} / py / CH_{2}Cl_{2})
- Condy's crystals (KMnO_{4})
- Corey–Chaykovsky reagent (O=S(CH_{2})Me_{2})
- Cornforth reagent ([pyH]_{2}[Cr_{2}O_{7}])
- Crabtree's catalyst (Ir(COD)(py)(PCy_{3})^{+})
- Creutz–Taube complex ([(NH_{3})_{10}Ru_{2}(pyrazine)]^{5+})
- Etard's reagent (CrO_{2}Cl_{2})
- Davy's reagent {(MeS)PS}_{2}S_{2}
- Deacon Catalyst (CuO/CuCl_{2})
- Dimroth's reagent (B(OAc)_{2})_{2}O
- Durrant's Salt (K_{2}[Co_{2}(oxalate)_{4}(OH)_{2}]3H_{2}O]
- Fehling's solution ([Cu(C_{4}H_{4}O_{6})_{2}]^{4−})
- Fenton's reagent (Fe^{2+} / H_{2}O_{2})
- Fetizon's reagent (Ag_{2}CO_{3} / celite)
- Fischer carbene (class of compounds related to [(CO)_{5}Cr=C(CH_{3})OCH_{3}]
- Folin–Ciocalteu reagent (H_{3}PMo_{12}O_{40} / H_{3}PW_{12}O_{40})
- Furukawa's cyclopropanation reagent (ZnEt_{2} / CH_{2}I_{2})
- Frémy's salt (Na_{2}NO(SO_{3})_{2})
- Gilman reagents (R_{2}CuLi, class of compounds)
- Glauber's salt (Na_{2}SO_{4}·10H_{2}O)
- Gmelin's salt (K_{3}Fe(CN)_{6})
- Gingras reagent (Ph_{3}SnF_{2}.N^{n}Bu_{4})
- Grignard reagents (RMgX, class of compounds)
- Grubbs catalyst (RuCl_{2}(PCy_{3})_{2}(CHPh))
- Hauser base (R_{2}NMgBr)
- Hoveyda–Grubbs catalyst (RuCl_{2}(PCy_{3})(CH(C_{6}H_{4})OiPr))
- Jacobsen's catalyst (derivative of Mn(salen)Cl)
- Jones reagent (CrO_{3} / H_{2}SO_{4}(aq) / Me_{2}CO)
- Jordan's cation ((Cp)_{2}Zr(Me)(THF)^{+})
- Kagan's reagent (SmI_{2})
- Karstedt's catalyst (Pt_{2}{(CH_{2}=CH_{2}Si(Me)_{2})_{2}O}_{3})
- Kauffmann's reagent ({O=M(THF)_{2}Cl(mu-CH_{2})}_{2} M = Mo, W)
- Keinan reagent (SiH_{2}I_{2})
- Kläui ligand {(C_{5}H_{5})Co[(CH_{3}O)_{2}PO]_{3}}^{−}
- Knölker complex (Fe(CO)_{2}H(hydroxycyclopentadienyl))
- Knowles' catalyst ([Rh-DIPAMP-COD]BF_{4})
- Kobayashi's anion (B[3,5-(CF_{3})_{2}C_{6}H_{3}]_{4}^{−})
- Koser's reagent (PhI(OTs)OH)
- Lawesson's reagent ([CH_{3}OC_{6}H_{4}PS_{2}]_{2})
- Lazier catalyst (Cu_{2}Cr_{2}O_{5})
- Lemieux-Johnson reagent (NaIO_{4} / OsO_{4})
- Lewisite (ClCH=CHAsCl_{2})
- Ley-Griffith reagent (RuO_{4}N(C_{3}H_{7})_{4})
- Lindlar catalyst (Pd / CaCO_{3} / PbO)
- Lombardo reagent (CH_{2}Br_{2} / TiCl_{4} / Zn)
- Lucas' reagent (ZnCl_{2} / HCl(aq))
- Luche reagent (NaBH_{4} / CeCl_{3})
- Magnus' green salt (Pt_{2}(NH_{3})_{4}Cl_{4})
- Magnus' pink salt (polymorph of Magnus' green salt)
- Marignac's salt (K_{2}Ta_{2}O_{3}F_{6})
- Meerwein's reagent [(CH_{3}CH_{2})_{3}O]BF_{4}
- Meisenheimer complex
- Millon's Base (Hg_{2}N)OH(H_{2}O)_{x}
- Millon's reagent (Hg/HNO_{3}(aq))
- Mohr's salt (NH_{4})_{2}Fe(SO_{4})_{2}·6H_{2}O
- Negishi reagent (Cp_{2}ZrBu_{2})
- Nessler's reagent (K_{2}HgI_{4})
- Normant reagents (RMgX + CuX)
- Nugent's reagent (TiCp_{2}Cl)
- Nysted reagent (ZnCH_{2}(ZnBr)_{2}.THF)
- Pearlman's catalyst (proposed to be Pd(OH)_{2}/C)
- Péligot's salt (KCrO_{3}Cl)
- Periana catalyst (Pt(2,2'-Bipyrimidine)Cl_{2})
- Petasis reagent (Cp_{2}TiMe_{2})
- Peyrone's salt (cis-PtCl_{2}(NH_{3})_{2})
- Piers' borane (HB(C_{6}F_{5})_{2})
- Piers' catalyst (RuCl_{2}(PCy_{3})CHPCy_{3}.BF_{4})
- Prevost's reagent (Ag(OBz) / I_{2})
- Raney nickel (hydrogen dissolved in high surface area nickel)
- Reinecke's salt (NH_{4}[Cr(NCS)_{4}(NH_{3})_{2}].H_{2}O)
- Reiset's second chloride (trans-PtCl_{2}(NH_{3})_{2}, his first salt is Peyrone's salt)
- Rice's Bromine Solution (Br_{2} / NaBr_{(aq)})
- Rieke metals (class of materials)
- Rochelle salt (KNaC_{4}H_{4}O_{6}·4H_{2}O)
- Roussin's black salt (KFe_{4}S_{3}(NO)_{7})
- Roussin's red salt (K_{2}Fe_{2}S_{2}(NO)_{4})
- Scheele's green (CuHAsO_{3})
- Schlosser's base (^{n}BuLi/KO^{t}Bu)
- Schrock carbene (class of compounds related to [((CH_{3})_{3}CCH_{2})_{3}Ta=CHC(CH_{3})_{3}]
- Schrock catalyst
- Schrock-Osborn catalyst (CODRh(PPh_{3})_{2}^{+})
- Schultze's reagent (KClO_{3} / HNO_{3})
- Schweinfurter Green (Cu(OAc)_{2}·3Cu(AsO_{2})_{2})
- Schwartz's reagent (Cp_{2}Zr(H)Cl)
- Schweizer's reagent ([Cu(NH_{3})_{4}(H_{2}O)_{2}](OH)_{2})
- Schwessinger base (P(NP(NMe_{2})_{3})_{3}(NtBu))
- Scott-Wilson Reagent (Hg(CN)_{2}/AgNO_{3}/KOH)
- Seignette's salt (KNaC_{4}H_{4}O_{6}·4H_{2}O)
- Seyferth reagent (PhHgCCl_{3})
- Shilov catalyst (PtCl_{2} / H_{2}PtCl_{6})
- Sharpless reagent (Ti(O^{i}Pr)4 / diethyl tartrate / ^{t}BuOOH)
- Shvo catalyst ((C_{5}Ph_{4}O)_{2}HRu_{2}H(CO)_{4})
- Simmons–Smith reagent (ICH_{2}ZnI)
- Sonnenschein's Reagent (H_{3}PMo_{12}O_{40})
- Speier's catalyst (H_{2}PtCl_{6})
- Spirit of Mindererus (NH_{4}CH_{3}CO_{2(aq)})
- Stiles' reagent (Mg(OCO_{2}Me)_{2})
- Stryker's reagent (Cu_{6}H_{6}(PPh_{3})_{6})
- Swart's reagent (SbF_{3})
- Tebbe's reagent (Cp_{2}TiCl(CH_{2})AlMe_{2})
- Tollens' reagent ([Ag(NH_{3})_{2}]^{+})
- Trinder reagent (10% FeCl_{3}(aq))
- Turnbull's blue (Fe_{7}(CN)_{18}⋅14H_{2}O)
- Udenfriend reagent
- Ugi's amine (Fe(Cp)(C_{5}H_{4}CH(Me)(NMe_{2}))
- Vauquelin's Salt (Pd analogue of Magnus' green salt, Pd_{2}(NH_{3})_{4}Cl_{4})
- Vaska's complex (trans-IrCl(CO)[PPh_{3}]_{2})
- Vedejs' reagent (Mo(O)(O_{2})_{2}(py)(OP(NMe_{2})_{3}))
- Wagner's Reagent (I_{2} / KI / H_{2}O)
- Wanzlick carbene (class of compounds)
- Well's salt (CsAuCl_{3})
- White catalyst ((PhS(O)CH_{2}CH_{2}S(O)Ph).Pd(OAc)_{2})
- Wij's Solution (ICl / acetic acid)
- Wilkinson's catalyst (RhCl(PPh_{3})_{3})
- Wolffram's Red Salt [Pt(C_{2}H_{5}NH_{2})_{4}][Pt(C_{2}H_{5}NH_{2})_{4}Cl_{2}]Cl_{4}·4H_{2}O
- Woollins' reagent ((PhP(Se)Se)_{2})
- Zeise's salt (K[PtCl_{3}(C_{2}H_{4})]·H_{2}O)
- Zerewitinoff Reagent (MeMgI / ^{n}Bu_{2}O)
- Zhan catalyst (RuCl_{2}(PCy_{3})(CH(2-SO_{2}NMe_{2}-C_{6}H_{3})OiPr))
- Ziegler–Natta catalyst
- ZoBell's solution (KCl/K_{4}[Fe(CN)_{6}]/K_{3}[Fe(CN)_{6}])

== See also ==
- List of inorganic reactions
- List of inorganic compounds
- List of organic reactions
- List of organic compounds
- List of alloys
- Inorganic compounds by element
