= Wurz =

Wurz, Wurtz, Wuerz, Wuertz, Würz, Würtz, is a Germanic surname.

Wurz (also Wurtz) is a German surname. Notable people with the surname include:

Wurz

- Alexander Wurz (born 1974), Austrian racing driver
- Charlie Wurz (born 2005), Austrian racing driver
- Oscar Wurz (born 2007), Austrian racing driver
- Stefan Wurz (born 1964), German composer

Wurtz

- B. Wurtz (Bill Wurtz), American sculptor
- Bill Wurtz, American video creator and musician
- Cate Wurtz, American webcomic and multimedia artist
- Charles-Adolphe Wurtz (1817–1884), French chemist
- Francis Wurtz (born 1948), French member of the European Parliament
- Johannes Wurtz (born 1992), German association footballer
- Robert Wurtz (born 1936), American neuroscientist
- Robert Wurtz (referee) (born 1941), French association football referee

Würtz (transliterated Wuertz) is the surname of:

- Ádám Würtz (1927–1994), Hungarian graphic artist, illustrator and painter
- Christian Würtz (born 1971), German Roman Catholic bishop
- Klára Würtz (1965), Hungarian concert pianist
- Rasmus Würtz (born 1983), Danish association footballer

Wuertz

- Michael Wuertz (born 1978), American baseball player

== See also ==
- Wertz
- Wirtz
