= List of inorganic reactions =

Well-known types of reactions that involve inorganic compounds include:

- Alkylation
- Alkyne trimerisation
- Alkyne metathesis
- Aminolysis
- Amination
- Arylation
- Barbier reaction
- Beta-hydride elimination
- Birch reduction
- Bönnemann cyclization
- Bromination
- Buchwald–Hartwig coupling
- Cadiot–Chodkiewicz coupling
- Calcination
- Carbometalation
- Carbothermal reduction
- Carbonation
- Carbonylation
- Castro–Stephens coupling
- Clemmensen reduction
- Chain walking
- Chan–Lam coupling
- Chlorination
- Comproportionation
- C–C coupling
- C–H activation
- Cyanation
- Cyclometalation
- Decarbonylation
- Decarboxylation
- Dehydration
- Dehalogenation
- Dehydrogenation
- Dehydrohalogenation
- Deprotonation
- Desilylation
- Dimerisation
- Disproportionation
- Dötz reaction
- Eder reaction
- Electromerism
- Electron transfer (inner sphere and outer sphere)
- Étard reaction
- Fenton oxidation
- Fischer–Tropsch process
- Fluorination
- Formylation
- Fowler process
- Fukuyama coupling
- Glaser coupling
- Gomberg–Bachmann reaction
- Haber–Weiss reaction
- Halcon process
- Halogenation
- Hay coupling
- Heck reaction
- Heck–Matsuda reaction
- Hiyama coupling
- Hofmann-Sand reaction
- Homolysis
- Huisgen cycloaddition
- Hydride reduction
- Hydroamination
- Hydration
- Hydroboration
- Hydrocarboxylation
- Hydrocyanation
- Hydrodesulfurization
- Hydroformylation
- Hydrogenation
- Hydrohalogenation
- Hydrolysis
- Hydrometalation
- Hydrosilylation
- Iodination
- Isomerisation
- Jones oxidation
- Kulinkovich reaction
- Kumada coupling
- Lemieux–Johnson oxidation
- Ley oxidation
- Linkage isomerization
- Luche reduction
- McMurry reaction
- Meerwein–Ponndorf–Verley reduction
- Mercuration
- Methylation
- Migratory insertion
- Negishi coupling
- Nicholas reaction
- Nitrosylation
- Noyori asymmetric hydrogenation
- Olefin polymerization
- Oppenauer oxidation
- Oxidation
- Oxidative addition
- Oxygenation
- Oxymercuration reaction
- Pauson–Khand reaction
- Photodissociation
- Pseudorotation
- Protonation
- Protonolysis
- Proton-coupled electron transfer
- Racemization
- Redox reactions (see list of oxidants and reductants)
- Reduction
- Reductive elimination
- Reppe synthesis
- Riley oxidation
- Salt metathesis
- Sarett oxidation
- Sharpless epoxidation
- Shell higher olefin process
- Silylation
- Simmons–Smith reaction
- Sonogashira coupling
- Staudinger reaction
- Stille reaction
- Sulfidation
- Suzuki reaction
- Transmetalation
- Ullmann reaction
- Upjohn dihydroxylation
- Wacker process
- Water gas shift reaction
- Water oxidation
- Wurtz coupling
- Ziegler-Natta polymerization

== See also ==
- List of organic reactions
- Named inorganic compounds
- List of inorganic compounds
- Inorganic compounds by element
