= Dichlorotris(triphenylphosphine)ruthenium(II) =

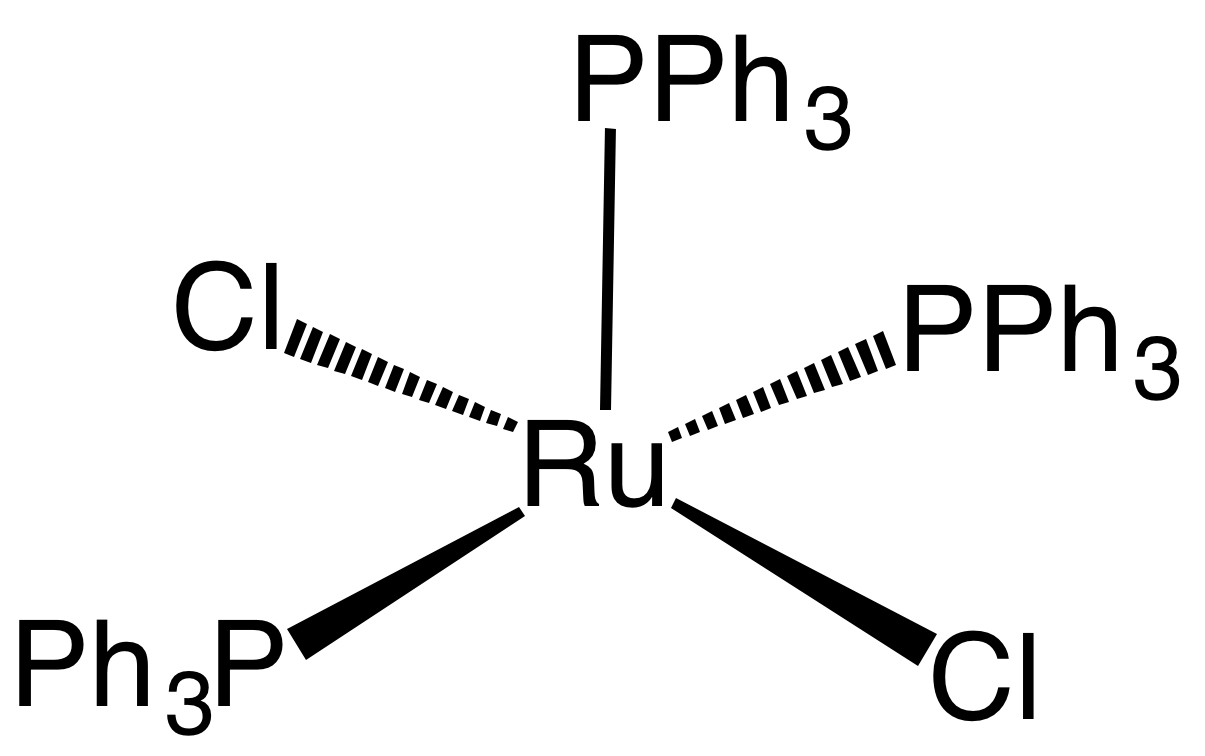
- Dichlorotris(triphenylphosphine)ruthenium(II)

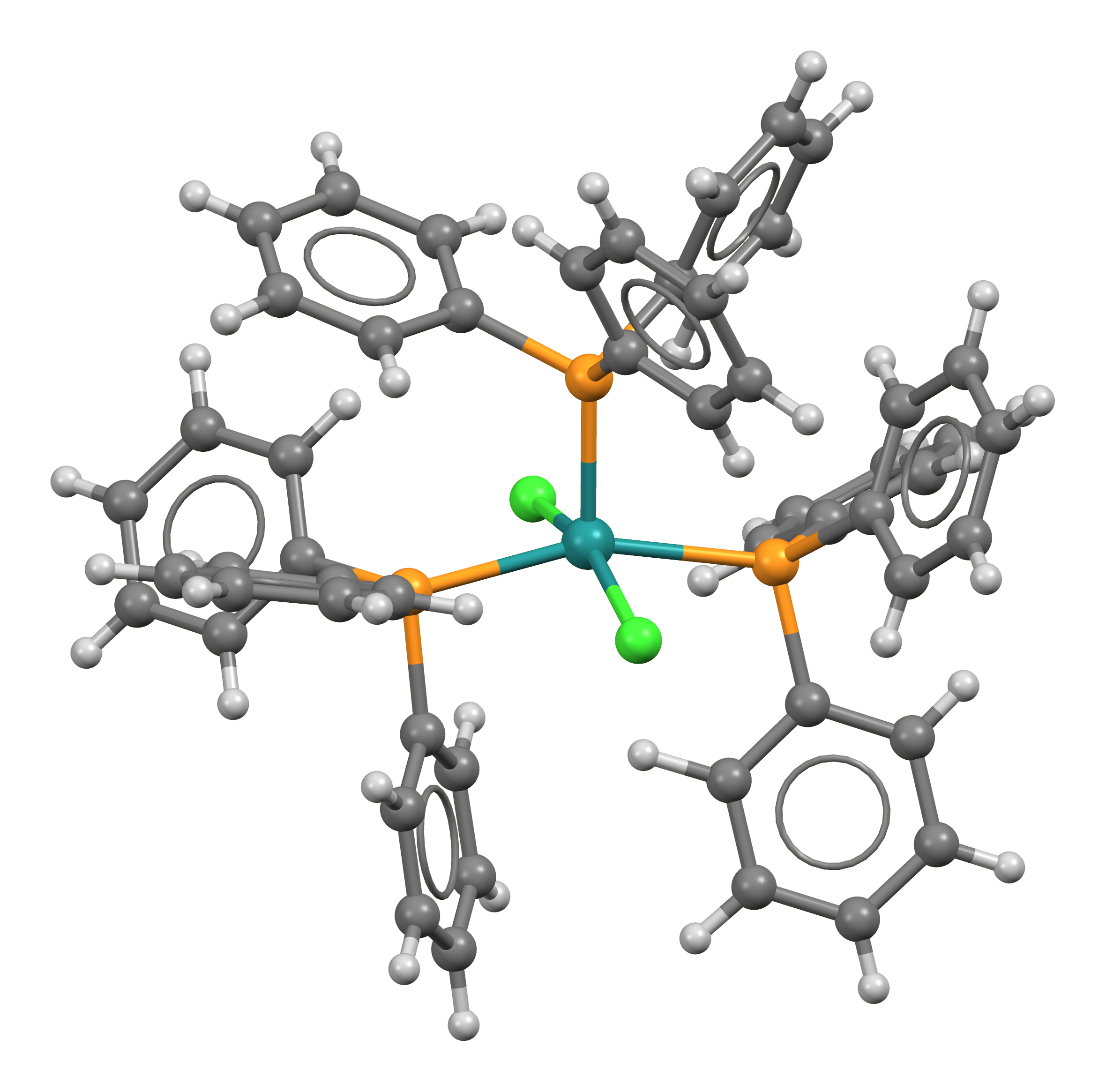

Names
- IUPAC name Dichlorotris(triphenylphosphine)ruthenium(II)
- Other names Ruthenium tris(triphenylphosphine) dichloride; Tris(triphenylphosphine)dichlororuthenium; Tris(triphenylphosphine)ruthenium dichloride;Tris(triphenylphosphine)ruthenium(II) dichloride

Identifiers
CAS Number	15529-49-4
3D model (JSmol)	Interactive image
ChemSpider	76650
ECHA InfoCard	100.035.957
EC Number	239-569-7
PubChem CID	11007548
CompTox Dashboard (EPA)	DTXSID30935179
- InChI: InChI=1S/3C18H15P.2ClH.Ru/c3*1-4-10-16(11-5-1)19(17-12-6-2-7-13-17)18-14-8-3-9-15-18;;;/h3*1-15H;2*1H;/q;;;;;+2/p-2 Key: WIWBLJMBLGWSIN-UHFFFAOYSA-L; InChI=1/3C18H15P.2ClH.Ru/c3*1-4-10-16(11-5-1)19(17-12-6-2-7-13-17)18-14-8-3-9-15-18;;;/h3*1-15H;2*1H;/q;;;;;+2/p-2 Key: WIWBLJMBLGWSIN-NUQVWONBAX
- SMILES: [Ru+2].[Cl-].[Cl-].c3c(P(c1ccccc1)c2ccccc2)cccc3.c1ccccc1P(c2ccccc2)c3ccccc3.c1ccccc1P(c2ccccc2)c3ccccc3

Properties
Chemical formula	C_{54}H_{45}Cl_{2}P_{3}Ru
Molar mass	958.83 g/mol
Appearance	Black Crystals or Red-Brown
Density	1.43 g cm^{−3}
Melting point	133 °C; 271 °F; 406 K

Structure
Crystal structure	Monoclinic
Space group	C_{2h}^{5}-P2_{1/c}
Lattice constant	a = 18.01 Å, b = 20.22 Å, c = 12.36 Å α = 90°, β = 90.5°, γ = 90°
Coordination geometry	Octahedral

Hazards
- GHS labelling
Pictograms	(GHS07: Exclamation mark)
Signal word	Warning
Hazard statements	H302, H312, H332
Precautionary statements	P261, P264, P270, P271, P280, P301+P312, P302+P352, P304+P312, P304+P340, P312, P322, P330, P363, P501
- Except where otherwise noted, data are given for materials in their standard state (at 25 °C [77 °F], 100 kPa). verify (what is ?) Infobox references

Dichlorotris(triphenylphosphine)ruthenium(II) is a coordination complex of ruthenium. It is a chocolate brown solid that is soluble in organic solvents such as benzene. The compound is used as a precursor to other complexes including those used in homogeneous catalysis.

== Synthesis and basic properties ==
RuCl_{2}(PPh_{3})_{3} is the product of the reaction of ruthenium trichloride trihydrate with a methanolic solution of triphenylphosphine.

2 RuCl_{3}(H_{2}O)_{3} + 7 PPh_{3} → 2 RuCl_{2}(PPh_{3})_{3} + 2 HCl + 5 H_{2}O + OPPh_{3}

The coordination sphere of RuCl_{2}(PPh_{3})_{3} can be viewed as either five-coordinate or octahedral. One coordination site is occupied by one of the hydrogen atoms of a phenyl group. This Ru---H agostic interaction is long (2.59 Å) and weak. The low symmetry of the compound is reflected by the differing lengths of the Ru-P bonds: 2.374, 2.412, and 2.230 Å. The Ru-Cl bond lengths are both 2.387 Å.

== Reactions ==
In the presence of excess of triphenylphosphine, RuCl_{2}(PPh_{3})_{3} binds a fourth phosphine to give black RuCl_{2}(PPh_{3})_{4}. The triphenylphosphine ligands in both the tris(phosphine) and tetrakis(phosphine) complexes are readily substituted by other ligands. The tetrakis(phosphine) complex is a precursor to the Grubbs catalysts.

Dichlorotris(triphenylphosphine)ruthenium(II) reacts with hydrogen in the presence of base to give the purple-colored monohydride HRuCl(PPh_{3})_{3}.

RuCl_{2}(PPh_{3})_{3} + H_{2} + NEt_{3} → HRuCl(PPh_{3})_{3} + [HNEt_{3}]Cl

Dichlorotris(triphenylphosphine)ruthenium(II) reacts with carbon monoxide to produce the all trans isomer of dichloro(dicarbonyl)bis(triphenylphosphine)ruthenium(II).

RuCl_{2}(PPh_{3})_{3} + 2 CO → trans,trans,trans-RuCl_{2}(CO)_{2}(PPh_{3})_{2} + PPh_{3}

This kinetic product isomerizes to the cis adduct during recrystallization. trans-RuCl_{2}(dppe)_{2} forms upon treating RuCl_{2}(PPh_{3})_{3} with dppe.

RuCl_{2}(PPh_{3})_{3} + 2 dppe → RuCl_{2}(dppe)_{2} + 3 PPh_{3}

RuCl_{2}(PPh_{3})_{3} catalyzes the decomposition of formic acid into carbon dioxide and hydrogen gas in the presence of an amine. Since carbon dioxide can be trapped and hydrogenated on an industrial scale, formic acid represents a potential storage and transportation medium.

== Use in organic synthesis ==
RuCl_{2}(PPh_{3})_{3} facilitates oxidations, reductions, cross-couplings, cyclizations, and isomerization. It is used in the Kharasch addition of chlorocarbons to alkenes.

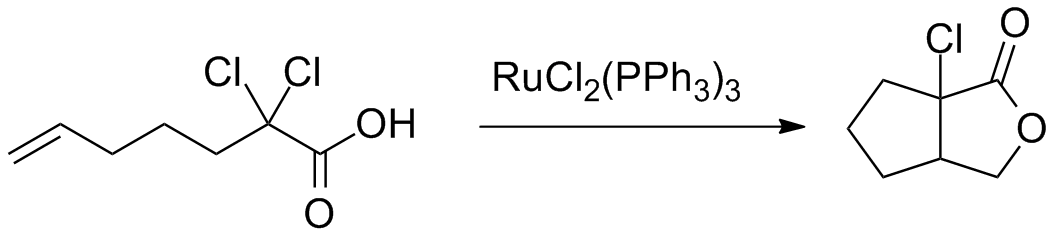

Dichlorotris(triphenylphosphine)ruthenium(II) serves as a precatalyst for the hydrogenation of alkenes, nitro compounds, ketones, carboxylic acids, and imines. On the other hand, it catalyzes the oxidation of alkanes to tertiary alcohols, amides to t-butyldioxyamides, and tertiary amines to α-(t-butyldioxyamides) using tert-butyl hydroperoxide. Using other peroxides, oxygen, and acetone, the catalyst can oxidize alcohols to aldehydes or ketones. Using dichlorotris(triphenylphosphine)ruthenium(II) the N-alkylation of amines with alcohols is also possible (see "borrowing hydrogen").

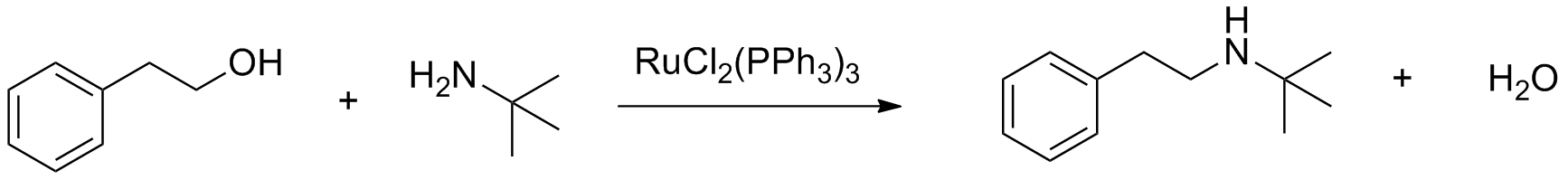

RuCl_{2}(PPh_{3})_{3} efficiently catalyzes carbon-carbon bond formation from cross couplings of alcohols through C-H activation of sp^{3} carbon atoms in the presence of a Lewis acid.

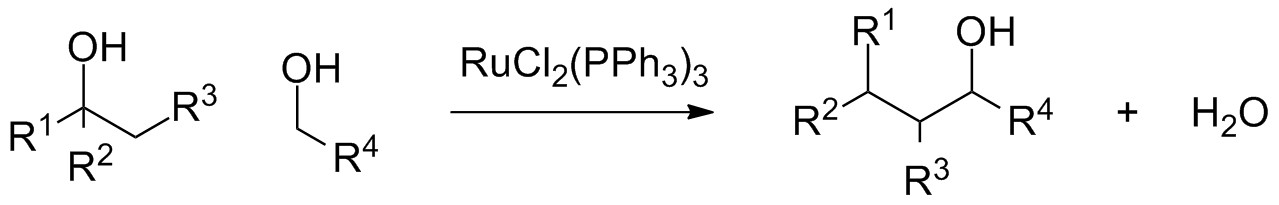
