= Wolffram's red salt =

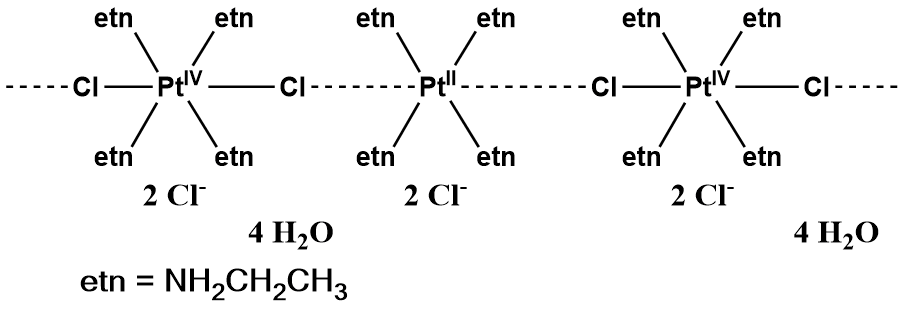

Identifiers
CAS Number	22638-32-0
3D model (JSmol)	Interactive image
PubChem CID	171041440
CompTox Dashboard (EPA)	DTXSID301337164
- InChI: InChI=1S/8C2H7N.6ClH.4H2O.2Pt/c8*1-2-3;;;;;;;;;;;;/h8*2-3H2,1H3;6*1H;4*1H2;;/q;;;;;;;;;;;;;;;;;;+2;+4/p-6 Key: SGSYXIUOMVBDFW-UHFFFAOYSA-H
- SMILES: CCN.CCN.CCN.CCN.CCN.CCN.CCN.CCN.O.O.O.O.[Cl-].[Cl-].[Cl-].[Cl-].[Cl-].[Cl-].[Pt+2].[Pt+4]

Properties
Chemical formula	[Pt(C_{2}H_{5}NH_{2})_{4}Cl_{2}][Pt(C_{2}H_{5}NH_{2})_{4}]Cl_{4}·4H_{2}O
Molar mass	1036.2 g/mol
Appearance	dark red solid
Density	1.81 g/cm^{3}

Structure
Crystal structure	Tetragonal
Space group	I4mm
Lattice constant	a = 13.28 (.05) Å, c = 5.39 (.05) Å
Lattice volume (V)	951 Å^{3}
Formula units (Z)	1
- Except where otherwise noted, data are given for materials in their standard state (at 25 °C [77 °F], 100 kPa). Infobox references

Wolffram’s Red Salt is an inorganic compound with the formula [Pt(C_{2}H_{5}NH_{2})_{4}Cl_{2}][Pt(C_{2}H_{5}NH_{2})_{4}]Cl_{4}·4H_{2}O. This compound is an early example of a one-dimensional coordination polymer, serving as a representative structure for studies in solid-state physics. This species has been of interest due to the unusual mixed valence system of Pt(II) and Pt(IV) bridged by a chlorine atom. The deep red color of the double salt, where the components were colorless, piqued the interest of early inorganic chemists and ultimately inspired studies into the physical properties of the compound in search of potential applications.

== History ==
In 1850, Charles-Adolphe Wurtz described a colorless platinum tetrammine with the formula [Pt(etn)_{4}]Cl_{2} 2H_{2}O; Wolffram (H. Wolffram, Dissertation, Königsberg, 1900.), whom the compound is named after, obtained a red salt from this by action of hydrogen peroxide in hydrochloric acid, and initially considered it to be isomeric with Wurtz’s salt. With no known case of plato-tetrammine isomerism at the time, this prompted extensive discussion in the literature of the true nature and properties of Wolffram’s Red Salt.

== Preparation ==
Reihlen and Flohr demonstrated that Wolffram’s salt could be prepared directly by mixing aqueous solutions of the colorless [Pt(etn)_{4}]Cl_{2} and its yellow analogue, [Pt(etn)_{4}Cl_{2}]Cl_{2}, where etn = NH_{2}CH_{2}CH_{3}, leading to the most probable conclusion of the double salt formula, [Pt(C_{2}H_{5}NH_{2})_{4}Cl_{2}][Pt(C_{2}H_{5}NH_{2})_{4}]Cl_{4}·4H_{2}O, compared with concurrently postulated explanations of tervalent platinum.

== Studies ==
Early explanations for the deep red color of the salt were attributed to the special structure of the crystal lattice, albeit with little explanation. While Drew & Tess attempted to explain the deep color of this compound based on the assumption of a Pt(III) species, Jensen established the diamagnetism of the compound and proved that it did not involve Pt(III). Spectrochemical studies on the compound crystals concluded that the deep color of Wolffram’s salt crystals is due to the stacking of the “infinite chains” - linear Pt(II)/Pt(IV) stacked on top of each other. In 1960, the crystal structure was shown to be consistent with the formulated double salt, inspiring examinations of other analogues to compare and better understand this unique coordination pattern. Solid-state physical examinations were conducted to further elucidate the charge transfer across the mixed valence chain and potentially find use as semiconductors. X-ray scattering studies were performed, explicitly showing the mixed valence chain structure. Optical properties were probed, as well as potential use as a photocatalyst, albeit with disappointing results.
