= Eugène-Melchior Péligot =

French chemist (1811–1890)

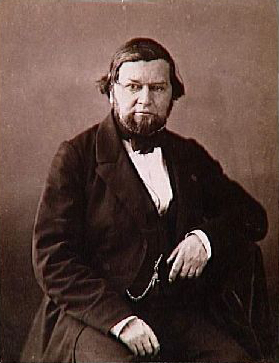
- Born: 24 March 1811; Paris, France
- Died: 15 April 1890 (aged 79); Paris, France
- Known for: Discovery of potassium chlorochromate Isolation of uranium
- Awards: Legion of Honor
- Scientific career
- Fields: Chemistry
- Workplaces: Institut National Agronomique
- Thesis: Recherches sur la nature et les propriétés chimiques des sucres (1838)

Eugène-Melchior Péligot (French: [eʒɛn mɛlkjɔʁ peliɡo]; 24 March 1811 – 15 April 1890), also known as Eugène Péligot, was a French chemist who isolated the first sample of uranium metal in 1841.

Péligot proved that the black powder of Martin Heinrich Klaproth was not a pure metal (it was an oxide of uranium, known in chemistry as UO_{2}). He then succeeded in producing pure uranium metal by reducing uranium tetrachloride (UCl_{4}) with potassium metal in 1841. Today better methods have been found.

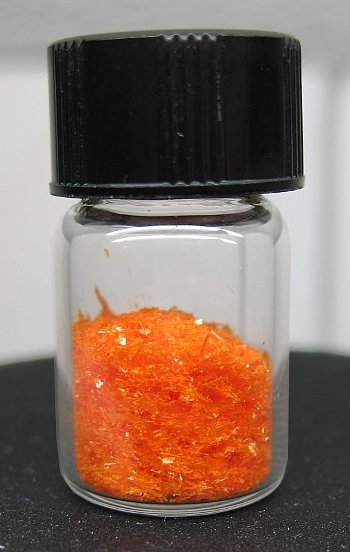
Potassium chlorochromate was discovered by Péligot and is sometimes referred to as Péligot's salt.

Péligot was a professor of analytical chemistry at the Institut National Agronomique. He collaborated with Jean-Baptiste Dumas, and together they discovered the methyl radical during experiments on wood spirit (methanol). The terminology "methyl alcohol" was created by both chemists from "wood wine". They also prepared the gaseous dimethyl ether, and many esters. In 1838, they successfully transformed camphor into p-cymene using phosphorus pentoxide.

In 1844 he synthesized chromium(II) acetate, which was much later recognized (by F. Albert Cotton in 1964) to be the first chemical compound which contains a quadruple bond.

== See also ==
- List of chemists
