= Methanol (data page) =

Chemical data page

This page provides supplementary chemical data on methanol.

== Safety Data Sheet ==
The handling of this chemical may incur notable safety precautions. It is highly recommended that you seek the Safety Datasheet (SDS) for this chemical from a reliable source such as SIRI, and follow its directions. SDS is available at MSDS, Avantor and Loba Chemie

== Structure and properties ==
Structure and properties
Index of refraction, n_{D}	1.328 at 20 °C
Dielectric constant, ε_{r}	32.66 at 20 °C
Magnetic susceptibility	5.3×10^{−7} cm^{3}·g^{−1}
Surface tension	22.5 dyn/cm at 20 °C
Viscosity	0.808 mPa·s at 0 °C; 0.690 mPa·s at 10 °C; 0.593 mPa·s at 20 °C; 0.449 mPa·s at 40 °C; 0.349 mPa·s at 60 °C

== Thermodynamic properties ==
Phase behavior
Triple point	175.5 K (−97.7 °C), 1.86·10^{−1} Pa
Critical point	513 K (240 °C), 78.5 atm
Std enthalpy change of fusion, Δ_{fus}H^{~~o~~}	3.1773 kJ/mol
Std entropy change of fusion, Δ_{fus}S^{~~o~~}	18.1 J/(mol·K)
Std enthalpy change of vaporization, Δ_{vap}H^{~~o~~}	37.6 ± 0.5 kJ/mol
Std entropy change of vaporization, Δ_{vap}S^{~~o~~}	113 J/(mol·K)
Solid properties
Std enthalpy change of formation, Δ_{f}H^{~~o~~}_{solid}	? kJ/mol
Standard molar entropy, S^{~~o~~}_{solid}	? J/(mol K)
Heat capacity, c_{p}	? J/(mol K)
Liquid properties
Std enthalpy change of formation, Δ_{f}H^{~~o~~}_{liquid}	−238.4 kJ/mol
Standard molar entropy, S^{~~o~~}_{liquid}	127.2 J/(mol K)
Enthalpy of combustion Δ_{c}H^{~~o~~}	−715.0 kJ/mol
Heat capacity, c_{p}	70.8–90.5 J/(mol K) (at −97.6 to 64.7 °C) 79.9 J/(mol K) at 20 °C
Gas properties
Std enthalpy change of formation, Δ_{f}H^{~~o~~}_{gas}	−201.3 kJ/mol
Standard molar entropy, S^{~~o~~}_{gas}	239.9 J/(mol K)
Heat capacity, c_{p}	52.29 J/(mol K) at 77 °C; 61.43 J/(mol K) at 100–223 °C
Heat capacity ratio, γ = c_{p}/c_{v}	1.203 at 77 °C
van der Waals' constants	a = 964.9 L^{2} kPa/mol^{2} b = 0.06702 liter per mole

== Spectral data ==
UV-Vis
λ_{max}
? nm
Extinction coefficient, ε
?
IR
Major absorption bands

(liquid film)
Wave number	transmittance
3347 cm^{−1}	6%
3336 cm^{−1}	8%
2945 cm^{−1}	18%
2833 cm^{−1}	22%
2522 cm^{−1}	77%
2046 cm^{−1}	84%
1460 cm^{−1}	47%
1116 cm^{−1}	62%
1030 cm^{−1}	4%
662 cm^{−1}	58%

NMR
Proton NMR
3.97 ppm, 3.417 ppm
Carbon-13 NMR
50.05 ppm
Other NMR data

MS
Masses of
main fragments

== Vapor pressure of liquid ==
P in mm Hg	1	10	40	90	400	760	1520	3800	7600	15200	30400	45600
T in °C	−44.0	−16.2	5.0	21.2	49.9	64.7	84.0	112.5	138.0	167.8	203.5	224.0

Table data obtained from CRC Handbook of Chemistry and Physics 44th ed

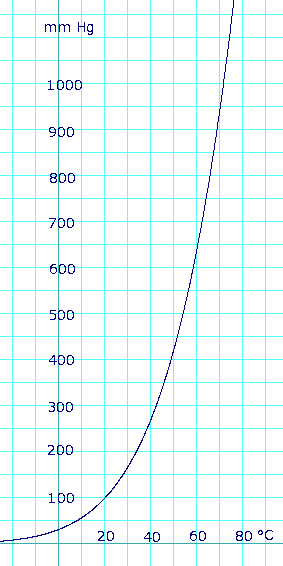
Methanol vapor pressure vs. temperature. Uses Antoine's equation: $\scriptstyle P_{mmHg} = 10^{7.87863 - \frac {1473.11} {230.0+T}}$ from Lange's Handbook of Chemistry 10th ed.

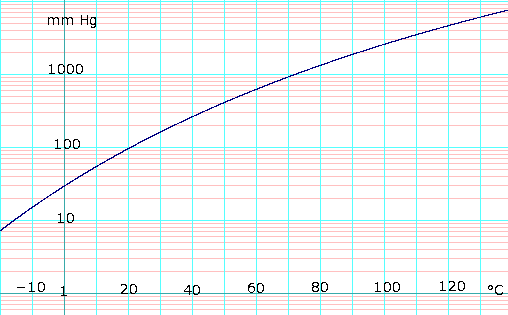
Log_{10} of methanol vapor pressure vs. temperature. Uses Antoine's equation: $\scriptstyle \log_{10} {P_{mmHg}} = 7.87863 - \frac {1473.11} {230.0+T}$ from Lange's Handbook of Chemistry 10th ed.

Here is a similar formula from the 67th edition of the CRC handbook. Note that the form of this formula as given is a fit to the Clausius–Clapeyron equation, which is a good theoretical starting point for calculating saturation vapor pressures:

log_{10}(P) = −(0.05223)a/T + b, where P is in mmHg, T is in kelvins, a = 38324, and b = 8.8017.

== Properties of aqueous methanol solutions ==
Data obtained from Lange's Handbook of Chemistry, 10th ed. and CRC Handbook of Chemistry and Physics 44th ed. The annotation, d a°C/b°C, indicates density of solution at temperature a divided by density of pure water at temperature b known as specific gravity. When temperature b is 4 °C, density of water is 0.999972 g/mL.

% wt methanol	% vol methanol	d 15.6 °C/4 °C	d 0 °C/4 °C	d 10 °C/4 °C	d 20 °C/4 °C	freezing temp °C
0	0	0.99908	0.99984	0.99970	0.99820	0.0
1	1.25	0.99728	0.9981	0.9980	0.9965
2	2.50	0.99543	0.9963	0.9962	0.9943
3	3.75	0.99370	0.9946	0.9945	0.9931
3.9	5	0.9938				−2.2
4	4.99	0.99198	0.9930	0.9929	0.9914
5	6.22	0.99029	0.9914	0.9912	0.9896
6	7.45	0.98864	0.9899	0.9896	0.9880
7	8.68	0.98701	0.9884	0.9881	0.9863
8	9.91	0.98547	0.9870	0.9865	0.9847
8.1	10	0.9872				−5.0
9	11.13	0.98547	0.9856	0.9849	0.9831
10	12.35	0.98241	0.9842	0.9834	0.9815
11	13.56	0.98093	0.9829	0.9820	0.9799
12	14.77	0.97945	0.9816	0.9805	0.9784
12.2	15	0.9810				−8.3
13	15.98	0.97802	0.9804	0.9791	0.9768
14	17.18	0.97660	0.9792	0.9778	0.9754
15	18.38	0.97518	0.9780	0.9764	0.9740
16	19.58	0.97377	0.9769	0.9751	0.9725
16.4	20	0.975				−11.7
17	20.77	0.97237	0.9758	0.9739	0.9710
18	21.96	0.97096	0.9747	0.9726	0.9696
19	23.15	0.96955	0.9736	0.9713	0.9681
20	24.33	0.96814	0.9725	0.9700	0.9666
20.6	25	0.968				−15.6
21	25.51	0.96673	0.9714	0.9687	0.9651
22	26.69	0.96533	0.9702	0.9673	0.9636
23	27.86	0.96392	0.9690	0.9660	0.9622
24	29.03	0.96251	0.9678	0.9646	0.9607
24.9	30	0.964				−20.0
25	30.19	0.96108	0.9666	0.9632	0.9592
26	31.35	0.95963	0.9654	0.9628	0.9576
27	32.51	0.95817	0.9642	0.9604	0.9562
28	33.66	0.95668	0.9629	0.9590	0.9546
29	34.81	0.95518	0.9616	0.9575	0.9531
29.2	35	0.957				−25.0
30	35.95	0.95366	0.9604	0.9560	0.9515
31	37.09	0.95213	0.9590	0.9546	0.9499
32	38.22	0.95056	0.9576	0.9531	0.9483
33	39.35	0.94896	0.9563	0.9516	0.9466
33.6	40	0.950				−30.0
34	40.48	0.94734	0.9549	0.9500	0.9450
35	41.59	0.94570	0.9534	0.9484	0.9433
36	42.71	0.94404	0.9520	0.9469	0.9416
37	43.82	0.94237	0.9505	0.9453	0.9398
38	44.92	0.94067	0.9490	0.9437	0.9381	−35.6
39	46.02	0.93894	0.9475	0.9420	0.9363
40	47.11	0.93720	0.9459	0.9403	0.9345
41	48.20	0.93543	0.9443	0.9387	0.9327
42	49.28	0.93365	0.9427	0.9370	0.9309
43	50.35	0.93185	0.9411	0.9352	0.9290
44	51.42	0.93001	0.9395	0.9334	0.9272
45	52.49	0.92815	0.9377	0.9316	0.9252
46	53.54	0.92627	0.9360	0.9298	0.9234
47	54.60	0.92436	0.9342	0.9279	0.9214
48	55.64	0.92242	0.9324	0.9260	0.9196
49	56.68	0.92048	0.9306	0.9240	0.9176
50	57.71	0.91852	0.9287	0.9221	0.9156
51	58.74	0.91653	0.9269	0.9202	0.9135
52	59.76	0.91451	0.9250	0.9182	0.9114
53	60.77	0.91248	0.9230	0.9162	0.9094
54	61.78	0.91044	0.9211	0.9142	0.9073
55	62.78	0.90839	0.9191	0.9122	0.9052
56	63.78	0.90631	0.9172	0.9101	0.9032
57	64.77	0.90421	0.9151	0.9080	0.9010
58	65.75	0.90210	0.9131	0.9060	0.8988
59	66.73	0.89996	0.9111	0.9039	0.8968
60	67.69	0.89781	0.9090	0.9018	0.8946
61	68.65	0.89563	0.9068	0.8998	0.8924
62	69.61	0.89341	0.9046	0.8977	0.8902
63	70.55	0.89117	0.9024	0.8955	0.8879
64	71.49	0.88890	0.9002	0.8933	0.8856
65	72.42	0.88662	0.8980	0.8911	0.8834
66	73.34	0.88433	0.8958	0.8888	0.8811
67	74.26	0.88203	0.8935	0.8865	0.8787
68	75.17	0.87971	0.8913	0.8842	0.8763
69	76.08	0.87739	0.8891	0.8818	0.8738
70	76.98	0.87507	0.8869	0.8794	0.8715
71	77.86	0.87271	0.8847	0.8770	0.8690
72	78.75	0.87033	0.8824	0.8747	0.8665
73	79.62	0.86792	0.8801	0.8724	0.8641
74	80.48	0.86546	0.8778	0.8699	0.8616
75	81.34	0.86300	0.8754	0.8676	0.8592
76	82.18	0.86051	0.8729	0.8651	0.8567
77	83.02	0.85801	0.8705	0.8626	0.8542
78	83.86	0.85551	0.8680	0.8602	0.8518
79	84.68	0.85300	0.8657	0.8577	0.8494
80	85.50	0.85048	0.8634	0.8551	0.8469
81	86.31	0.84794	0.8610	0.8527	0.8446
82	87.11	0.84536	0.8585	0.8501	0.8420
83	87.90	0.84274	0.8560	0.8475	0.8394
84	88.68	0.84009	0.8535	0.8449	0.8366
85	89.45	0.83742	0.8510	0.8422	0.8340
86	90.21	0.83475	0.8483	0.8394	0.8314
87	90.97	0.83207	0.8456	0.8367	0.8286
88	91.72	0.82937	0.8428	0.8340	0.8258
89	92.46	0.82667	0.8400	0.8314	0.8230
90	93.19	0.82396	0.8374	0.8287	0.8202
91	93.92	0.82124	0.8347	0.8261	0.8174
92	94.63	0.81849	0.8320	0.8234	0.8146
93	95.33	0.81568	0.8293	0.8208	0.8118
94	96.02	0.81285	0.8266	0.8180	0.8090
95	96.70	0.80999	0.8240	0.8152	0.8062
96	97.37	0.80713	0.8212	0.8124	0.8034
97	98.04	0.80428	0.8186	0.8096	0.8005
98	98.70	0.80143	0.8158	0.8068	0.7976
99	99.35	0.79859	0.8130	0.8040	0.7948
100	100	0.792	0.8102	0.8009	0.7917	−97.8
% wt methanol	% vol methanol	d 15.6 °C/4 °C	d 0 °C/4 °C	d 10 °C/4 °C	d 20 °C/4 °C	freezing temp °C

== Distillation data ==
Vapor–liquid equilibrium of methanol/water P = 760 mm Hg; T = 72.4 °C − 100.0 °C
BP temp. °C	% by mole methanol
BP temp. °C	liquid	vapor
100.00	0.0	0.0
99.25	0.5840	4.5705
96.9	1.2	11.4
95.7	2.6	15.7
92.2	5.0	29.3
90.15	7.38	36.65
87.5	10.2	43.0
86.50	11.76	48.55
84.8	14.0	51.4
84.3	15.0	52.2
82.9	17.5	56.0
81.5	20.0	59.0
78.0	30.0	67.5
75.4	40.0	73.5
73.7	47.3	76.5
72.6	52.6	79.4
72.4	54.0	80.1

Vapor–liquid equilibrium of methanol/water P = 760 mm Hg; T = 64.6 °C − 72.0 °C
BP temp. °C	% by mole methanol
BP temp. °C	liquid	vapor
72.0	56.5	80.5
71.5	58.5	81.6
71.4	60.0	83.1
70.6	66.2	85.7
69.9	67.5	86.5
69.6	70.0	87.4
69.1	71.4	87.8
67.8	80.0	91.8
66.9	85.0	93.0
66.50	88.08	94.17
66.2	89.0	95.6
66.1	90.0	96.1
65.7	92.0	96.5
65.4	95.0	98.1
64.95	96.57	95.69
64.70	98.71	97.78
64.6	100.0	100.0

Vapor–liquid equilibrium of methanol/ethanol P = 760 mm Hg
BP temp. °C	% by mole methanol
BP temp. °C	liquid	vapor
78.3	0.0	0.0
76.6	13.4	18.3
75.0	24.2	32.6
73.6	32.0	42.8
72.3	40.1	52.9
71.7	43.5	56.6
70.0	54.2	67.6
68.6	65.2	75.9
67.7	72.8	81.3
66.9	79.0	85.8
66.6	81.4	87.5
65.8	87.3	91.9
65.6	91.0	93.7
64.6	100.0	100.0

This box:
- Except where noted otherwise, data relate to Standard temperature and pressure.
- Reliability of data general note.
