= Rockquiem =

International rock music show based on Mozart's music

Rockquiem – based on W. A. Mozart (2003) is an international music and dance show for singers, chorus, dancers, rock band and orchestra combining the music of Wolfgang Amadeus Mozart's Requiem Mass K. 626 with contemporary rock music.

Initiated by Czech musician and producer Daniel Landa and Bolzano theatre principal Manfred Schweigkofler, Rockquiem was composed in 2002 by Stefan Wurz.

The world premiere was held at the famous Smetana Hall of the Obecní dům (Municipal House), Prague, on August 3, 2003. The theatrical version premiered on April 8, 2004, at the Nuovo Teatro Comunale, Bolzano.

Rockquiem was later successfully performed in several European countries including the Szeged Open Air Festival in Hungary and the Bergen Opera Festival in Norway.
