= Chemoselectivity =

Preferential outcome of a chemical reaction

Chemoselectivity is the preferential reaction of a chemical reagent with one of two or more different functional groups.

In a chemoselective system, a reagent in the presence of an aldehyde and an ester would mostly target the aldehyde, even if it has the option to react with the ester. Chemoselectivity is an area of interest in chemistry because scientists want to recreate complex biological compounds, such as natural products, and make specific modifications to them.

Most chemical reactions bring together atoms that have negative charge character and atoms that have positive charge character. When evaluating possible reaction outcomes, several factors should be considered. The most important being identifying where in the molecule has the most electron density and where has the least. This analysis gives a good prediction of reactivity, but more factors such as connectivity, atomic orbital overlap, solvent effects, and the addition of supporting reagents can affect the reaction outcome.

== Electrophilicity ==
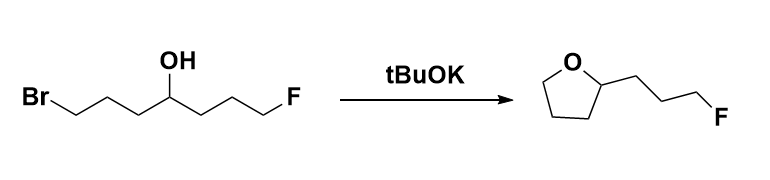
The carbon-bromine bond is more reactive than the carbon-fluorine bond

If a molecule has several potential reactive sites, the reaction will occur in the most reactive one. When comparing carbon-halogen bonds, lighter halogens such as fluorine and chlorine have a better orbital overlap with carbon, which makes the bond stronger. Bromine and iodine, on the other hand, are bigger and therefore can undergo chemical reactions more easily.

=== Carbonyl functional groups ===
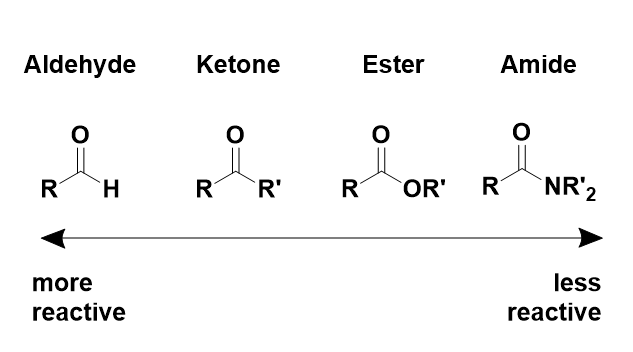
Reactivity ranking of common carbonyl functional groups

The reactivity of carbonyls can be ranked by evaluating how much electron density the neighbouring atoms donate to the carbonyl carbon. Aldehydes are the most reactive because the hydrogen next to the carbon is small and only has one electron, and therefore does not provide steric or electronic shielding. By switching the hydrogen for a carbon group, making a ketone, the carbonyl becomes less reactive since the carbon is bigger and has more electrons. The most stable carbonyls are the ones with atoms with lone pairs next to them, such as amides and esters. Since the electrons are not participating in bonding, they are not as restricted and can readily donate to the carbon. Amides are less reactive than esters because oxygen is more electronegative than nitrogen and therefore it concentrates more of the electron density on itself. Chemists take advantage of the stability of amides by using them as protecting groups to shield sites that they don't want to react.

== Metal-assisted selectivity ==
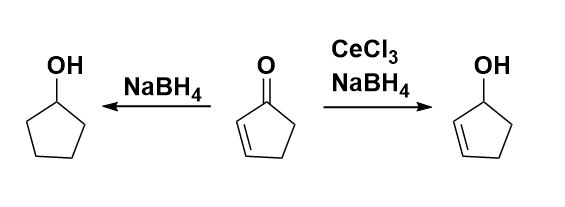
Selective and unselective reduction of a conjugated ketone

Some reagents have higher affinity with specific functional groups, which can be used to direct reactivity. A famous example is the Luche Reduction, where an oxophilic metal makes the carbonyl of a conjugated ketone more reactive and directs the reducing agent. On the other hand, copper organometallics have high affinity with carbon-carbon multiple bonds and are used for conjugate addition of nucleophiles into a conjugated ketone.

== Reducing and oxidizing reagents ==
Different hydride reagents have different reactivity towards functional groups so they can be selected according to the desired outcome. Examples include the greater relative chemoselectivity of sodium borohydride versus lithium aluminium hydride for the organic reduction of 4-nitro-2-chlorobenzonitrile to the corresponding aniline, 4-amino-2-chlorobenzonitrile. In another example, the compound 4-methoxyacetophenone is oxidized by bleach at the ketone group at high pH (forming the carboxylic acid) and oxidized by EAS (to the aryl chloride) at low pH.

== See also ==
- Regioselectivity
- Stereoselectivity
