= Zhan catalyst =

Zhan Catalyst-1B
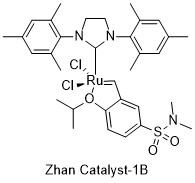

Names
- IUPAC name Dichloro(1,3-bis(2,4,6-trimethylphenyl)-2-imidazolidinylidene)((5-((dimethylamino)sulfonyl)-2-(1-methylethoxy-O)phenyl)methylene-C)ruthenium(II)

Identifiers
CAS Number	918870-76-5
3D model (JSmol)	Interactive image
ChemSpider	24723209
PubChem CID	59856477
- InChI: InChI=1S/C21H26N2.C12H17NO3S.2ClH.Ru/c1-14-9-16(3)20(17(4)10-14)22-7-8-23(13-22)21-18(5)11-15(2)12-19(21)6;1-9(2)16-12-7-6-11(8-10(12)3)17(14,15)13(4)5;;;/h9-12H,7-8H2,1-6H3;3,6-9H,1-2,4-5H3;2*1H;/q;;;;+2/p-2 Key: OXLURKCRXVAJQS-UHFFFAOYSA-L
- SMILES: Cl[Ru]2(Cl)(C0N(-c1c(C)cc(C)cc1C)CCN0c1c(C)cc(C)cc1C)=Cc1cc(S(=O)(=O)N(C)C)ccc1[O+]2C(C)C

Properties
Chemical formula	C_{33}H_{43}Cl_{2}N_{3}O_{3}RuS
Molar mass	733.75 g·mol^{−1}
Appearance	Green solid

Hazards
- GHS labelling
Pictograms	(GHS07: Exclamation mark)
Signal word	Warning
Hazard statements	H302, H315, H319, H335
Precautionary statements	P261, P264, P264+P265, P270, P271, P280, P301+P317, P302+P352, P304+P340, P305+P351+P338, P319, P321, P330, P332+P317, P337+P317, P362+P364, P403+P233, P405, P501
- Except where otherwise noted, data are given for materials in their standard state (at 25 °C [77 °F], 100 kPa). verify (what is ?) Infobox references

Zhan Catalyst-1C
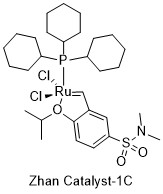

Names
- IUPAC name Dichloro((5-((dimethylamino)sulfonyl)-2-(1-methylethoxy-O)phenyl)methylene-C)(tricyclohexylphosphine)ruthenium(IV)

Identifiers
CAS Number	918871-44-0
3D model (JSmol)	Interactive image
ChemSpider	24723353
PubChem CID	117065271
- InChI: InChI=1S/C18H33P.C12H17NO3S.2ClH.Ru/c1-4-10-16(11-5-1)19(17-12-6-2-7-13-17)18-14-8-3-9-15-18;1-9(2)16-12-7-6-11(8-10(12)3)17(14,15)13(4)5;;;/h16-18H,1-15H2;3,6-9H,1-2,4-5H3;2*1H;/q;;;;+2/p-2 Key: GQGVRAHMQZBHRC-UHFFFAOYSA-L
- SMILES: Cl[Ru-2]2(Cl)([P+](C1CCCCC1)(C1CCCCC1)C1CCCCC1)=Cc1cc(S(=O)(=O)N(C)C)ccc1[O+]2C(C)C

Properties
Chemical formula	C_{30}H_{50}Cl_{2}NO_{3}PRuS
Molar mass	707.74 g·mol^{−1}
Appearance	Brown solid
Melting point	145 to 155 °C (293 to 311 °F; 418 to 428 K)
- Except where otherwise noted, data are given for materials in their standard state (at 25 °C [77 °F], 100 kPa). Infobox references

A Zhan catalyst is a type of ruthenium-based organometallic complex used in olefin metathesis. This class of chemicals is named after the chemist who first synthesized them, Zheng-Yun J. Zhan.

These catalysts are ruthenium complexes with functionally substituted alkoxybenzylidene carbene ligands, which can be chemically bonded to the surface of resins, PEG chains, and polymers. Like the structurally similar Hoveyda-Grubbs catalyst, they contain an isopropoxystyrene moiety, but include an extra electron-withdrawing sulfonamide group attached to the carbon para to the phenol oxygen. Of the three catalysts, Zhan Catalyst-1B and -1C both contain a dimethylsulfonamide moiety attached to the aryl ring, while Zhan Catalyst-II is connected to a resin via a sulfonamide linker.

== History ==
The Zhan catalysts were inspired by previous work in the olefin metathesis field. Robert H. Grubbs first reported the first and second generation of Ru catalysts in 1992, with good metathesis activity. However, the catalysts containing the tricyclohexylphospine ligand were unstable to air and water, and the catalytic activity is not good enough for some multiple substituted olefin substrates.

In 1999, Amir H. Hoveyda showed that alkoxybenzylidene ligand based Ru catalysts offered higher activity and better stability than their Grubbs counterparts without these ligands. Later, Grela (2002) and Blechert (2003) further improved catalyst activity by incorporating substitution to Hoveyda’s alkoxybenzylidene ligands. Zhan’s catalysts were first reported in 2007, and include electron-withdrawing groups like dimethylsulfonamide on the aryl ring. Zhan's second generation catalysts are also tethered to a resin or PEG-linked support via the sulfonamide group on the isopropoxystyrene.

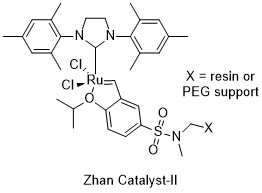
Zhan Catalyst-II

As with other Grubbs-type catalysts with modified chelating benzylidenes, after one catalytic turnover, the chelate is no longer associated with the propagating catalyst, meaning that the initiate rate, the rate of o-alkoxystyrene rechelation, and the rates of various catalyst decomposition events are the factors that differ between the Zhan catalysts and the parent Hoveyda–Grubbs catalysts. A mechanistic study by Plenio and coworkers in 2012 suggested that the Zhan compounds, like other Hoveyda-type catalysts, initiate by competing dissociative and interchange mechanisms, with the relative activation energies being a function of catalyst structure, olefin identity, and reaction conditions. However, nobody had been able to rigorously establish through experimentation how the various changes to the structure affected catalytic activity of the complex. Engle, Luo, Houk, Grubbs, and coworkers developed a model that could rationalize initiation rates of ruthenium olefin metathesis catalysts with chelated benzylidenes, using a combination of organometallic synthesis, reaction kinetics, NMR spectroscopy, X-ray crystallography, and DFT calculations.

== Preparation ==
In order to make the catalysts, the pre-complex is treated with CuCl and the isopropoxystyrene ligand.

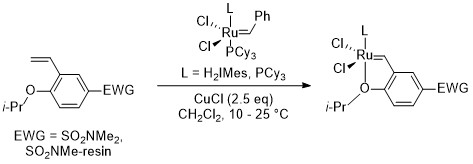
Synthesis of the Zhan catalysts

The isopropoxystyrene ligand is prepared using an ortho-vinylation of the phenol with ethyne, using conditions first proposed by Masahiko Yamaguchi in 1998. Here, SnCl_{4} and Bu_{3}N were added to ethyne to generate stannylacetylene, which is the active vinylating species in this C–C bond formation. After coupling, the phenol can be alkylated using i-PrBr and a base.

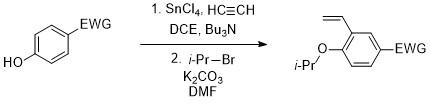
Synthesis of the Zhan isopropoxystyrene ligand

== Recycling ==
The Zhan catalysts can be recovered and recycled by simple precipitation or filtration. Zhan Catalyst-1B and -1C are soluble in dichloromethane, dichloroethane, chloroform, ether, and other solvents, but insoluble in methanol, ethanol, and other alcohols. Zhan Catalyst-II is linked to a resin- and PEG-linked support, offering a great advantage in recyclable utility, and leaving little or no trace of metal contamination within the product of olefin metathesis reactions. These catalysts can then be reused.
