= Methanol =

CH3OH; simplest possible alcohol

Space filling model of methanol
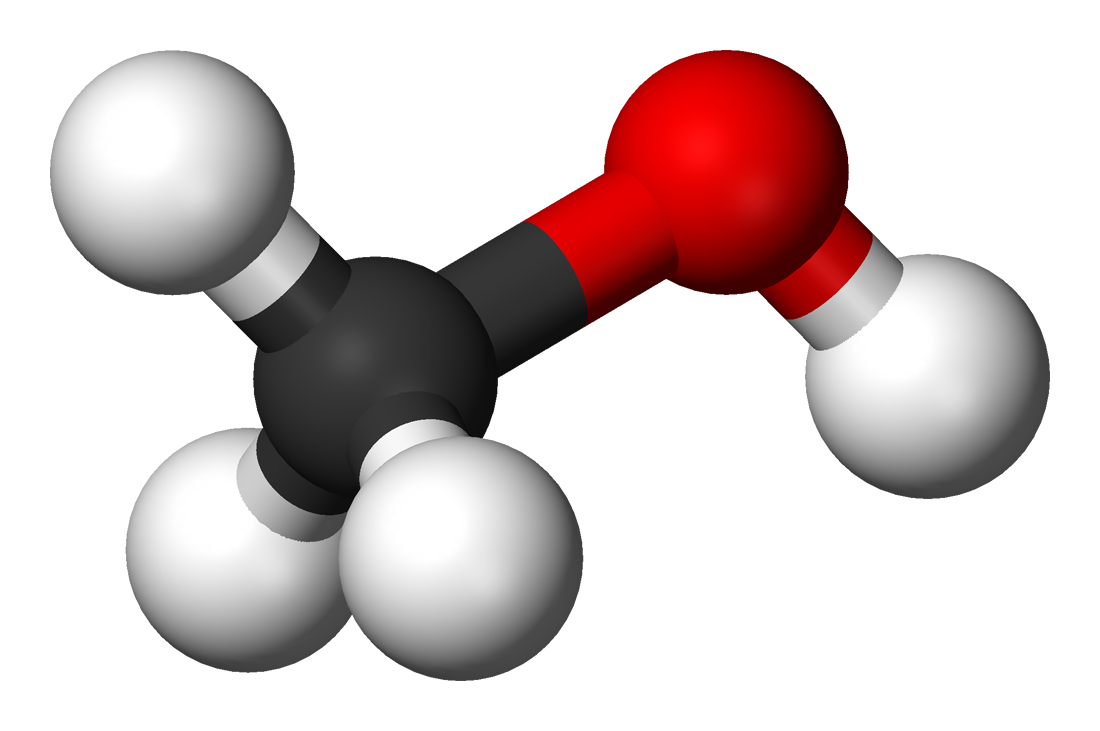
Ball-and-stick model of methanol
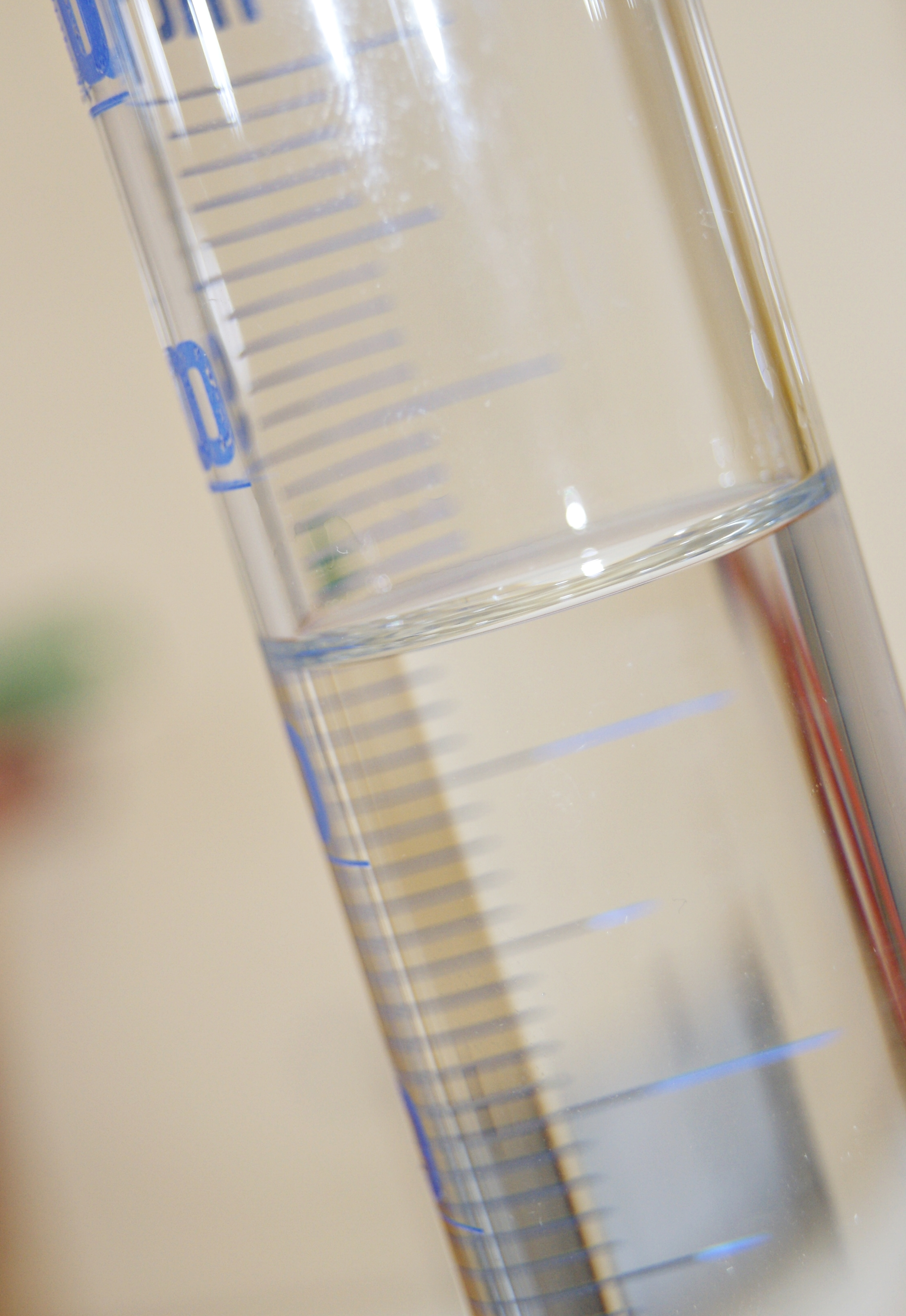
- A sample of methanol

Names
- Preferred IUPAC name Methanol
- Other names: Carbinol; Columbian spirits; Hydroxymethane; Methyl alcohol; Methyl hydrate; Methyl hydroxide; Methylic alcohol; Methylol; Methylene hydrate, primary alcohol; Pyroligneous spirit; Wood alcohol; Wood naphtha; Wood spirit

Identifiers
CAS Number	67-56-1
3D model (JSmol)	Interactive image
Abbreviations	MeOH
Beilstein Reference	1098229
ChEBI	CHEBI:17790
ChEMBL	ChEMBL14688
ChemSpider	864
ECHA InfoCard	100.000.599
EC Number	200-659-6
Gmelin Reference	449
KEGG	D02309
MeSH	Methanol
PubChem CID	887
RTECS number	PC1400000
UNII	Y4S76JWI15
UN number	1230
CompTox Dashboard (EPA)	DTXSID2021731
- InChI: InChI=1S/CH4O/c1-2/h2H,1H3 Key: OKKJLVBELUTLKV-UHFFFAOYSA-N; InChI=1/CH4O/c1-2/h2H,1H3 Key: OKKJLVBELUTLKV-UHFFFAOYAX
- SMILES: CO

Properties
Chemical formula	CH_{3}OH
Molar mass	32.042 g·mol^{−1}
Appearance	Colourless liquid
Odor	Faint and similar to ethanol
Density	0.792 g/cm^{3}
Melting point	−97.6 °C (−143.7 °F; 175.6 K)
Boiling point	64.7 °C (148.5 °F; 337.8 K)
Solubility in water	miscible
log P	−0.69
Vapor pressure	13.02 kPa (at 20 °C)
Acidity (pK_{a})	15.5
Conjugate acid	Methyloxonium
Conjugate base	Methanolate
Magnetic susceptibility (χ)	−21.40·10^{−6} cm^{3}/mol
Refractive index (n_{D})	1.33141
Viscosity	0.545 mPa·s (at 25 °C)
Dipole moment	1.69 D

Thermochemistry
Heat of combustion, higher value (HHV)	725.7 kJ/mol, 173.4 kcal/mol, 5.77 kcal/g

Hazards
- Occupational safety and health (OHS/OSH)
Main hazards	Methanol and its vapours are flammable. Moderately toxic for small animals – Highly toxic to large animals and humans (in high concentrations) – May be fatal/lethal or cause blindness and damage to the liver, kidneys, and heart if swallowed – Toxicity effects from repeated over exposure have an accumulative effect on the central nervous system, especially the optic nerve – Symptoms may be delayed, become severe after 12 to 18 hours, and linger for several days after exposure
- GHS labelling
Pictograms	(GHS02: Flammable) (GHS06: Toxic) (GHS08: Health hazard)
Signal word	Danger
Hazard statements	H225, H301, H302, H305, H311, H331, H370
Precautionary statements	P210, P233, P235, P240, P241, P242, P243, P260, P264, P270, P271, P280, P301+P330+P331, P302+P352, P303+P361+P353, P304+P340, P305+P351+P338, P307+P311, P310, P311, P312, P337+P313, P361, P363, P370+P378, P403+P233, P405, P501
NFPA 704 (fire diamond)	1 3 0
Flash point	11 to 12 °C (52 to 54 °F; 284 to 285 K)
Autoignition temperature	470 °C (878 °F; 743 K); 385 °C (725 °F; 658 K)
Explosive limits	6–36%
- Lethal dose or concentration (LD, LC)
LD_{50} (median dose)	5628 mg/kg (rat, oral); 7300 mg/kg (mouse, oral); 12880 mg/kg (rat, oral); 14200 mg/kg (rabbit, oral)
LC_{50} (median concentration)	64,000 ppm (rat, 4 h)
LC_{Lo} (lowest published)	33,082 ppm (cat, 6h); 37,594 ppm (mouse, 2h)
- NIOSH (US health exposure limits)
PEL (Permissible)	TWA 200 ppm (260 mg/m^{3})
REL (Recommended)	TWA 200 ppm (260 mg/m^{3}) ST 250 ppm (325 mg/m^{3}) [skin]
IDLH (Immediate danger)	6000 ppm
- Safety data sheet (SDS)

Related compounds
Related compounds	Methanethiol; Silanol; Ethanol

Supplementary data page
- Methanol (data page)
- Except where otherwise noted, data are given for materials in their standard state (at 25 °C [77 °F], 100 kPa). verify (what is ?) Infobox references

Methanol (also called methyl alcohol, wood alcohol, and wood spirit, amongst other names) is an organic chemical compound and the simplest aliphatic alcohol, with the chemical formula CH_{3}OH (a methyl group linked to a hydroxyl group, often abbreviated as MeOH). It is a light, volatile, colorless and flammable liquid with a distinctive alcoholic odor similar to that of ethanol (potable alcohol), but is more acutely toxic than the latter. Methanol acquired the name wood alcohol because it was once produced through destructive distillation of wood. Today, methanol is mainly produced industrially by hydrogenation of carbon monoxide.

Methanol consists of a methyl group linked to a polar hydroxyl group. With more than 20 million tons produced annually, it is used as a precursor to other commodity chemicals, including formaldehyde, acetic acid, methyl tert-butyl ether, methyl benzoate, anisole, peroxyacids, as well as a host of more specialized chemicals.

== Occurrence ==
Small amounts of methanol are present in normal, healthy human individuals. One study found a mean of 0.45 ppm in the exhaled breath of test subjects. The mean endogenous methanol in humans of 0.45 g/d may be metabolized from pectin found in fruit; one kilogram of apple produces up to 1.4 g of pectin (0.6 g of methanol.)

Methanol is produced by anaerobic bacteria and phytoplankton.

=== Interstellar medium ===
Methanol is also found in abundant quantities in star-forming regions of space and is used in astronomy as a marker for such regions. It is detected through its spectral emission lines.

In 2006, astronomers using the MERLIN array of radio telescopes at Jodrell Bank Observatory discovered a large cloud of methanol in space 0.463 terametres (288 million miles) across. In 2016, astronomers detected methanol in a planet-forming disc around the young star TW Hydrae using the Atacama Large Millimeter Array radio telescope.

== History ==
In their embalming process, the ancient Egyptians used a mixture of substances, including methanol, which they obtained from the pyrolysis of wood. Pure methanol, however, was first isolated in 1661 by Robert Boyle, when he produced it via the distillation of buxus (boxwood). It later became known as "pyroxylic spirit". In 1834, the French chemists Jean-Baptiste Dumas and Eugene Peligot determined its elemental composition.

They also introduced the word "methylène" to organic chemistry, forming it from Greek methy = "alcoholic liquid" + hȳlē = "forest, wood, timber, material". "Methylène" designated a "radical" that was about 14% hydrogen by weight and contained one carbon atom. This would be CH_{2}, but at the time carbon was thought to have an atomic weight only six times that of hydrogen, so they gave the formula as CH. They then called wood alcohol (l'esprit de bois) "bihydrate de méthylène" (bihydrate because they thought the formula was C_{4}H_{8}O_{4} or (CH)_{4}(H_{2}O)_{2}). The term "methyl" was derived in about 1840 by back-formation from "methylene", and was then applied to describe "methyl alcohol". This was shortened to "methanol" in 1892 by the International Conference on Chemical Nomenclature. The suffix -yl, which, in organic chemistry, forms names of carbon groups, is from the word methyl.

French chemist Paul Sabatier presented the first process that could be used to produce methanol synthetically in 1905. This process suggested that carbon dioxide and hydrogen could be reacted to produce methanol. German chemists Alwin Mittasch and Mathias Pier, working for Badische-Anilin & Soda-Fabrik (BASF), developed a means to convert synthesis gas (a mixture of carbon monoxide, carbon dioxide, and hydrogen) into methanol and received a patent. According to Bozzano and Manenti, BASF's process was first utilized in Leuna, Germany in 1923. Operating conditions consisted of "high" temperatures (between 300 and 400 °C) and pressures (between 250 and 350 atm) with a zinc/chromium oxide catalyst.

US patent 1,569,775 was applied for on 4 September 1924 and issued on 12 January 1926 to BASF; the process used a chromium and manganese oxide catalyst with extremely vigorous conditions: pressures ranging from 50 to 220 atm, and temperatures up to 450 °C. Modern methanol production has been made more efficient through use of catalysts (commonly copper) capable of operating at lower pressures. The modern low pressure methanol (LPM) process was developed by ICI in the late 1960s with the technology patent long since expired.

During World War II, methanol was used as a fuel in several German military rocket designs, under the name M-Stoff, and in a roughly 50/50 mixture with hydrazine, known as C-Stoff. The Luftwaffe used 50/50 methanol-water solution MW 50 injected in the inlet manifold for anti-detonation in supercharged aircraft engines.

The use of methanol as a motor fuel received attention during the oil crises of the 1970s. By the mid-1990s, over 20,000 methanol flexible fuel vehicles (FFVs) capable of operating on methanol or gasoline were introduced in the US. In addition, low levels of methanol were blended in gasoline fuels sold in Europe during much of the 1980s and early-1990s. Automakers stopped building methanol FFVs by the late-1990s, switching their attention to ethanol-fueled vehicles. While the methanol FFV program was a technical success, rising methanol pricing in the mid- to late-1990s during a period of slumping gasoline pump prices diminished interest in methanol fuels.

In the early 1970s, a process was developed by Mobil for producing gasoline fuel from methanol.

Between the 1960s and 1980s methanol emerged as a precursor to the feedstock chemicals acetic acid and acetic anhydride. These processes include the Monsanto acetic acid synthesis, Cativa process, and Tennessee Eastman acetic anhydride process.

== Applications ==
=== Production of formaldehyde, acetic acid, methyl tert-butyl ether ===
Methanol is primarily converted to formaldehyde, which is widely used in many areas, especially polymers. The conversion entails oxidation:

2 CH_{3}OH + O_{2} → 2 CH_{2}O + 2 H_{2}O

Acetic acid can be produced from methanol.

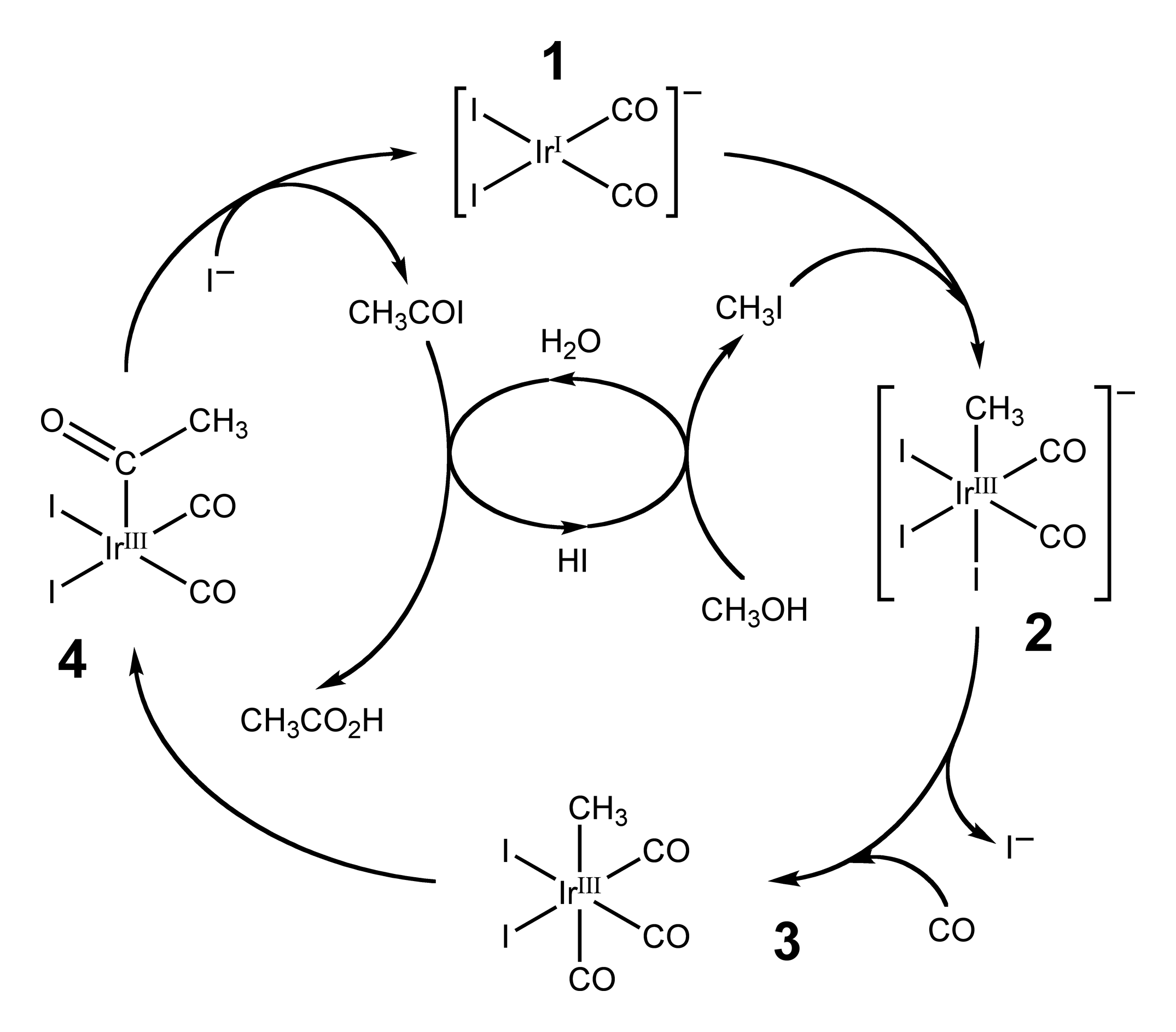
The Cativa process converts methanol into acetic acid.

Methanol and isobutene are combined to give methyl tert-butyl ether (MTBE). MTBE is a major octane booster in gasoline.

=== Methanol to hydrocarbons, olefins, gasoline ===
Condensation of methanol to produce hydrocarbons and even aromatic systems is the basis of several technologies related to gas to liquids. These include methanol-to-hydrocarbons (MtH), methanol to gasoline (MtG), methanol to olefins (MtO), and methanol to propylene (MtP). These conversions are catalyzed by zeolites as heterogeneous catalysts. The MtG process was once commercialized at Motunui in New Zealand.

=== Gasoline additive ===
The European Fuel Quality Directive allows fuel producers to blend up to 3% methanol, with an equal amount of cosolvent, with gasoline sold in Europe. In 2019, it is estimated that China used as much as 7 million tons of methanol as transportation fuels, representing over 5% of their fuel pool.

=== Other chemicals ===
Methanol is the precursor to most simple methylamines, methyl halides, and methyl ethers. Methyl esters are produced from methanol, including the transesterification of fats and production of biodiesel via transesterification.

=== Niche and potential uses ===
==== Energy carrier ====
Methanol is a promising energy carrier because, as a liquid, it is easier to store than hydrogen and natural gas. Its energy density is, however, lower than methane, per kg. Its combustion energy density is 15.6 MJ/L (LHV), whereas that of ethanol is 24 and gasoline is 33 MJ/L.

Further advantages for methanol is its ready biodegradability and low environmental toxicity. It does not persist in either aerobic (oxygen-present) or anaerobic (oxygen-absent) environments. The half-life for methanol in groundwater is just one to seven days, while many common gasoline components have half-lives in the hundreds of days (such as benzene at 10–730 days). Since methanol is miscible with water and biodegradable, it is unlikely to accumulate in groundwater, surface water, air or soil.

==== Fuel ====
Methanol is occasionally used to fuel internal combustion engines. It burns forming carbon dioxide and water:

2 CH_{3}OH + 3 O_{2} → 2 CO_{2} + 4 H_{2}O

Methanol fuel has been proposed for ground transportation. The chief advantage of a methanol economy is that it could be adapted to gasoline internal combustion engines with minimum modification to the engines and to the infrastructure that delivers and stores liquid fuel. Its energy density, however, is less than gasoline, meaning more frequent fill ups would be required. However, it is equivalent to super high-octane gasoline in horsepower, and most modern computer-controlled fuel injection systems can already use it.

Methanol is an alternative fuel for ships that helps the shipping industry meet increasingly strict emissions regulations. It significantly reduces emissions of sulfur oxides (SO_{x}), nitrogen oxides (NO_{x}) and particulate matter. Methanol can be used with high efficiency in marine diesel engines after minor modifications using a small amount of pilot fuel (dual fuel).

In China, methanol fuels industrial boilers, which are used extensively to generate heat and steam for various industrial applications and residential heating. Its use is displacing coal, which is under pressure from increasingly stringent environmental regulations.

Direct-methanol fuel cells are unique in their low temperature, atmospheric pressure operation, which lets them be greatly miniaturized. This, combined with the relatively easy and safe storage and handling of methanol, may open the possibility of fuel cell-powered consumer electronics, such as laptop computers and mobile phones.

Methanol is also a widely used fuel in camping and boating stoves. Methanol burns well in an unpressurized burner, so alcohol stoves are often very simple, sometimes little more than a cup to hold fuel. This lack of complexity makes them a favorite of hikers who spend extended time in the wilderness. Similarly, the alcohol can be gelled to reduce risk of leaking or spilling, as with the brand "Sterno".

Methanol is mixed with water and injected into high performance diesel and gasoline engines for an increase of power and a decrease in intake air temperature in a process known as water methanol injection.

==== Other applications ====
Methanol is used as a denaturant for ethanol, the product being known as denatured alcohol or methylated spirit. This was commonly used during the US prohibition to discourage consumption of bootlegged liquor, and ended up causing several deaths.

It is sometimes used as a fuel in alcohol lamps, portable fire pits and camping stoves.

Methanol is used as a solvent and as an antifreeze in pipelines and windshield washer fluid. Methanol was used as an automobile coolant antifreeze in the early 1900s. As of May 2018, methanol was banned in the EU for use in windscreen washing or defrosting due to its risk of human consumption as a result of 2012 Czech Republic methanol poisonings.

In some wastewater treatment plants, a small amount of methanol is added to wastewater to provide a carbon food source for the denitrifying bacteria, which convert nitrates to nitrogen gas and reduce the nitrification of sensitive aquifers.

Methanol is used as a destaining agent in polyacrylamide gel electrophoresis.

== Production ==
=== From synthesis gas ===
Carbon monoxide and hydrogen react over a catalyst to produce methanol. Today, the most widely used catalyst is a mixture of copper and zinc oxides, supported on alumina, as first used by ICI in 1966. At 5–10 MPa (50–100 atm) and 250 °C (482 °F), the reaction

CO + 2 H_{2} → CH_{3}OH

is characterized by high selectivity (>99.8%). The production of synthesis gas from methane produces three moles of hydrogen for every mole of carbon monoxide, whereas the synthesis consumes only two moles of hydrogen gas per mole of carbon monoxide. One way of dealing with the excess hydrogen is to inject carbon dioxide into the methanol synthesis reactor, where it, too, reacts to form methanol according to the equation

CO_{2} + 3 H_{2} → CH_{3}OH + H_{2}O

In terms of mechanism, the process occurs via initial conversion of CO into CO_{2}, which is then hydrogenated:

CO_{2} + 3 H_{2} → CH_{3}OH + H_{2}O

where the H_{2}O byproduct is recycled via the water-gas shift reaction

CO + H_{2}O → CO_{2} + H_{2}

This gives an overall reaction

CO + 2 H_{2} → CH_{3}OH

which is the same as listed above. In a process closely related to methanol production from synthesis gas, a feed of hydrogen and CO_{2} can be used directly. The main advantage of this process is that captured CO_{2} and hydrogen sourced from electrolysis could be used, removing the dependence on fossil fuels.

=== Biosynthesis ===
The catalytic conversion of methane to methanol is effected by enzymes including methane monooxygenases. These enzymes are mixed-function oxygenases, i.e. oxygenation is coupled with production of water and NAD^{+}:

CH_{4} + O_{2} + NADPH + H^{+} → CH_{3}OH + H_{2}O + NAD^{+}

Both Fe- and Cu-dependent enzymes have been characterized. Intense but largely fruitless efforts have been undertaken to emulate this reactivity. Methanol is more easily oxidized than is the feedstock methane, so the reactions tend not to be selective. Some strategies exist to circumvent this problem. Examples include Shilov systems and Fe- and Cu-containing zeolites. These systems do not necessarily mimic the mechanisms employed by metalloenzymes, but draw some inspiration from them. Active sites can vary substantially from those known in the enzymes. For example, a dinuclear active site is proposed in the sMMO enzyme, whereas a mononuclear iron (alpha-oxygen) is proposed in the Fe-zeolite.

Global emissions of methanol by plants are estimated at between 180 and 250 million tons per year. This is between two and three times larger than man-made industrial production of methanol.

== Green methanol ==
As of 2023, 0.2% of global methanol production is produced in ways that have relatively low greenhouse gas emissions; this is known as "green" methanol. Most green methanol is produced from gasification of biomass. Syngas is produced from biomass gasification and further converted into green methanol.

Another method of producing green methanol involves combining hydrogen, carbon dioxide, and a catalyst under high heat and pressure. To be classified as green methanol, the hydrogen must be produced using renewable electricity, and the carbon dioxide must be from carbon capture and storage, direct air capture or biomass of recent origin. Some definitions of green methanol specify that the carbon dioxide must be captured during the burning of bioenergy.

== Quality specifications and analysis ==
Methanol is available commercially in various purity grades. Commercial methanol is generally classified according to ASTM purity grades A and AA. Both grade A and grade AA purity are 99.85% methanol by weight. Grade "AA" methanol contains trace amounts of ethanol as well.

Methanol for chemical use normally corresponds to Grade AA. In addition to water, typical impurities include acetone and ethanol (which are very difficult to separate by distillation). UV-vis spectroscopy is a convenient method for detecting aromatic impurities. Water content can be determined by the Karl-Fischer titration.

== Safety ==
Methanol is highly flammable. Its vapours are slightly denser than air and can travel to a distant ignition source and ignite. Methanol fires should be extinguished with dry chemical, carbon dioxide, water spray or alcohol-resistant foam. Methanol flames are invisible in daylight.

=== Toxicity ===
Ingestion of as little as 4–15 mL of methanol has reportedly caused irreversible optic nerve damage (per Korean ToxInfo), and the oral LD50 for humans is estimated to be 56.2 grams of pure methanol. The reference dose for methanol is 0.5 mg/kg in a day. Toxic effects begin hours after ingestion, and antidotes can often prevent permanent damage. Because of its similarities in both appearance and odor to ethanol (the alcohol in beverages) or isopropyl alcohol, it is difficult to differentiate between the three.

Methanol is toxic by two mechanisms. First, methanol can be fatal due to effects on the central nervous system, acting as a central nervous system depressant in the same manner as ethanol poisoning. Second, in a process of toxication, it is metabolised to formic acid (which is present as the formate ion) via formaldehyde in a process initiated by the enzyme alcohol dehydrogenase in the liver. Methanol is converted to formaldehyde via alcohol dehydrogenase (ADH) and formaldehyde is converted to formic acid (formate) via aldehyde dehydrogenase (ALDH). The conversion to formate via ALDH proceeds completely, with no detectable formaldehyde remaining. Formate is toxic because it inhibits mitochondrial cytochrome c oxidase, causing hypoxia at the cellular level, and metabolic acidosis, among a variety of other metabolic disturbances.

Because of its toxic properties, methanol is frequently used as a denaturant additive (at about 10%) for ethanol manufactured for industrial uses. This addition of methanol exempts industrial ethanol (commonly known as "denatured alcohol" or "methylated spirit") from liquor excise taxation in the US and other countries. Outbreaks of methanol poisoning have occurred primarily due to the drinking of such denatured alcohol. This is more common in the developing world. It is worth noting that ethanol is a natural antidote to methanol poisoning. The ethanol present in such mixtures considerably attenuate the toxicity of methanol, increasing the doses required to cause symptoms and result in death. In 2013 more than 1700 cases occurred in the United States. Those affected are often adult men. Outcomes may be good with early treatment. The toxicity of methanol was described as early as 1856.

== See also ==
- Aminomethanol
- Methanol (data page)
- Methanol economy
- Trimethyl carbinol
