= Wirtz =

Wirtz may refer to:

== People ==
- A family of American businessmen best known as owners of the Chicago Blackhawks:
  - Arthur Wirtz (1901–1983), family patriarch and also owner of the Chicago Bulls
  - Bill Wirtz (1929–2007), Arthur's son; also briefly owner of the Bulls
  - Rocky Wirtz (1952–2023), Bill's son
  - Danny Wirtz (born 1977), Rocky's son
- Axel Wirtz (1957–2024), German government official and politician
- Cable A. Wirtz (1910–1980), justice of the Supreme Court of Hawaii
- Carl Wilhelm Wirtz (1876–1939), German astronomer
- Ferd Wirtz (1885–1947), Luxembourgish Olympic gymnast
- Florian Wirtz (born 2003), German football player
- Heinz Wirtz (born 1953), German football defender
- Jacques Wirtz (1924–2018), Belgian landscape gardener
- Karl Wirtz (1910–1994), German nuclear physicist
- Kris Wirtz (born 1969), Canadian figure skater
- Mark Wirtz (1943–2020), Alsatian musician and pop record producer
- Paul Wirtz (1958–2006), Canadian figure skater and skating coach
- Paul Wirtz (Swedish Pomerania) (died 17th-century), vice governour of Swedish Pomerania 1661–1664
- Patty Wirtz (born 1959), American voice actress
- Reverend Billy C. Wirtz (born 1954), American comedic recording artist
- Sean Wirtz (born 1979), Canadian figure skater
- William Wirtz (American football) (1887–1965), American college sports coach
- W. Willard Wirtz (1912–2010), U.S. administrator, cabinet officer, attorney, and law professor

== Places ==
- Wirtz (crater), impact crater on Mars
- Wirtz, Virginia (Franklin County), populated place in the United States

== Other ==
- Wirtz Corporation, an American holding company controlled by Arthur Wirtz and his descendants
