= Stefan Wurz =

German composer (born 1964)

Stefan Wurz (born October 24, 1964, in Karlsruhe, Germany) is a German composer who specialises in musical theatre.

== Biography ==
Having trained as a classical pianist as well as being a keyboarder and songwriter for various rock bands in his youth, Stefan Wurz studied musicology and composition at Karlsruhe University, where he also published a thesis on femmes fatales in music theatre.

Wurz was the first composer to set the Aldous Huxley classic Brave New World to music in 1994. In 2003, he was commissioned by Czech producer Daniel Landa to create Rockquiem, a rock and dance spectacle based on Mozart's Requiem, which premiered in Prague and Bolzano and was subsequently produced in several European countries. Current projects include The Virtual Mirror, a collaboration with German games creator Wolfgang Walk and American writer Mark Barrett.

== Compositions ==
=== Musical Theatre ===
- 2016: The Virtual Mirror – Rock ’n’ Games Cross Over Opera (WIP)
- 2010: Brandnacht - Jugendrockmusical
- 2007: Trurls Elektrobarde based on Stanislaw Lem
- 2006: Helle Nächte – romantic musical based on Fyodor Mikhailovich Dostoevsky's White Nights
- 2003: Da Capo al Fine – a Splatter Opera
- 2003: Rockquiem – based on W. A.Mozart
- 1994: Schöne neue Welt – rock musical based on Aldous Huxley's Brave New World
- 1993: Alice – rock musical after Lewis Carroll

=== Miscellaneous ===
- 2017: Crossing Bridges for State Theatre Kassel
- 2017: Scherben und Papa Haydn - string quartets for Quartett PLUS 1
- 2016: Golden Dragon, Golden Snake - Aria und Dance for Anging Normal University, Anqing, Anhui, China
- 2015: Time Changes - Concert for baglama, electric guitar, rockbound and orchestra
- 2015: Hannover Sounds - A Symphony of City Sounds for the State Opera House Hannover
- 2015: Pudiera ser...quizás - Tango for baritone and tango orchestra after lyrics by Mario Pinnola
- 2012: Baroque With You and Indian Smooth Criminal for voice and string quartet based on Songs performed by Michael Jackson
- 2011: Credo - a musical confrontation for church organ and electric guitar
- 2011: American Jesus Suite for string quartet based on Songs performed by Michael Jackson
- 2008: La Mariposa – tango nuevo
- 2004 Tenorissimo – 4 compositions and arrangements for Saimir Pirgu
- 2004 Martes Martes – miniature animated film opera
- 2004 Heile Welt – short film by Klemens Brysch – film score
- 2002: Heaven Fears Freedom – animated film by Chrysis Lengen - film score
- 1997: Spieler (Gambler) – animated film by Jan Schönfelder – film score
- 1992: Rilke-Lieder – Seven Poems by Rainer Maria Rilke
