= Wertz =

Wertz is a surname. Notable people with the surname include:

- Vic Wertz, American baseball player
- Matt Wertz, American singer-songwriter
- Ricki Wertz, American television personality
- George M. Wertz, American politician, teacher, and publisher
- David Frederick Wertz, American bishop
