= Potassium chlorochromate =

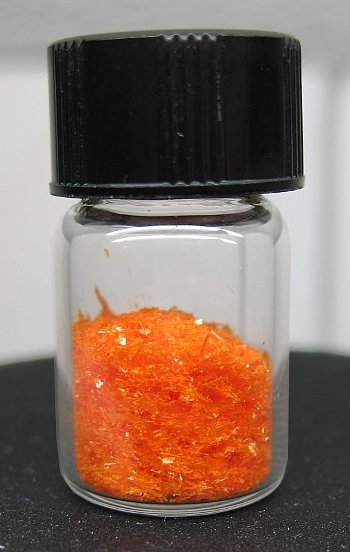

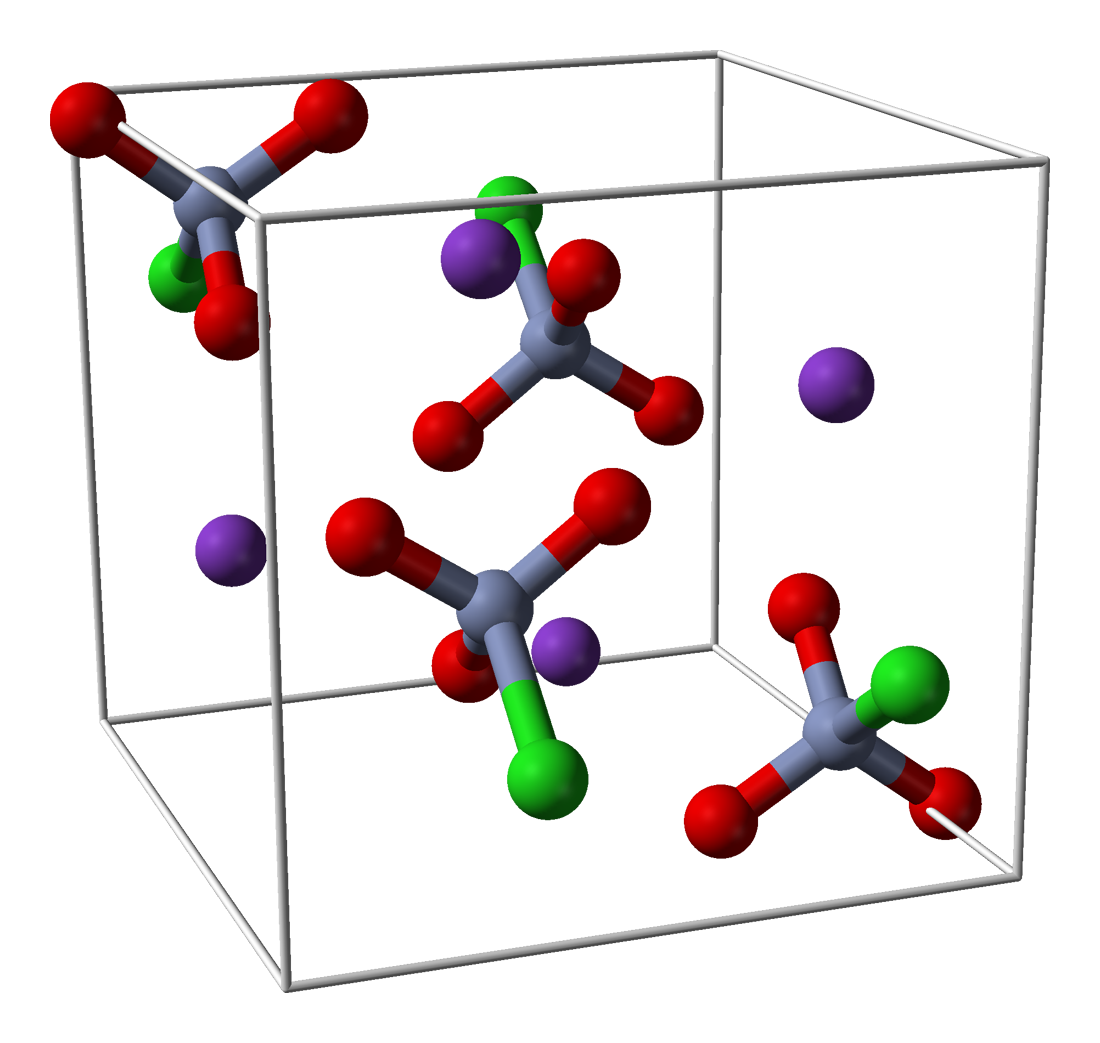

Names
- Other names Potassium trioxochlorochromate, Peligot's salt, Péligot's salt

Identifiers
CAS Number	16037-50-6
3D model (JSmol)	Interactive image; Interactive image
ChemSpider	141577; 19989111
ECHA InfoCard	100.036.506
EC Number	240-174-7
PubChem CID	23689123
- InChI: InChI=1S/ClH.Cr.K.3O/h1H;;;;;/q;;+1;;;/p-1 Key: PEBPTQFCMJWPGZ-UHFFFAOYSA-M
- SMILES: O=[Cr](=O)=O.[Cl-].[K+]; O=[Cr-](=O)(=O)Cl.[K+]

Properties
Chemical formula	KCrO_{3}Cl
Molar mass	174,5472 g/mol
Appearance	orange solid
Density	2.5228 g/cm^{3}
Solubility in water	Soluble

Hazards
- Occupational safety and health (OHS/OSH)
Main hazards	Highly toxic, corrosive, carcinogenic
- GHS labelling
Pictograms	(GHS03: Oxidizing) (GHS07: Exclamation mark) (GHS08: Health hazard) (GHS09: Environmental hazard)
Signal word	Danger
Hazard statements	H272, H315, H317, H319, H335, H350, H410
Precautionary statements	P203, P210, P220, P261, P264, P264+P265, P271, P272, P273, P280, P302+P352, P304+P340, P305+P351+P338, P318, P319, P321, P333+P317, P337+P317, P362+P364, P370+P378, P391, P403+P233, P405, P501
- Except where otherwise noted, data are given for materials in their standard state (at 25 °C [77 °F], 100 kPa). Infobox references

Potassium chlorochromate is an inorganic compound with the formula KCrO_{3}Cl. It is the potassium salt of chlorochromate, [CrO_{3}Cl]^{−}. It is a water-soluble orange compound is used occasionally for oxidation of organic compounds. It is sometimes called Péligot's salt, in recognition of its discoverer Eugène-Melchior Péligot.

== Structure and synthesis ==
Potassium chlorochromate was originally prepared by treating potassium dichromate with hydrochloric acid. An improved route involves the reaction of chromyl chloride and potassium chromate:

K_{2}CrO_{4} + CrO_{2}Cl_{2} → 2KCrO_{3}Cl

The salt consists of the tetrahedral chlorochromate anion. The average Cr=O bond length is 159 pm, and the Cr-Cl distance is 219 pm.

== Reactions ==
Although air-stable, its aqueous solutions undergo hydrolysis in the presence of strong acids. With concentrated hydrochloric acid, it converts to chromyl chloride, which in turn reacts with water to form chromic acid and additional hydrochloric acid. When treated with 18-crown-6, it forms the lipophilic salt [K(18-crown-6)]CrO_{3}Cl.

Peligot's salt can oxidize benzyl alcohol, a reaction which can be catalyzed by acid. A related salt, pyridinium chlorochromate, is more commonly used for this reaction.

== Safety ==
Potassium chlorochromate is toxic upon ingestion, and may cause irritation, chemical burns, and even ulceration on contact with the skin or eyes. . Like other hexavalent chromium compounds, it is also carcinogenic and mutagenic.
