= 2,2'-Bipyrimidine =

2,2′-Bipyrimidine
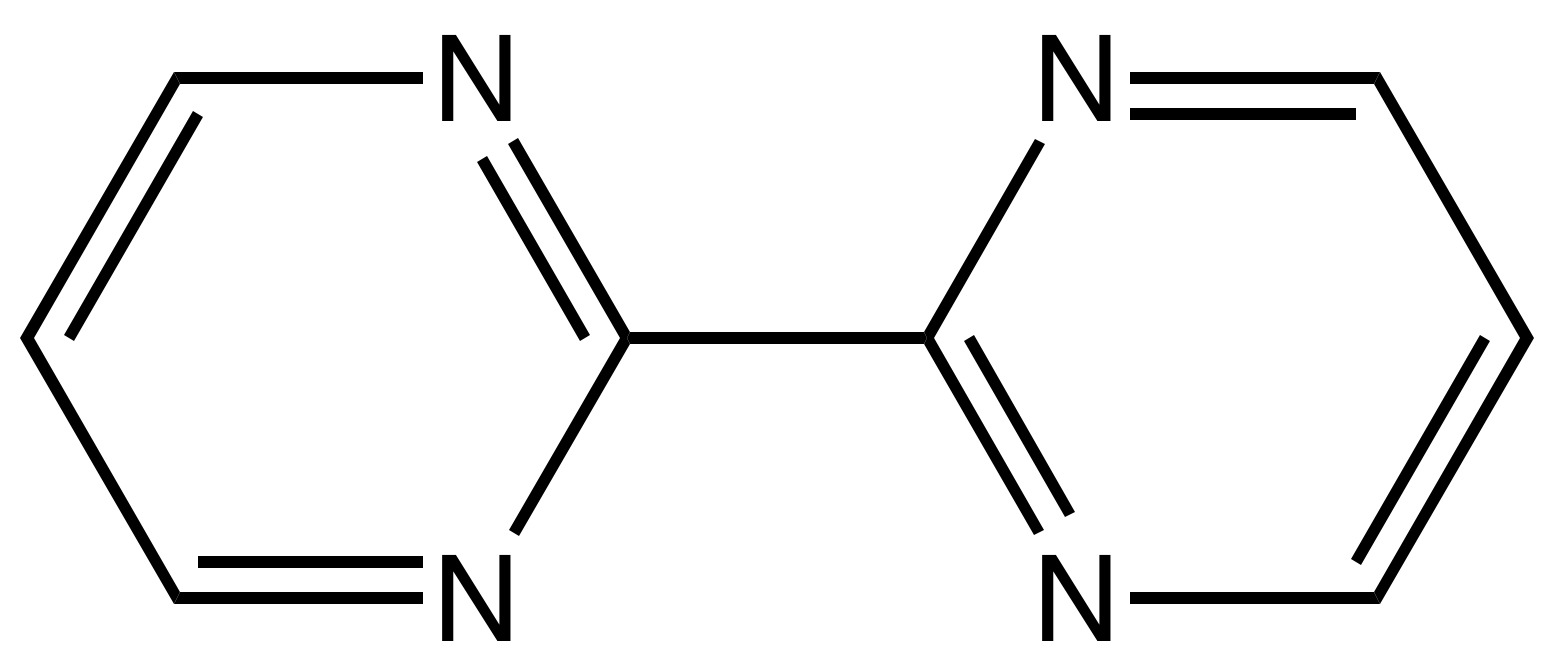

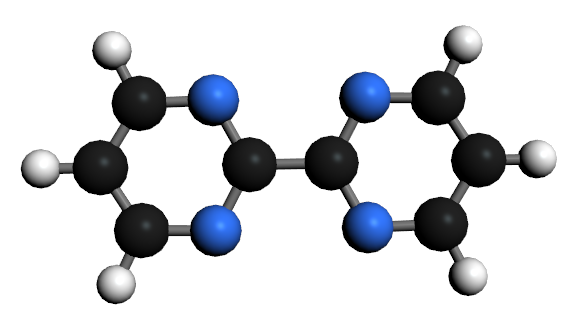

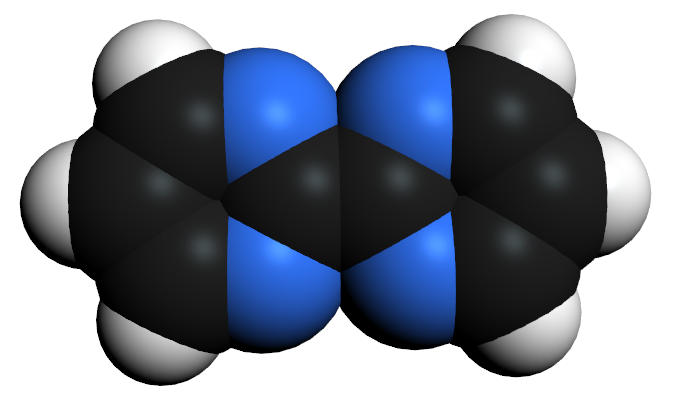

Names
- Preferred IUPAC name 2,2′-Bipyrimidine
- Other names 2,2′-Dipyrimidine, bipyrimidyl

Identifiers
CAS Number	34671-83-5
3D model (JSmol)	Interactive image
ChemSpider	110040
ECHA InfoCard	100.047.383
EC Number	252-137-2
PubChem CID	123444
UNII	Y67VU82SCE
CompTox Dashboard (EPA)	DTXSID50188226
- InChI: InChI=1S/C8H6N4/c1-3-9-7(10-4-1)8-11-5-2-6-12-8/h1-6H Key: HKOAFLAGUQUJQG-UHFFFAOYSA-N
- SMILES: C1=CN=C(N=C1)C2=NC=CC=N2

Properties
Chemical formula	C_{8}H_{6}N_{4}
Molar mass	158.164 g·mol^{−1}
Appearance	white solid
Melting point	113–115 °C (235–239 °F; 386–388 K)

Hazards
- GHS labelling
Pictograms	(GHS07: Exclamation mark)
Signal word	Warning
Hazard statements	H315, H319, H335
Precautionary statements	P261, P264, P271, P280, P302+P352, P304+P340, P305+P351+P338, P312, P321, P332+P313, P337+P313, P362, P403+P233, P405, P501
- Except where otherwise noted, data are given for materials in their standard state (at 25 °C [77 °F], 100 kPa). Infobox references

2,2′-Bipyrimidine is an organic compound with the formula (C_{4}H_{3}N_{2})_{2}. It is a derivative of the heterocycle pyrimidine. It is a white solid. The compound is used as a bridging ligand in coordination chemistry.

2,2′-Bipyrimidines can be prepared by Ullmann coupling of 2-iodopyrimidines.
