= Grubbs catalyst =

Grubbs catalysts are a series of transition metal carbene complexes used as catalysts for olefin metathesis. They are named after Robert H. Grubbs, the chemist who supervised their synthesis. Several generations of the catalyst have also been developed. Grubbs catalysts tolerate many functional groups in the alkene substrates, are air-tolerant, and are compatible with a wide range of solvents. For these reasons, Grubbs catalysts have become popular in synthetic organic chemistry.

Grubbs, together with Richard R. Schrock and Yves Chauvin, won the 2005 Nobel Prize in Chemistry in recognition of their contributions to the development of olefin metathesis.

== First-generation Grubbs catalyst ==
First-generation Grubbs catalyst

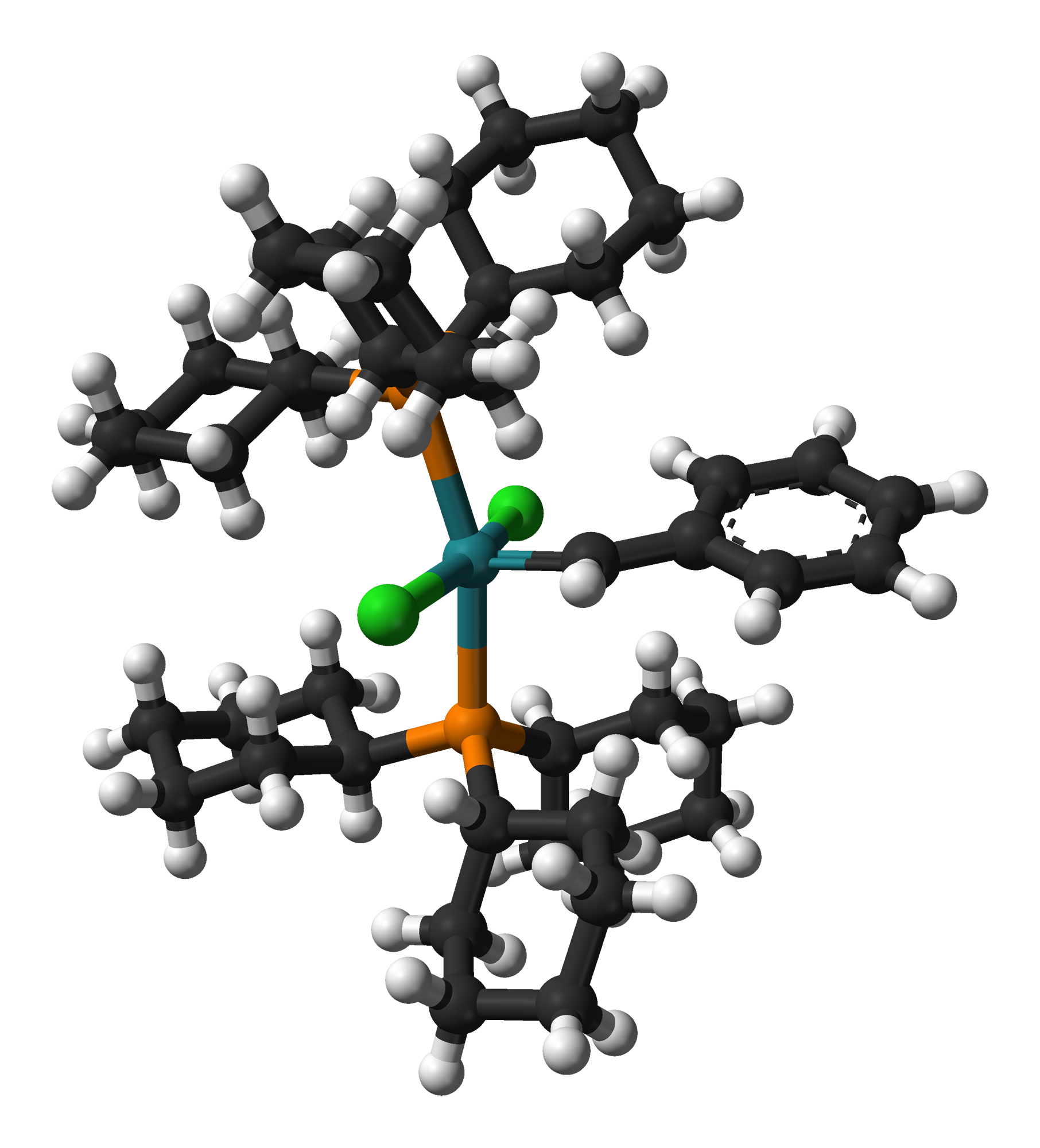

Names
- IUPAC name Benzylidene-bis(tricyclohexylphosphino)-dichlororuthenium

Identifiers
CAS Number	172222-30-9
3D model (JSmol)	Interactive image
ChemSpider	25071160
PubChem CID	86306055
UNII	J7P585D3ZC
- InChI: InChI=1S/C43H72P2.2ClH.Ru/c1-8-22-36(23-9-1)43(44(37-24-10-2-11-25-37,38-26-12-3-13-27-38)39-28-14-4-15-29-39)45(40-30-16-5-17-31-40,41-32-18-6-19-33-41)42-34-20-7-21-35-42;;;/h1,8-9,22-23,37-43H,2-7,10-21,24-35H2;2*1H;/q+2;;;+2/p-2 Key: NDDFAYQFCZRYDT-UHFFFAOYSA-L
- SMILES: Cl[Ru-2](Cl)([P+](C1CCCCC1)(C1CCCCC1)C1CCCCC1)([P+](C1CCCCC1)(C1CCCCC1)C1CCCCC1)=Cc1ccccc1

Properties
Chemical formula	C_{43}H_{72}Cl_{2}P_{2}Ru
Molar mass	822.97 g·mol^{−1}
Appearance	Purple solid
Melting point	153 °C (307 °F; 426 K) (decomposition)
- Except where otherwise noted, data are given for materials in their standard state (at 25 °C [77 °F], 100 kPa). verify (what is ?) Infobox references

In the 1960s, ruthenium trichloride was found to catalyze olefin metathesis. Processes were commercialized based on these discoveries. Ill-defined but highly active homogeneous catalysts based on this remain in industrial use.

The first well-defined ruthenium catalyst was reported in 1992. It was prepared from RuCl_{2}(PPh_{3})_{4} and diphenylcyclopropene.

First Grubbs-type catalyst

This initial ruthenium catalyst was followed in 1995 by what is now known as the first-generation Grubbs catalyst. It is synthesized from RuCl_{2}(PPh_{3})_{3}, phenyldiazomethane, and tricyclohexylphosphine in a one-pot synthesis.

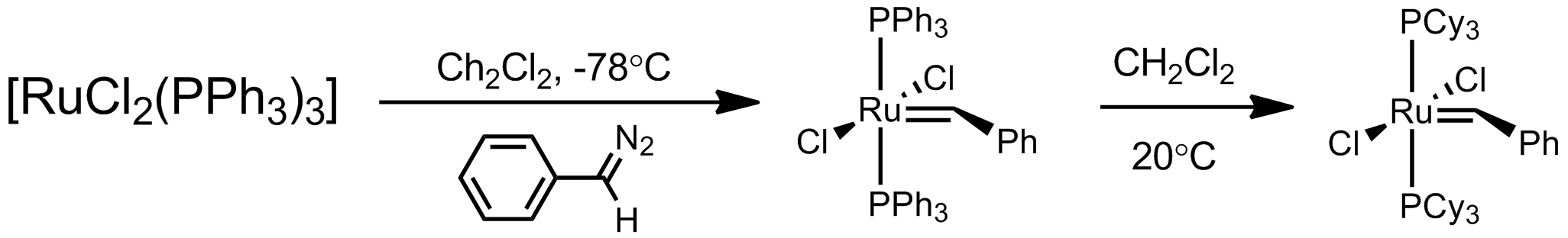
Preparation of the first-generation Grubbs catalyst

== Second-generation Grubbs catalyst ==
Second-generation Grubbs catalyst

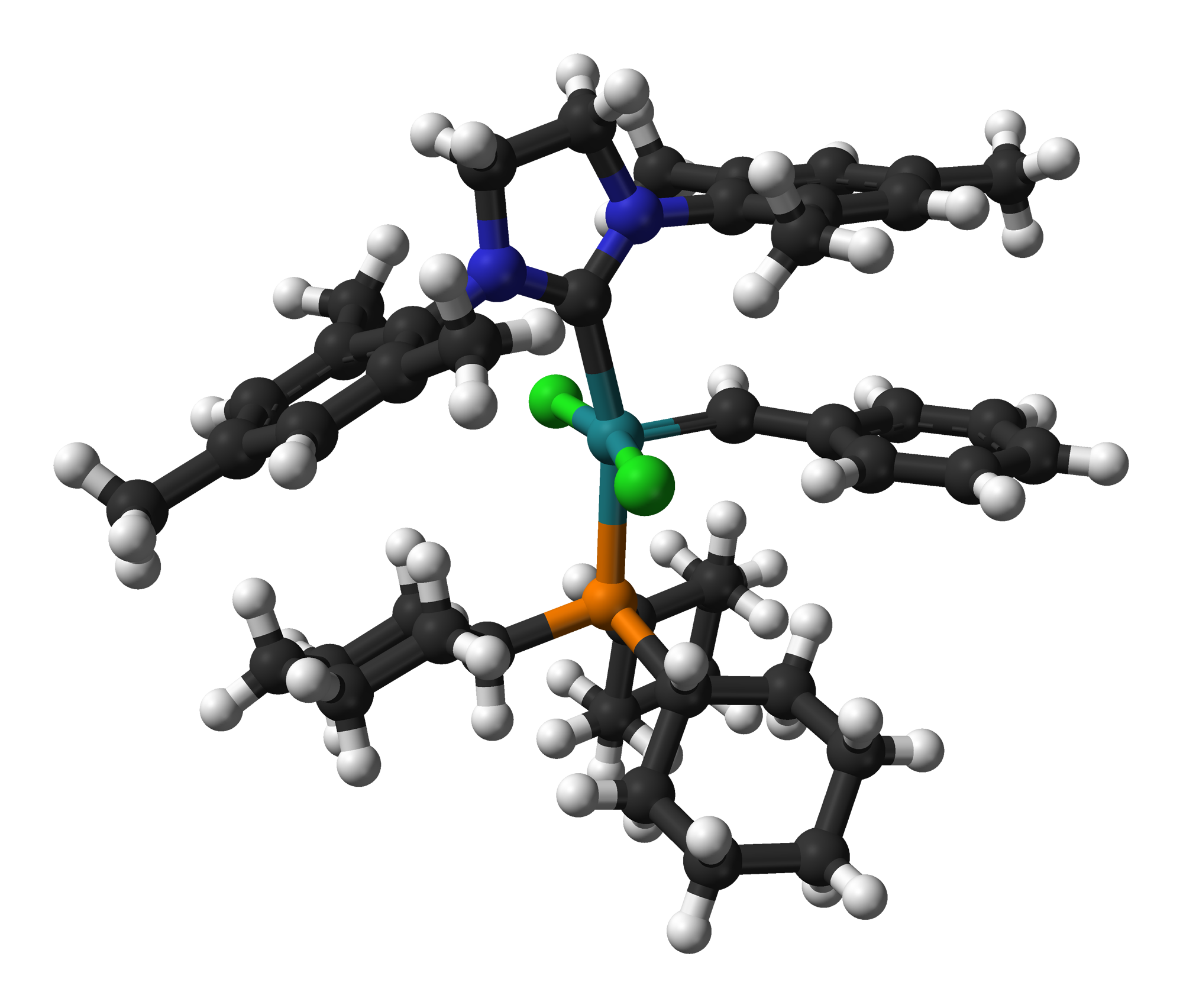

Names
- IUPAC name [1,3-bis-(2,4,6-trimethylphenyl)-2-imidazolidinylidene]dichloro(phenylmethylene)(tricyclohexylphosphino)ruthenium

Identifiers
CAS Number	246047-72-3
3D model (JSmol)	Interactive image
ChemSpider	9322369
PubChem CID	11147261
- InChI: InChI=1S/C21H26N2.C18H33P.C7H6.2ClH.Ru/c1-14-9-16(3)20(17(4)10-14)22-7-8-23(13-22)21-18(5)11-15(2)12-19(21)6;1-4-10-16(11-5-1)19(17-12-6-2-7-13-17)18-14-8-3-9-15-18;1-7-5-3-2-4-6-7;;;/h9-12H,7-8H2,1-6H3;16-18H,1-15H2;1-6H;2*1H;/q;;;;;+2/p-2 Key: FCDPQMAOJARMTG-UHFFFAOYSA-L
- SMILES: Cl[Ru-2](Cl)([c+]0n(-c1c(C)cc(C)cc1C)CCn0-c1c(C)cc(C)cc1C)([P+](C1CCCCC1)(C1CCCCC1)C1CCCCC1)=Cc1ccccc1

Properties
Chemical formula	C_{46}H_{65}Cl_{2}N_{2}PRu
Molar mass	848.98 g·mol^{−1}
Appearance	Pinkish brown solid
Melting point	143.5 to 148.5 °C (290.3 to 299.3 °F; 416.6 to 421.6 K)

Hazards
- GHS labelling
Pictograms	(GHS02: Flammable)
Signal word	Warning
Hazard statements	H228
Precautionary statements	P210, P240, P241, P280, P378
- Except where otherwise noted, data are given for materials in their standard state (at 25 °C [77 °F], 100 kPa). Infobox references

The second-generation catalyst has the same uses in organic synthesis as the first generation catalyst, but generally with higher activity.

The second-generation catalyst based on a saturated N-heterocyclic carbene (1,3-bis(2,4,6-trimethylphenyl)dihydroimidazole) was reported in 1999:

Synthesis of the second–generation Grubbs catalyst

In both the saturated and unsaturated cases a phosphine ligand is replaced with an N-heterocyclic carbene (NHC), which is characteristic of all second-generation-type catalysts.

== Hoveyda–Grubbs catalysts ==
First-generation Hoveyda–Grubbs catalyst

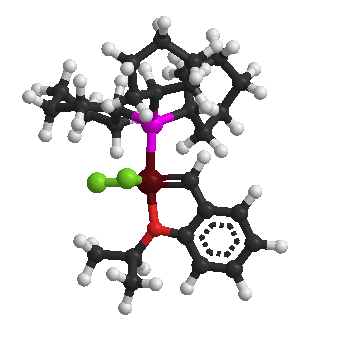

Names
- IUPAC name Dichloro(o-isopropoxyphenylmethylene)(tricyclohexylphosphine)ruthenium(II)

Identifiers
CAS Number	203714-71-0
3D model (JSmol)	Interactive image
ChemSpider	9116251
PubChem CID	24880901
- InChI: InChI=1S/C18H33P.C10H12O.2ClH.Ru/c1-4-10-16(11-5-1)19(17-12-6-2-7-13-17)18-14-8-3-9-15-18;1-8(2)11-10-7-5-4-6-9(10)3;;;/h16-18H,1-15H2;3-8H,1-2H3;2*1H;/q;;;;+2/p-2 Key: KMKCJXPECJFQPQ-UHFFFAOYSA-L
- SMILES: Cl[Ru-2]2(Cl)([P+](C1CCCCC1)(C1CCCCC1)C1CCCCC1)=Cc1ccccc1[O+]2C(C)C

Properties
Chemical formula	C_{28}H_{45}Cl_{2}OPRu
Molar mass	600.61 g·mol^{−1}
Appearance	Brown solid
Melting point	195 to 197 °C (383 to 387 °F; 468 to 470 K)

Hazards
- GHS labelling
Pictograms	(GHS02: Flammable)
Signal word	Warning
Hazard statements	H228
Precautionary statements	P210, P240, P241, P280, P378
- Except where otherwise noted, data are given for materials in their standard state (at 25 °C [77 °F], 100 kPa). Infobox references

Second-generation Hoveyda–Grubbs catalyst
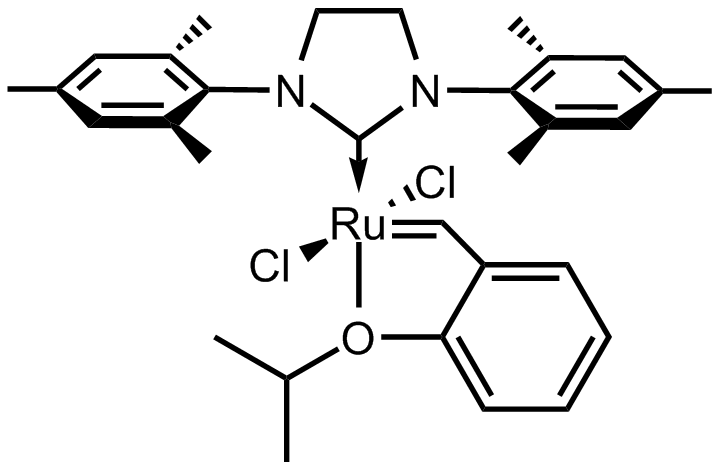

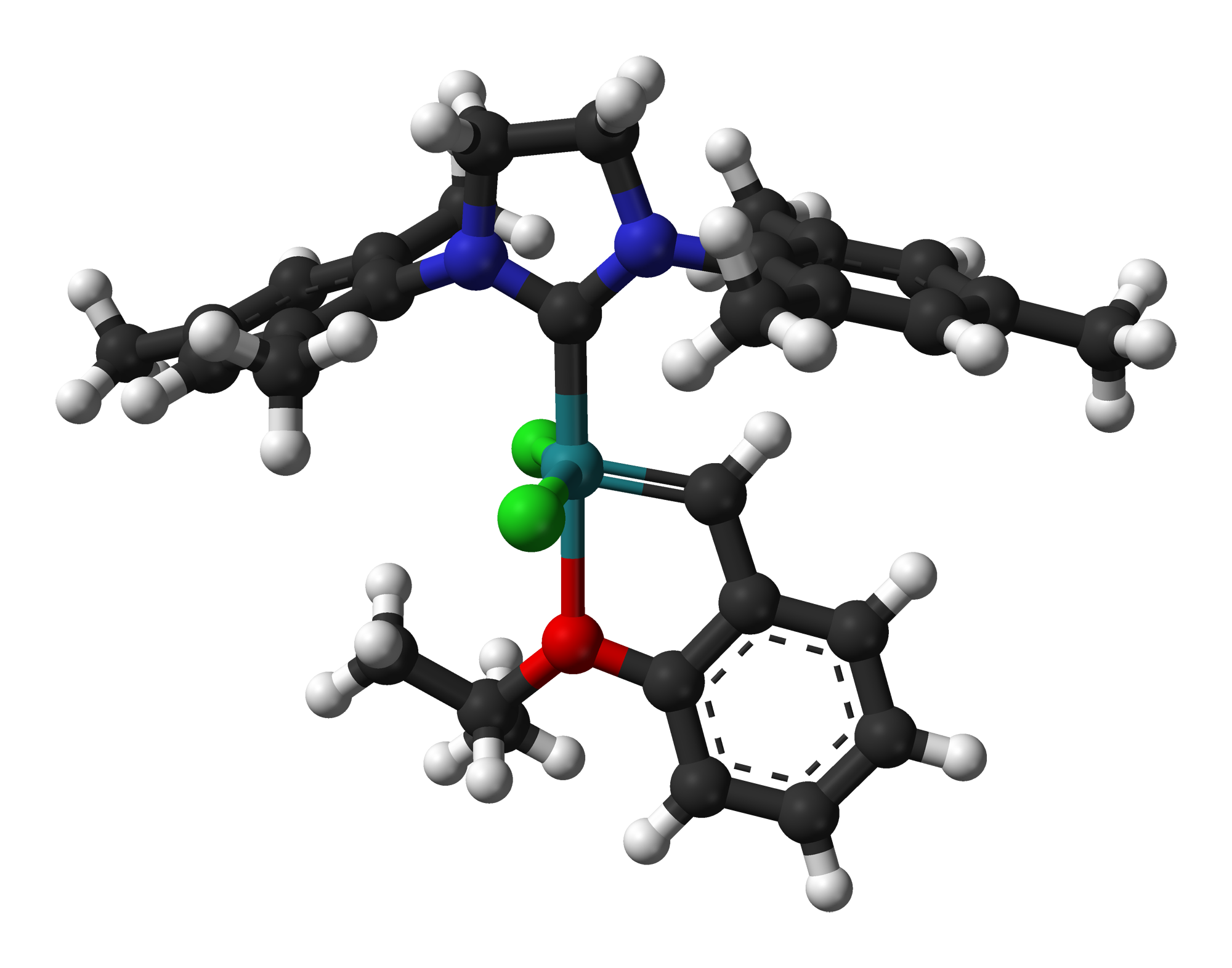

Names
- IUPAC name [1,3-Bis-(2,4,6-trimethylphenyl)-2-imidazolidinylidene]dichloro(o-isopropoxyphenylmethylene)ruthenium

Identifiers
CAS Number	301224-40-8
3D model (JSmol)	Interactive image
ChemSpider	9938229
EC Number	608-446-3
PubChem CID	11763533
- InChI: InChI=1S/C21H26N2.C10H12O.2ClH.Ru/c1-14-9-16(3)20(17(4)10-14)22-7-8-23(13-22)21-18(5)11-15(2)12-19(21)6;1-8(2)11-10-7-5-4-6-9(10)3;;;/h9-12H,7-8H2,1-6H3;3-8H,1-2H3;2*1H;/q;;;;+2/p-2 Key: ZRPFJAPZDXQHSM-UHFFFAOYSA-L
- SMILES: Cl[Ru-2]2(Cl)([c+]0n(-c1c(C)cc(C)cc1C)CCn0-c1c(C)cc(C)cc1C)=Cc1ccccc1[O+]2C(C)C

Properties
Chemical formula	C_{31}H_{38}Cl_{2}N_{2}ORu
Molar mass	626.63 g·mol^{−1}
Appearance	Green solid
Melting point	216 to 220 °C (421 to 428 °F; 489 to 493 K)
- Except where otherwise noted, data are given for materials in their standard state (at 25 °C [77 °F], 100 kPa). Infobox references

In the Hoveyda–Grubbs catalysts, the benzylidene ligands have a chelating ortho-isopropoxy group attached to the benzene rings. The ortho-isopropoxybenzylidene moiety is sometimes referred to as a Hoveyda chelate. The chelating oxygen atom replaces a phosphine ligand, which in the case of the 2nd generation catalyst, gives a completely phosphine-free structure.

The 1st generation Hoveyda–Grubbs catalyst was reported in 1999. In the following year, the second-generation of the catalyst was described in nearly simultaneous publications by two independent lab groups.

The Hoveyda–Grubbs catalysts, while more expensive and slower to initiate than the Grubbs catalyst from which they are derived, are popular because of their improved stability. By changing the steric and electronic properties of the chelate, the initiation rate of the catalyst can be modulated, such as in the Zhan catalysts.

Hoveyda–Grubbs catalysts are easily formed from the corresponding Grubbs catalyst by the addition of the chelating ligand and the use of a phosphine scavenger like copper(I) chloride:

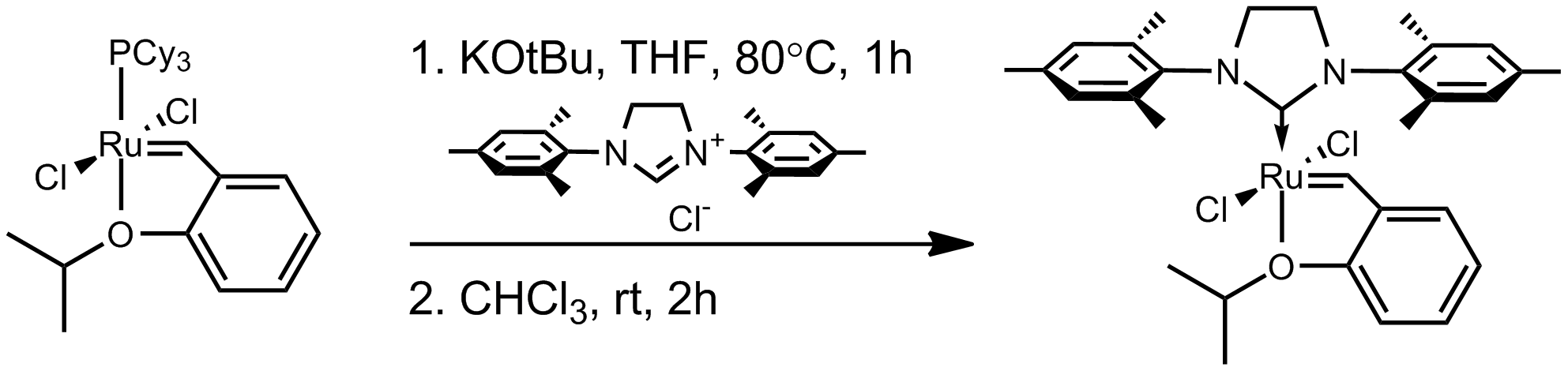
Preparation of the first-generation Hoveyda–Grubbs catalyst from the first-generation Grubbs catalyst

The second-generation Hoveyda–Grubbs catalysts can also be prepared from the 1st generation Hoveyda–Grubbs catalyst by the addition of the NHC:

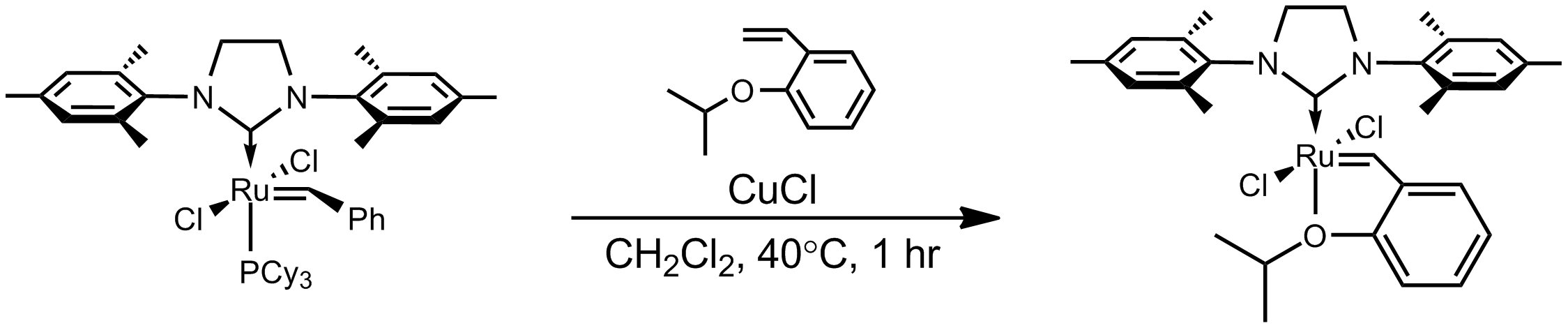
Preparation of the second-generation Hoveyda–Grubbs catalyst from the second–generation Grubbs catalyst

In 2006, a water-soluble Grubbs catalyst was prepared by attaching a polyethylene glycol chain to the imidazolidine group. This catalyst is used in the ring-closing metathesis reaction in water of a diene carrying an ammonium salt group making it water-soluble as well.

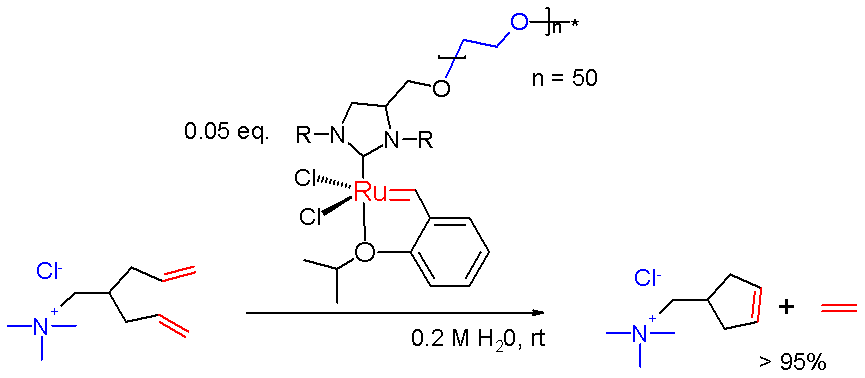
Ring closing metathesis reaction in water

== Third-generation Grubbs catalyst (fast-initiating catalysts) ==
The rate of the Grubbs catalyst can be altered by replacing the phosphine ligand with more labile pyridine ligands. By using 3-bromopyridine the initiation rate is increased more than a million times. Both pyridine and 3-bromopyridine are commonly used, with the bromo- version being 4.8 times more labile resulting in even faster rates. The catalyst is traditionally isolated as a two pyridine complex, however one pyridine is lost upon dissolving and reversibly inhibits the ruthenium center throughout any chemical reaction.

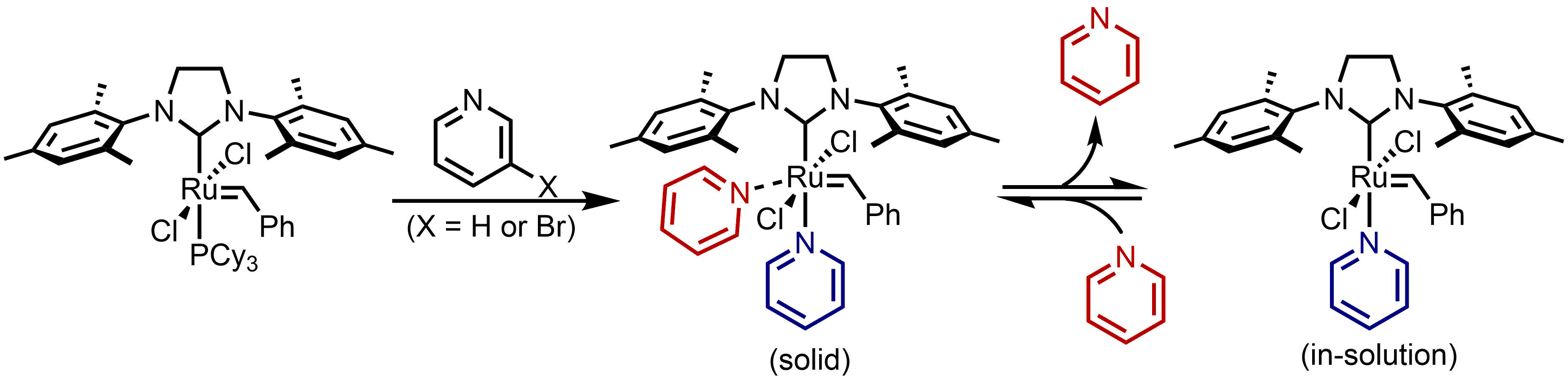

The principal application of the fast-initiating catalysts is as initiators for ring opening metathesis polymerisation (ROMP). Because of their usefulness in ROMP these catalysts are sometimes referred to as the 3rd generation Grubbs catalysts. The high ratio of the rate of initiation to the rate of propagation makes these catalysts useful in living polymerization, yielding polymers with low polydispersity.

== Applications ==
Grubbs catalysts are of interest for olefin metathesis. They are mainly applied to fine chemical synthesis. Large-scale commercial applications of olefin metathesis almost always employ heterogeneous catalysts or ill-defined systems based on ruthenium trichloride.
