= Cyclooctadiene =

Cycloocta-1,5-diene

A cyclooctadiene (often abbreviated COD) is any of several cyclic diene with the formula C_{8}H_{12}. Focusing only on cis derivatives, four isomers are possible: 1,2-, which is an allene, 1,3-, 1,4-, and 1,5-. Commonly encountered isomers are the conjugated isomer cycloocta-1,3-diene and cycloocta-1,5-diene, which is used as a ligand for transition metals. These dienes are colorless volatile liquids.

1,5-Cyclooctadiene is a feedstock for synthesis of various heteroadamantanes.
