= Luche reduction =

Primary alcohol

Named after	Jean-Louis Luche
Reaction type	Organic redox reaction

Identifiers
Organic Chemistry Portal	luche-reduction
RSC ontology ID	RXNO:0000286

Luche reduction is the selective organic reduction of α,β-unsaturated ketones to allylic alcohols. The active reductant is described as "cerium borohydride", which is generated in situ from NaBH_{4} and CeCl_{3}(H_{2}O)_{7}.

The Luche reduction can be conducted chemoselectively toward ketone in the presence of aldehydes or towards α,β-unsaturated ketones in the presence of a non-conjugated ketone.

An enone forms an allylic alcohol in a 1,2-addition, and the competing conjugate 1,4-addition is suppressed.

The selectivity can be explained in terms of the HSAB theory: carbonyl groups require hard nucleophiles for 1,2-addition. The hardness of the borohydride is increased by replacing hydride groups with alkoxide groups, a reaction catalyzed by the cerium salt by increasing the electrophilicity of the carbonyl group. This is selective for ketones because they are more Lewis basic.

In one application, a ketone is selectively reduced in the presence of an aldehyde. Actually, in the presence of methanol as solvent, the aldehyde forms a methoxy acetal that is inactive in the reducing conditions.
