= Dicobalt hexacarbonyl acetylene complex =

Structure of dicobalt hexacarbonyl adduct of 2-butyne.

Dicobalt hexacarbonyl acetylene complexes are a family of In organocobalt compounds with the formula Co_{2}(C_{2}R_{2})(CO)_{6}. A large variety of R groups are tolerated. They are red compounds that are soluble in organic solvents. They arise from the reaction of alkynes and dicobalt octacarbonyl:

Co_{2}(CO)_{8} + R_{2}C_{2} → (R_{2}C_{2})Co_{2}(CO)_{6} + 2 CO

According to X-ray crystallography, the two Co atoms and two alkyne carbons form the vertices of a distorted tetrahedron. The C-C distance for the bridging alkyne ligand is 1.33 Å, and the Co-Co distance is 2.47 Å. The (R_{2}C_{2})Co_{2}(CO)_{6} core has C_{2v} symmetry. The structure is related to that of methylidynetricobaltnonacarbonyl and tetracobalt dodecacarbonyl, which are also tetrahedranes.

These complexes are intermediates in the Pauson-Khand reaction.
