= Pauson–Khand reaction =

Chemical reaction

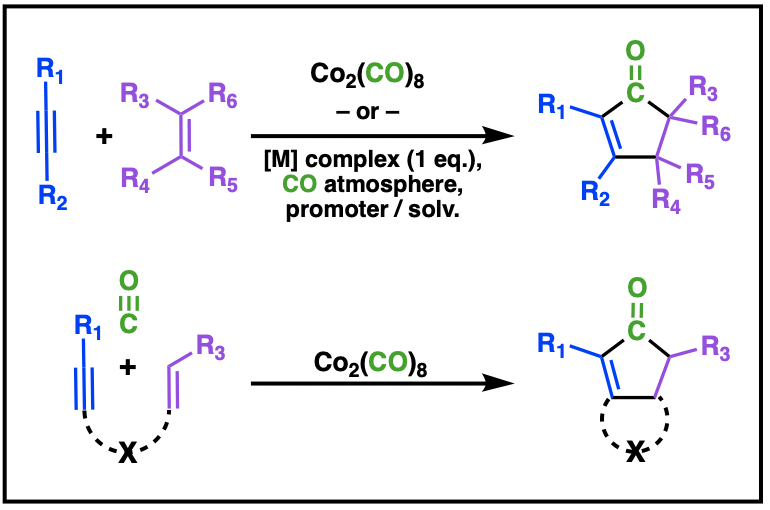

The Pauson–Khand (PK) reaction is a chemical reaction, described as a [2+2+1] cycloaddition. In it, an alkyne, an alkene, and carbon monoxide combine into a α,β-cyclopentenone in the presence of a metal-carbonyl catalyst Ihsan Ullah Khand (1935–1980) discovered the reaction around 1970, while working as a postdoctoral associate with Peter Ludwig Pauson (1925–2013) at the University of Strathclyde in Glasgow. Pauson and Khand's initial findings were intermolecular in nature, but the reaction has poor selectivity. Some modern applications instead apply the reaction for intramolecular ends.

The traditional reaction requires a stoichiometric amounts of dicobalt octacarbonyl, stabilized by a carbon monoxide atmosphere. Catalytic metal quantities, enhanced reactivity and yield, or stereoinduction are all possible with the right chiral auxiliaries, choice of transition metal (Ti, Mo, W, Fe, Co, Ni, Ru, Rh, Ir and Pd), and additives.

== Mechanism ==
While the mechanism has not yet been fully elucidated, Magnus' 1985 explanation is widely accepted for both mono- and dinuclear catalysts, and was corroborated by computational studies published by Nakamura and Yamanaka in 2001. The reaction starts with dicobalt hexacarbonyl acetylene complex. Binding of an alkene gives a metallacyclopentene complex. CO then migratorily inserts into an M-C bond. Reductive elimination delivers the cyclopentenone. Typically, the dissociation of carbon monoxide from the organometallic complex is rate limiting.

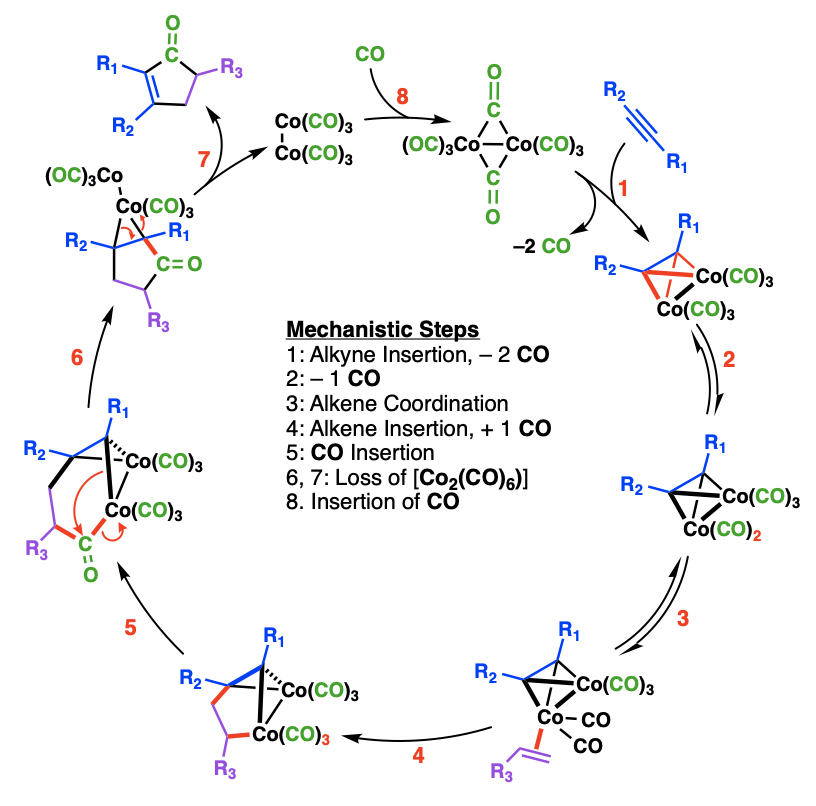
1: Alkyne coordination, insertion and ligand dissociation to form an 18-electron complex; 2: Ligand dissociation to form a 16-electron complex; 3: Alkene coordination to form an 18-electron complex; 4: Alkene insertion and ligand association (synperiplanar, still 18 electrons); 5: CO migratory insertion; 6, 7: Reductive elimination of metal (loss of [Co_{2}(CO)_{6}]); 8: CO association, to regenerate the active organometallic complex.

== Selectivity ==
The reaction works with both terminal and internal alkynes, although internal alkynes tend to give lower yields. The order of reactivity for the alkene is

(strained cyclic) > (terminal) > (disubstituted) > (trisubstituted).

Tetrasubstituted alkenes and alkenes with strongly electron-withdrawing groups are unsuitable.

With unsymmetrical alkenes or alkynes, the reaction is rarely regioselective, although some patterns can be observed.

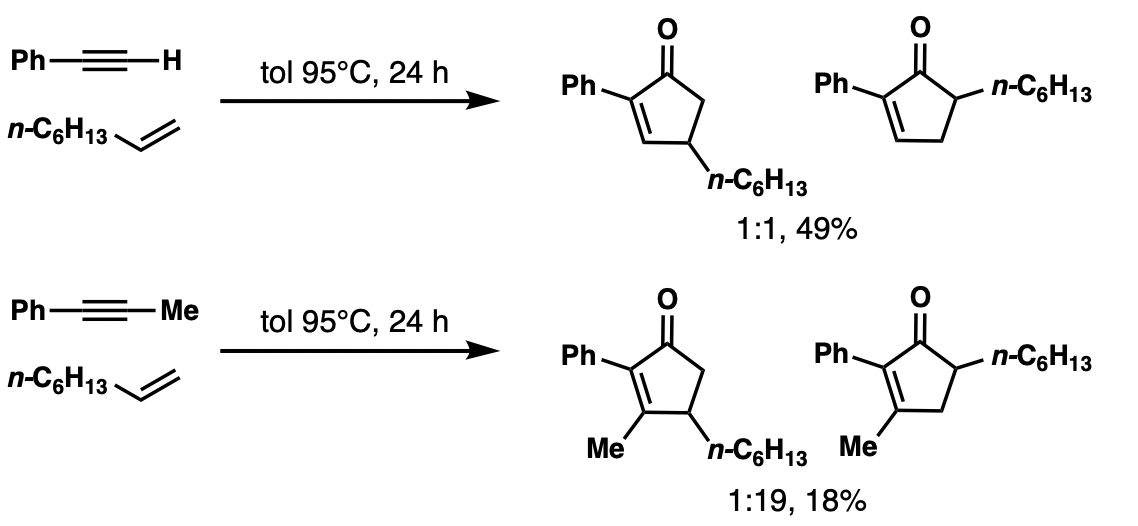
The PK reaction has poor regioselectivity with monosubstituted alkenes. Phenylacetylene and 1-octene produce at least 4 isomeric products. ("tol" = toluene)

For mono-substituted alkenes, alkyne substituents typically direct: larger groups prefer the C^{2} position, and electron-withdrawing groups prefer the C^{3} position.

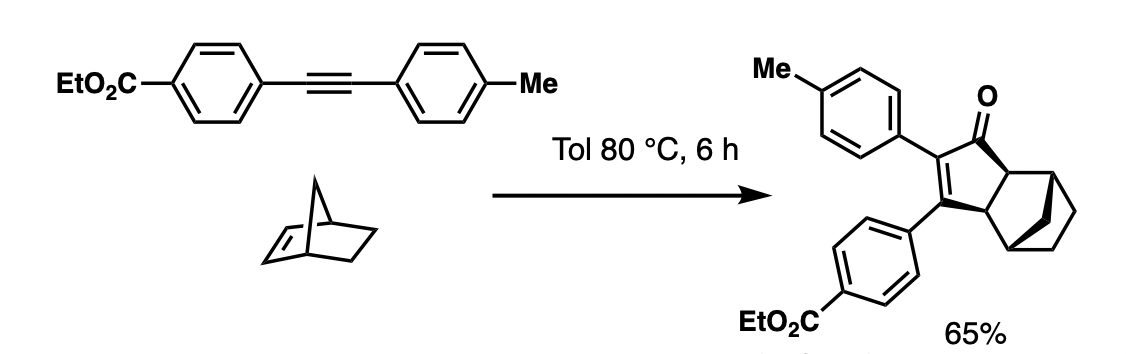
An electron-withdrawing group (ethyl benzoatyl) prefers the C^{3} position. ("Tol" = toluene)

But the alkene itself struggles to discriminate between the C^{4} and C^{5} position, unless the C^{2} position is sterically congested or the alkene has a chelating heteroatom.

The reaction's poor selectivity is ameliorated in intramolecular reactions. For this reason, the intramolecular Pauson-Khand is common in total synthesis, particularly the formation of 5,5- and 6,5-membered fused bicycles.

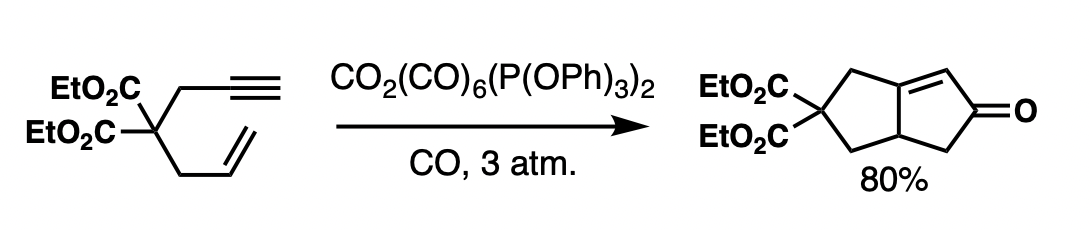

Generally, the reaction is highly syn-selective about the bridgehead hydrogen and substituents on the cyclopentane.

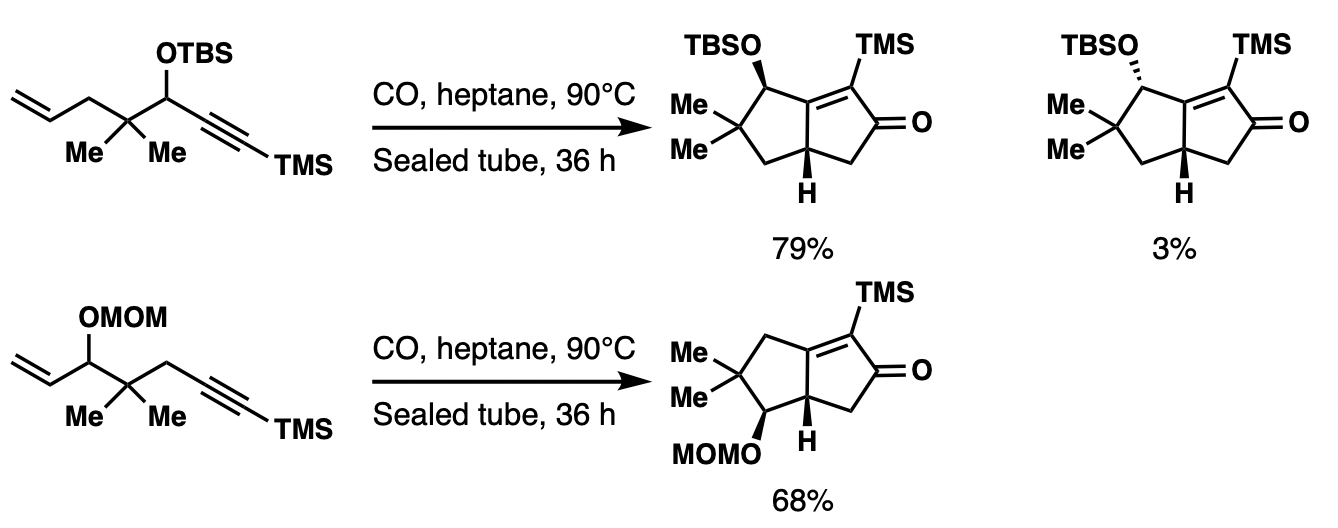

Appropriate chiral ligands or auxiliaries can make the reaction enantioselective (see § Amine N-oxides). BINAP is commonly employed.

== Additives ==
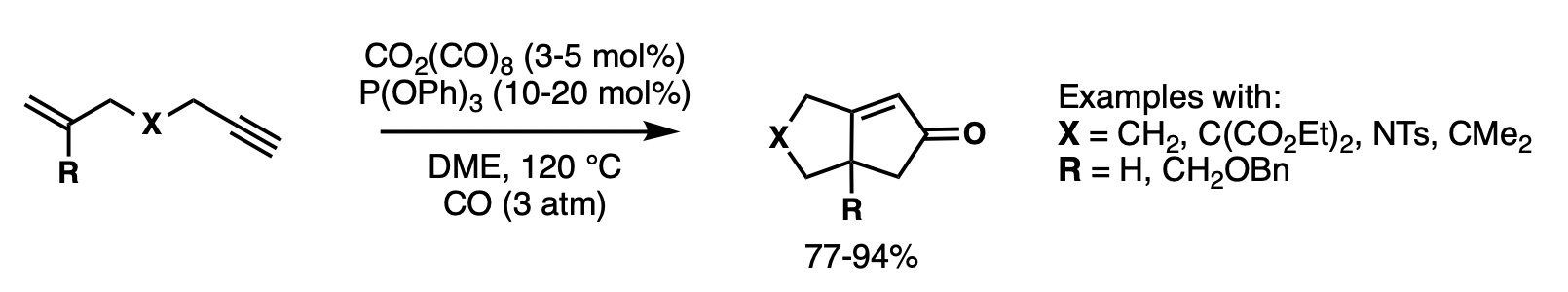

Typical Pauson-Khand conditions are elevated temperatures and pressures in aromatic hydrocarbon (benzene, toluene) or ethereal (tetrahydrofuran, 1,2-dichloroethane) solvents. These harsh conditions may be attenuated with the addition of various additives.

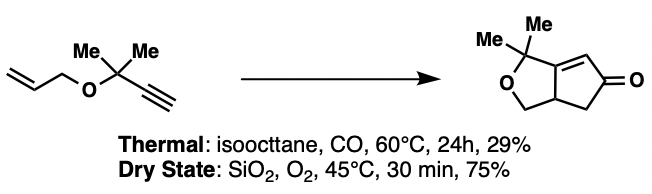
Adding silica improved this reaction rate by a factor of ≈50.

=== Absorbent surfaces ===
Adsorbing the metallic complex onto silica or alumina can enhance the rate of decarbonylative ligand exchange as exhibited in the image below. This is because the donor posits itself on a solid surface (i.e. silica). Additionally using a solid support restricts conformational movement (rotamer effect).

=== Lewis bases ===
Traditional catalytic aids such as phosphine ligands make the cobalt complex too stable, but bulky phosphite ligands are operable.

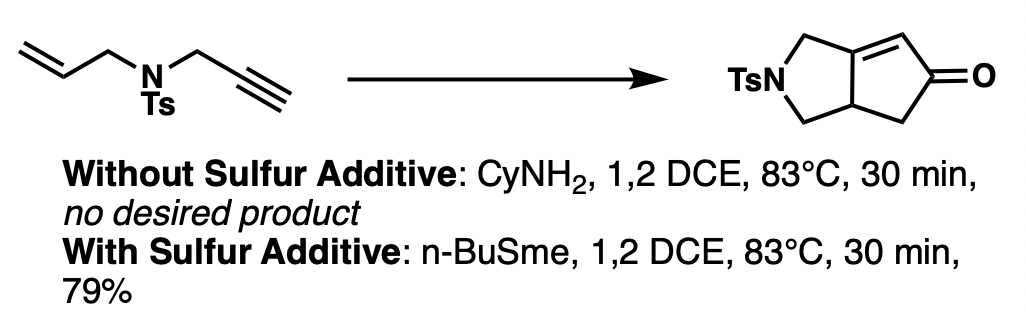

Lewis basic additives, such as n-BuSMe, are also believed to accelerate the decarbonylative ligand exchange process. However, an alternative view holds that the additives make olefin insertion irreversible instead. Sulfur compounds are typically hard to handle and smelly, but n-dodecyl methyl sulfide and tetramethylthiourea do not suffer from those problems and can improve reaction performance.

=== Amine N-oxides ===
The two most common amine N-oxides are N-methylmorpholine N-oxide (NMO) and trimethylamine N-oxide (TMANO). It is believed that these additives remove carbon monoxide ligands via nucleophilic attack of the N-oxide onto the CO carbonyl, oxidizing the CO into CO_{2}, and generating an unsaturated organometallic complex. This renders the first step of the mechanism irreversible, and allows for more mild conditions. Hydrates of the aforementioned amine N-oxides have similar effect.

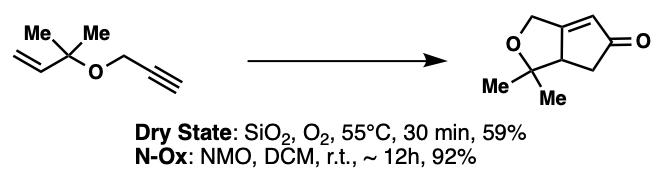
NMO = N‑methylmorpholine N‑oxide, DCM = dichloromethane

N-oxide additives can also improve enantio- and diastereoselectivity, although the mechanism thereby is not clear.

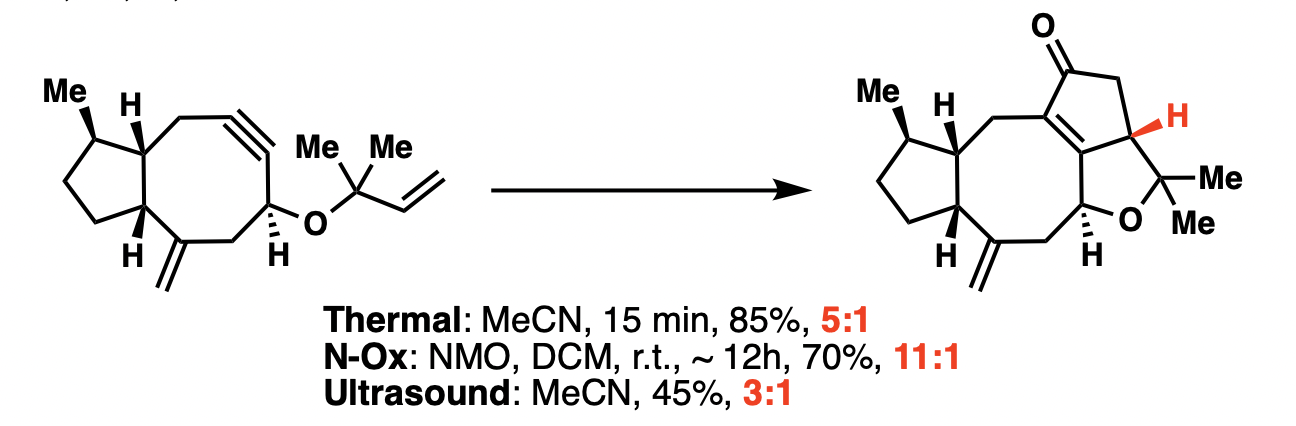
(NMO = N‑methylmorpholine N‑oxide, DCM = dichloromethane) A step in the total synthesis of epoxydictymene: temperature and ultrasound failed to improve the d.r. for the desired diastereomer (the red hydrogen). But the N-oxide additive, while lower yielding, gave a d.r. of 11:1.

== Alternative catalysts ==
(Co)_{4}(CO)_{12} and Co_{3}(CO)_{9}(μ^{3}-CH) also catalyze the PK reaction although Takayama et al detail a reaction catalyzed by dicobalt octacarbonyl.

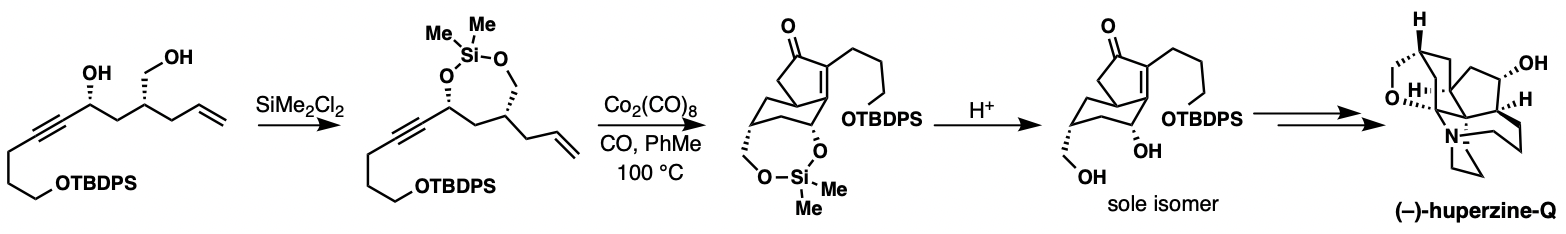
The key step in Takayama et al's asymmetric total synthesis of the Lycopodium alkaloid huperzine-Q: Co_{2}(CO)_{8} catalyzes an enyne cyclization. The siloxane ring ensures that only a single product enantiomer forms.

One stabilization method is to generate the catalyst in situ. Chung reports that Co(acac)_{2} can serve as a precatalyst, activated by sodium borohydride.

=== Other metals ===
catalyst requires a silver triflate co-catalyst to effect the Pauson–Khand reaction:

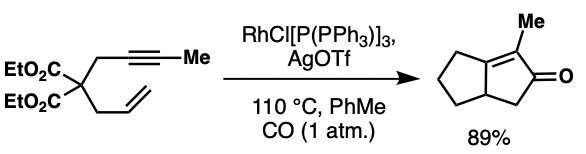
PK reaction with Wilkinson's catalyst

Molybdenum hexacarbonyl is a carbon monoxide donor in PK-type reactions between allenes and alkynes with dimethyl sulfoxide in toluene. Titanium, nickel, and zirconium complexes admit the reaction. Other metals can also be employed in these transformations.

== Substrate tolerance ==
In general allenes, support the Pauson–Khand reaction; regioselectivity is determined by the choice of metal catalyst. Density functional investigations show the variation arises from different transition state metal geometries.

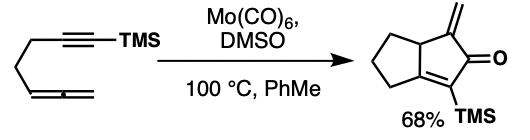
Molybdenum catalyzes a Pauson-Khand reaction at an allene's internal double bond. Rhodium would catalyze a reaction at this substrate's terminal double-bond instead.

Heteroatoms are also acceptable: Mukai et al's total synthesis of physostigmine applied the Pauson–Khand reaction to a carbodiimide.

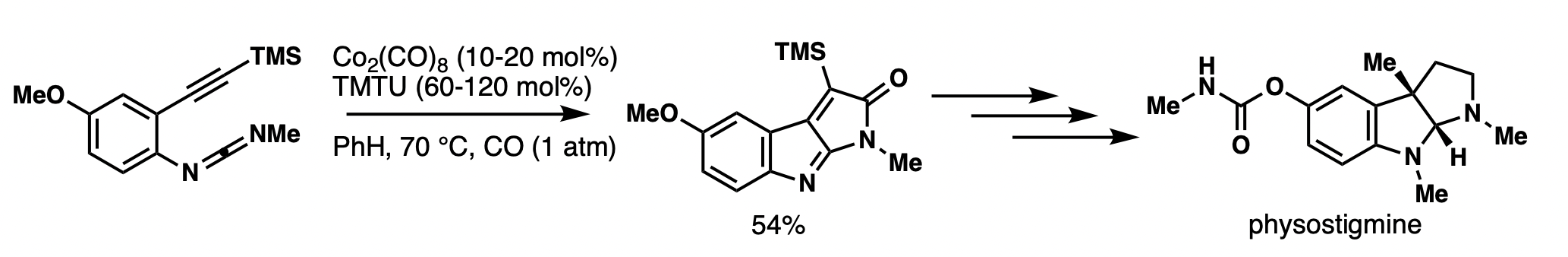

Cyclobutadiene also lends itself to a [2+2+1] cycloaddition, although this reactant is too active to store in bulk. Instead, cyclobutadiene is generated in situ from decomplexation of stable cyclobutadiene iron tricarbonyl with ceric ammonium nitrate (CAN).

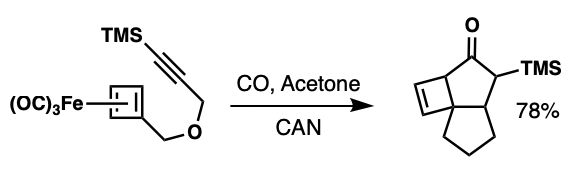
Pauson Khand reaction Seigal 2005

An example of a newer version is the use of the chlorodicarbonylrhodium(I) dimer, [(CO)_{2}RhCl]_{2}, in the synthesis of (+)-phorbol by Phil Baran. In addition to using a rhodium catalyst, this synthesis features an intramolecular cyclization that results in the normal 5-membered α,β-cyclopentenone as well as 7-membered ring.

=== Carbon monoxide generation in situ ===
The cyclopentenone motif can be prepared from aldehydes, carboxylic acids, and formates. These examples typically employ rhodium as the catalyst, as it is commonly used in decarbonylation reactions. The decarbonylation and PK reaction occur in the same reaction vessel.

== See also ==
- Nicholas reaction
