= Sodium tetracarbonylcobaltate =

Identifiers
CAS Number	14878-28-5
3D model (JSmol)	Interactive image
ChemSpider	9238441
ECHA InfoCard	100.225.207
EC Number	696-062-7
PubChem CID	ID: 9238441 ChemSpider ID: 9238441
- InChI: InChI=1S/4CO.Co.Na/c4*1-2;;/q;;;;-1;+1 Key: REACDJLEGGOITP-UHFFFAOYSA-N
- SMILES: [Co-](C#O)(C#O)(C#O)C#O.[Na+]

Properties
Chemical formula	C_{4}CoNaO_{4}
Molar mass	193.963 g·mol^{−1}
Appearance	white solid

Hazards
- GHS labelling
Pictograms	(GHS06: Toxic) (GHS08: Health hazard) (GHS09: Environmental hazard)
Signal word	Danger
Hazard statements	H302, H317, H330, H351, H412
- Except where otherwise noted, data are given for materials in their standard state (at 25 °C [77 °F], 100 kPa). Infobox references

Sodium tetracarbonylcobaltate is the organocobalt compound with the formula NaCo(CO)_{4}. It is a common derivative of the tetracarbonylcobaltate anion, [Co(CO)_{4}]^{-}, although several other alkali metal salts are known. The tetracarbonylcobaltate anion is the conjugate base of cobalt tetracarbonyl hydride, HCo(CO)_{4}. According to X-ray crystallography, the Co(CO)_{4}^{-} center is nearly tetrahedral (isoelectronic with Ni(CO)_{4}).

Conventionally, this compound is prepared by reduction of dicobalt octacarbonyl with sodium amalgam:

Co_{2}(CO)_{8} + 2 Na → 2 NaCo(CO)_{4}

It reacts with mercuric cyanide to give a HgCo_{2} derivative:

Hg(CN)_{2} + 2 NaCo(CO)_{4} → Hg[Co(CO)_{4}]_{2} + 2 NaCN
