= Cobalt tricarbonyl nitrosyl =

Names
- Other names Cobalt nitrosyl tricarbonyl

Identifiers
CAS Number	14096-82-3
3D model (JSmol)	Interactive image
ChemSpider	21241479
ECHA InfoCard	100.034.481
EC Number	237-945-5
PubChem CID	13539873 (charge error)
- InChI: InChI=1S/3CO.Co.NO/c3*1-2;;1-2/q;;;+1;-1 Key: XDBBIZGDISXSEJ-UHFFFAOYSA-N
- SMILES: [C]=O.[C]=O.[C]=O.N(=O)[Co]

Properties
Chemical formula	C_{3}CoNO_{4}
Molar mass	172.969 g·mol^{−1}
Appearance	red oil
Density	1.47 g/cm^{3}
Melting point	−1.1 °C (30.0 °F; 272.0 K)
Boiling point	50 °C (122 °F; 323 K)

Hazards
- Occupational safety and health (OHS/OSH)
Main hazards	toxic
- Except where otherwise noted, data are given for materials in their standard state (at 25 °C [77 °F], 100 kPa). Infobox references

Cobalt tricarbonyl nitrosyl is the organocobalt compound with the formula Co(CO)_{3}(NO). It is a dark red volatile oil that is soluble in nonpolar solvents. The compound is one of the simplest metal nitrosyls. It is highly toxic, reminiscent of the same property for nickel tetracarbonyl.

== Synthesis and reactions ==
Cobalt tricarbonyl nitrosyl is prepared by the treatment of dicobalt octacarbonyl with nitric oxide:

Co_{2}(CO)_{8} + 2 NO → 2 Co(CO)_{3}NO + 2 CO

Many other methods have been developed.

The complex undergoes substitution readily by Lewis bases such as tertiary phosphines and isocyanides, concomitant with loss of CO.
