= Tetrarhodium dodecacarbonyl =

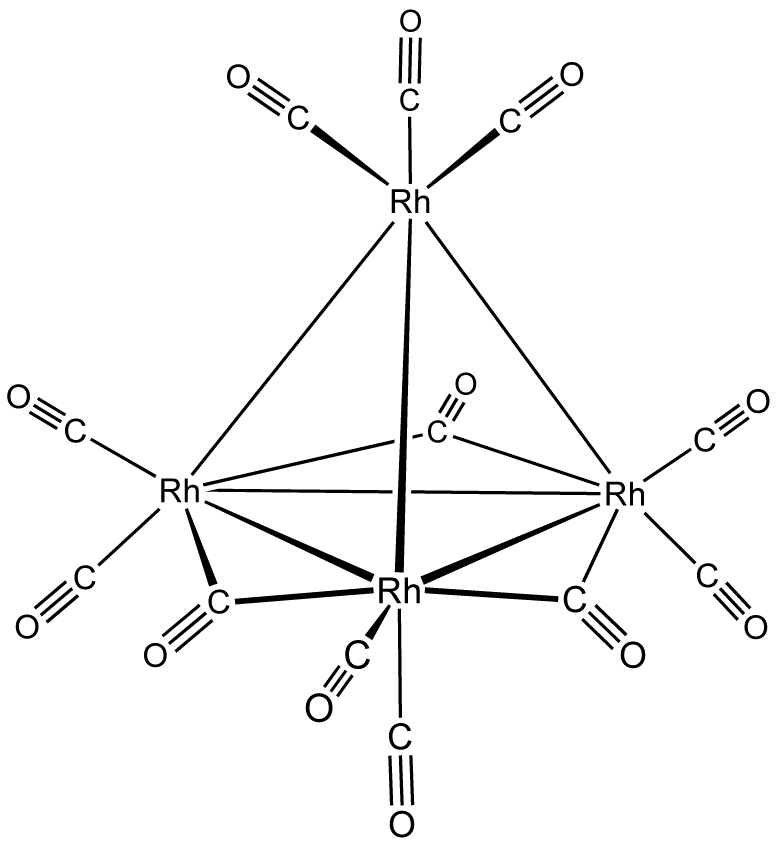

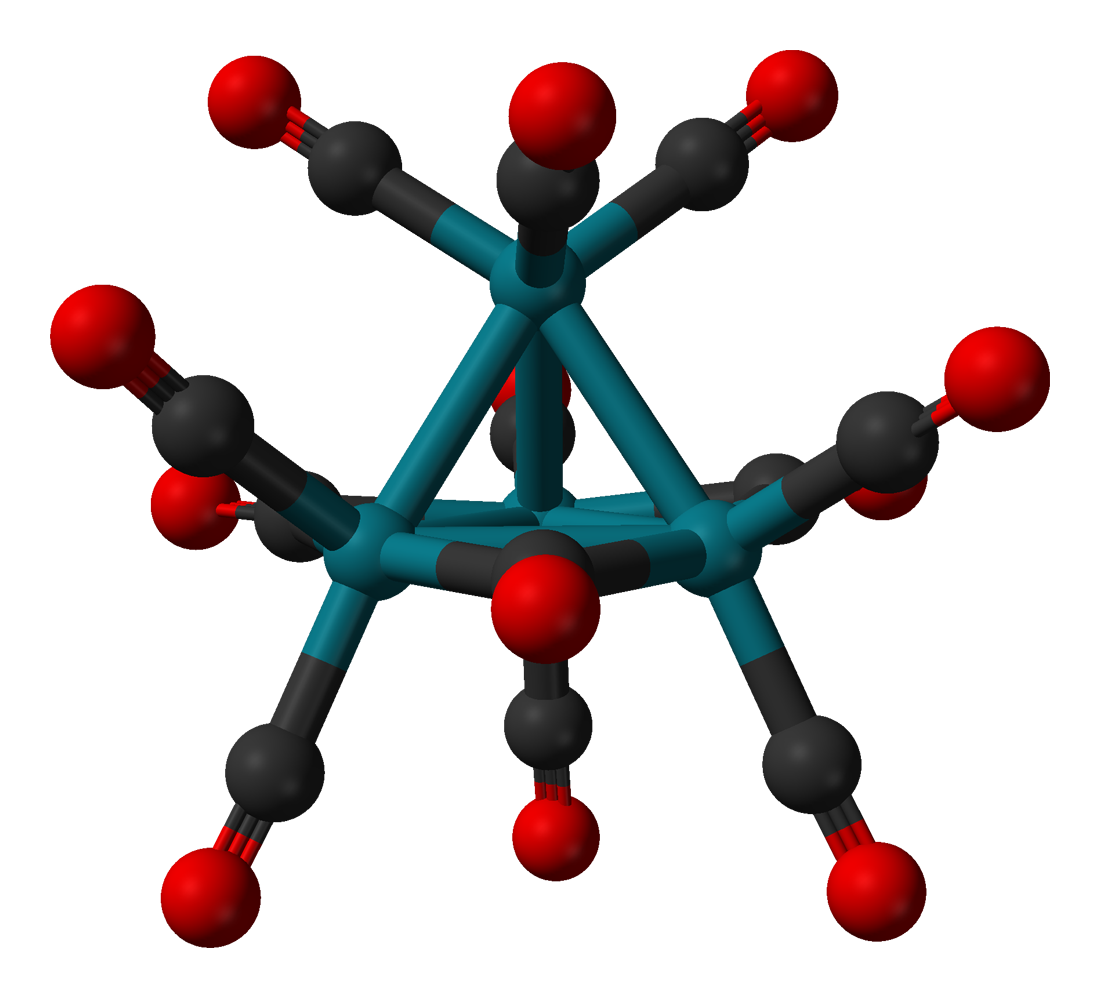

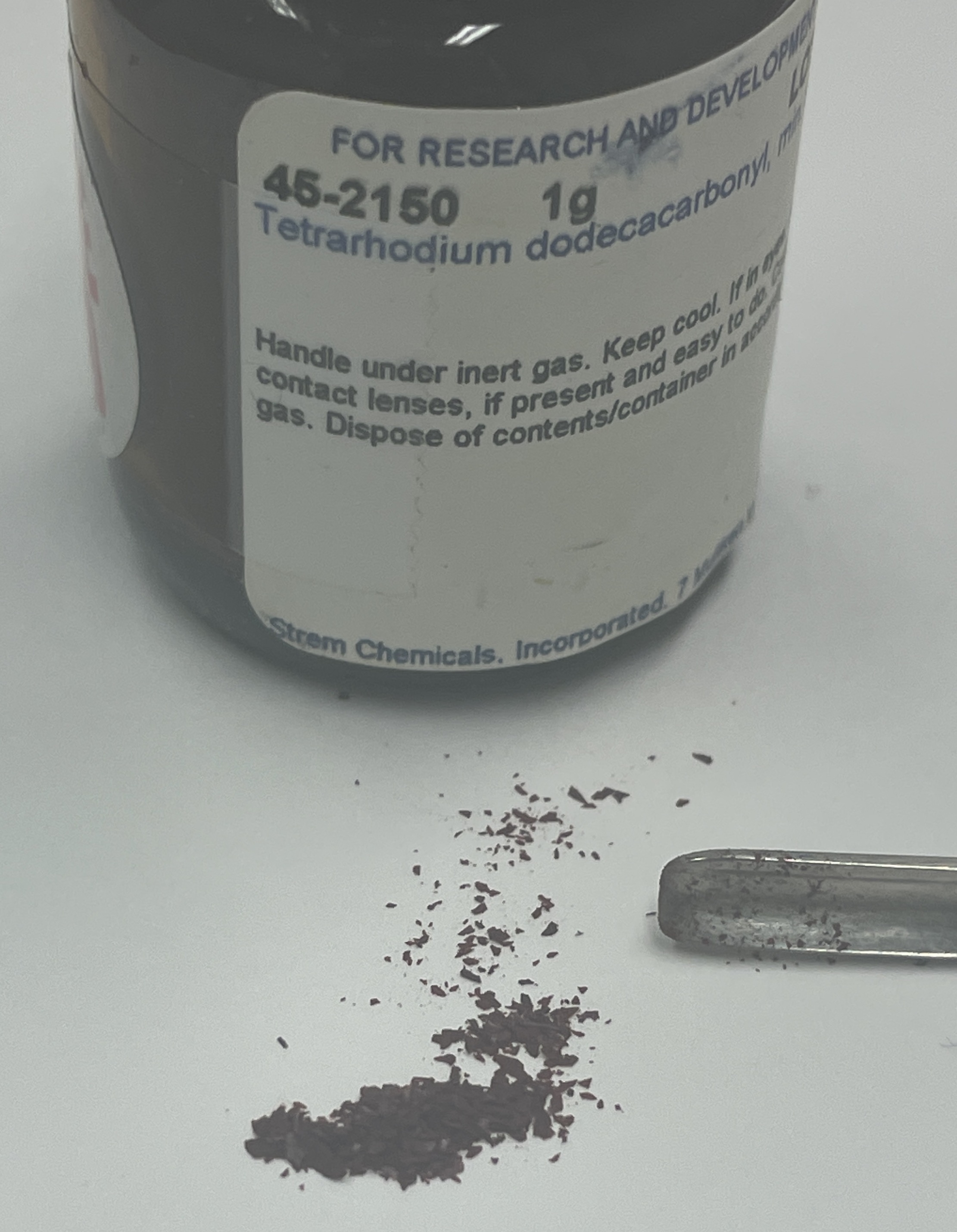

Names
- IUPAC name tri-μ-carbonyl-1:2κ^{2}C;1:3κ^{2}C;2:3κ^{2}C-nonacarbonyl- 1κ^{2}C,2κ^{2}C,3κ^{2}C,4κ^{3}C-[T_{d}-(13)-Δ^{4}-closo]-tetrarhodium(6 Rh—Rh)
- Other names rhodium(0) carbonyl; rhodium carbonyl; rhodium dodecacarbonyl

Identifiers
CAS Number	19584-30-6
3D model (JSmol)	Interactive image
ChemSpider	8115932
ECHA InfoCard	100.039.232
EC Number	243-171-9
PubChem CID	9940312
CompTox Dashboard (EPA)	DTXSID90941352
- InChI: InChI=1S/12CO.4Rh/c12*1-2;;;; Key: LVGLLYVYRZMJIN-UHFFFAOYSA-N
- SMILES: [Rh-2]1235(C#[O+])(C#[O+])C(=O)[Rh-2]246(C#[O+])(C#[O+])C(=O)[Rh-2]34(C#[O+])(C#[O+])(C1=O)[Rh-3]56(C#[O+])(C#[O+])C#[O+]

Properties
Chemical formula	Rh_{4}(CO)_{12}
Molar mass	747.743 g/mol
Appearance	Red crystals
Solubility	Chlorocarbons, toluene, tetrahydrofuran

Hazards
- GHS labelling
Pictograms	(GHS07: Exclamation mark)
Signal word	Warning
Hazard statements	H302, H312, H332
Precautionary statements	P261, P264, P270, P271, P280, P301+P312, P302+P352, P304+P312, P304+P340, P312, P322, P330, P363, P501

Related compounds
Other cations	Tetracobalt dodecacarbonyl, Tetrairidium dodecacarbonyl
Related compounds	Rhodium(III) chloride, Rh_{6}(CO)_{16}, Rh_{2}(CO)_{4}Cl_{2}
- Except where otherwise noted, data are given for materials in their standard state (at 25 °C [77 °F], 100 kPa). verify (what is ?) Infobox references

Tetrarhodium dodecacarbonyl is the chemical compound with the formula Rh_{4}(CO)_{12}. This dark-red crystalline solid is the smallest binary rhodium carbonyl that can be handled as a solid under ambient conditions. It is used as a catalyst in organic synthesis.

== Structure ==
According to X-ray crystallography, Rh_{4}(CO)_{12} features a tetrahedral array of four Rh atoms with nine terminal CO ligands and three bridging CO ligands. The structure can be expressed as Rh_{4}(CO)_{9}(μ-CO)_{3}.

== Synthesis ==
Rh_{4}(CO)_{12} is prepared by treatment of an aqueous solution of rhodium trichloride with activated copper metal under an atmosphere of CO.

4 RhCl_{3}(H_{2}O)_{3} + 8 Cu + 22 CO → Rh_{4}(CO)_{12} + 2 CO_{2} + 8 Cu(CO)Cl + 4 HCl + 10 H_{2}O

Alternatively, the compound can be prepared by treatment of a methanolic solution of RhCl_{3}(H_{2}O)_{3} with CO to afford H[RhCl_{2}(CO)_{2}], followed by carbonylation in the presence of sodium citrate.

== Reactions ==
The cluster undergoes thermal substitution with phosphine ligands, L:

Rh_{4}(CO)_{12} + n L → Rh_{4}(CO)_{12-n}L_{n} + n CO

Tetrarhodium dodecacarbonyl quantitatively decomposes in boiling hexane to afford hexadecacarbonylhexarhodium:

3 Rh_{4}(CO)_{12} → 2 Rh_{6}(CO)_{16} + 4 CO

== Related metal carbonyls ==
Because of their relevance to hydroformylation catalysis, rhodium carbonyls have been systematically studied to a high degree. The instability of Rh_{2}(CO)_{8} has been a source of curiosity. The analogous binary carbonyl of cobalt, Co_{2}(CO)_{8}, is well known. Solutions of Rh_{4}(CO)_{12} under high pressures of CO convert to the dirhodium compound:

Rh_{4}(CO)_{12} + 4 CO → 2 Rh_{2}(CO)_{8}

Unlike Co_{2}(CO)_{8} which features bridging carbonyls, the main isomer of Rh_{2}(CO)_{8} features only terminal CO ligands. The relative instability of Rh_{2}(CO)_{8} is analogous to the tendency of Ru(CO)_{5} to convert to Ru_{3}(CO)_{12}.

== General reading ==
- King, R. B., "Rhodium: Organometallic Chemistry" Encyclopedia of Inorganic Chemistry 1994, 7, 3494.
