= Organocobalt chemistry =

Chemistry of compounds with a carbon to cobalt bond

Vitamin B12 and related cofactors are organocobalt compounds.

Organocobalt chemistry is the chemistry of organometallic compounds containing a carbon to cobalt chemical bond. Organocobalt compounds are involved in several organic reactions and the important biomolecule vitamin B_{12} has a cobalt-carbon bond. Many organocobalt compounds exhibit useful catalytic properties, the preeminent example being dicobalt octacarbonyl.

== Alkyl complexes ==
Co(4-norbornyl)_{4} is a rare example of a low-spin tetrahedral complex and a rare case of an organocobalt(V) derivative.

Most fundamental are the cobalt complexes with only alkyl ligands. Examples include Co(4-norbornyl)_{4} and its cation.

Alkylcobalt is represented by vitamin B_{12} and related enzymes. In methylcobalamin the ligand is a methyl group, which is electrophilic. in vitamin B12, the alkyl ligand is an adenosyl group. Related to vitamin B12 are cobalt porphyrins, dimethylglyoximates, and related complexes of Schiff base ligands. These synthetic compounds also form alkyl derivatives that undergo diverse reactions reminiscent of the biological processes. The weak cobalt(III)-carbon bond in vitamin B12 analogues can be exploited in a type of Cobalt mediated radical polymerization of acrylic and vinyl esters (e.g. vinyl acetate), acrylic acid, and acrylonitrile.

== Carbonyl complexes ==
Dicobalt octacarbonyl is produced by the carbonylation of cobalt salts. It and its phosphine derivatives are among the most widely used organocobalt compounds. Heating Co_{2}(CO)_{8} gives Co_{4}(CO)_{12}. Very elaborate cobalt-carbonyl clusters have been prepared starting from these complexes. Heating cobalt carbonyl with bromoform gives methylidynetricobaltnonacarbonyl. Dicobalt octacarbonyl also reacts with alkynes to give dicobalt hexacarbonyl acetylene complexes with the formula Co_{2}(CO)_{6}(C_{2}R_{2}). Because they can be removed later, the cobalt carbonyl centers function as a protective group for the alkyne. In the Nicholas reaction an alkyne group is also protected and at the same time the alpha-carbon position is activated for nucleophilic substitution.

== Cp, allyl, and alkene compounds ==
=== Sandwich compounds ===
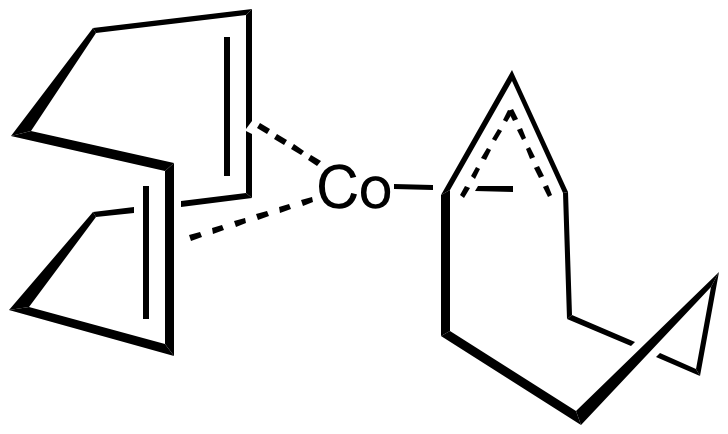
Co(1,5-cyclooctadiene)(cyclooctenyl).

Organocobalt compounds are known with alkene, allyl, diene, and Cp ligands. A famous sandwich compound is cobaltocene, a rare example of low-spin Co(II) complex. This 19-electron metallocene is used as a reducing agent and as a source of CpCo. Other sandwich compounds are CoCp(C_{6}Me_{6}) and Co(C_{6}Me_{6})_{2}, with 20 electrons and 21 electrons, respectively. Reduction of anhydrous cobalt(II) chloride with sodium in the presence of cyclooctadiene gives Co(cyclooctadiene)(cyclooctenyl), a versatile reagent.

=== CpCo(CO)_{2} and derivatives ===
The half-sandwich compounds of the type CpCoL_{2} have been well-investigated (L = CO, alkene). The complexes CpCo(C_{2}H_{4})_{2} and CpCo(cod) catalyze alkyne trimerisation, which has been applied to the synthesis of a variety of complex structures.

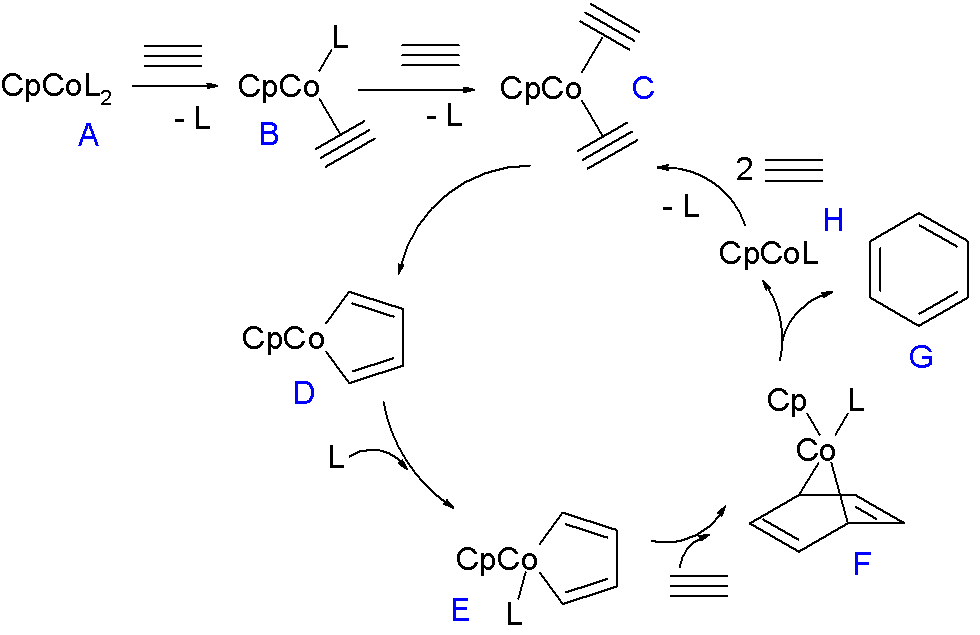
Mechanism proposed for trimerisation of alkyne to give arenes.

== Applications ==
Mechanism of cobalt-catalyzed hydroformylation. The process begins with dissociation of CO from cobalt tetracarbonyl hydride to give the 16-electron species (step 1). Subsequent binding of alkene gives an 18e species (step 2). In step 3, the olefin inserts to give the 16e alkyl tricarbonyl. Coordination of another equivalent of CO give alkyl tetracarbonyl (step 4). Migratory insertion of CO gives the 16e acyl in step 5. In step 6, oxidative addition of hydrogen gives a dihydrido complex, which in step 7 releases aldehyde by reductive elimination. Step 8 is unproductive and reversible.

Dicobalt octacarbonyl is used commercially for hydroformylation of alkenes. A key intermediate is cobalt tetracarbonyl hydride (HCo(CO)_{4}). Processes involving cobalt are practiced commercially mainly for the production of C7-C14 alcohols used for the production of surfactants. Many hydroformylations have switched from cobalt-based processes to rhodium-based processes, despite the great expense of that metal. Replacing H_{2} by water or an alcohol, the reaction product is a carboxylic acid or an ester. An example of this reaction type is the conversion of butadiene to adipic acid. Cobalt catalysts (together with iron) are relevant in the Fischer–Tropsch process in which it is assumed that organocobalt intermediates form.

Cobalt complexes have been applies to the synthesis of pyridine derivatives starting from alkynes and nitriles.

=== Aspirational applications ===
Although really only dicobalt octacarbonyl has achieved commercial success, many reports have appeared promising applications. Often these ventures are motivated by the use of "earth abundant" catalysts.
