= Hexadecacarbonylhexarhodium =

Names
- IUPAC name Hexadecacarbonylhexarhodium
- Other names Hexarhodium hexadecacarbonyl

Identifiers
CAS Number	28407-51-4
3D model (JSmol)	Interactive image
ChemSpider	9041327
ECHA InfoCard	100.044.539
EC Number	249-009-3
PubChem CID	10866043
CompTox Dashboard (EPA)	DTXSID10951074
- InChI: InChI=1S/16CO.6Rh/c16*1-2;;;;;; Key: SZQABOJVTZVBHE-UHFFFAOYSA-N
- SMILES: [C-]#[O+].[C-]#[O+].[C-]#[O+].[C-]#[O+].[C-]#[O+].[C-]#[O+].[C-]#[O+].[C-]#[O+].[C-]#[O+].[C-]#[O+].[C-]#[O+].[C-]#[O+].[C-]#[O+].[C-]#[O+].[C-]#[O+].[C-]#[O+].[Rh].[Rh].[Rh].[Rh].[Rh].[Rh]

Properties
Chemical formula	C_{16}O_{16}Rh_{6}
Molar mass	1065.62 g/mol
Appearance	purple-brown solid
Melting point	235 °C (455 °F; 508 K)

Hazards
- GHS labelling
Pictograms	(GHS07: Exclamation mark)
Signal word	Warning
Hazard statements	H302, H312, H332
Precautionary statements	P261, P264, P270, P271, P280, P301+P312, P302+P352, P304+P312, P304+P340, P312, P322, P330, P363, P501
- Except where otherwise noted, data are given for materials in their standard state (at 25 °C [77 °F], 100 kPa). verify (what is ?) Infobox references

Hexadecacarbonylhexarhodium is a metal carbonyl cluster with the formula Rh_{6}(CO)_{16}. It exists as purple-brown crystals that are slightly soluble in dichloromethane and chloroform. It is the principal binary carbonyl of rhodium.

== Discovery and synthesis ==
Rh_{6}(CO)_{16} was first prepared by Walter Hieber in 1943 by carbonylation of RhCl_{3}·3H_{2}O at 80–230 °C and 200 atm carbon monoxide with silver or copper as a halide acceptor. Hieber correctly formulated the compound as a binary carbonyl, but suggested the formula Rh_{4}(CO)_{11}, i.e., CO/Rh ratio of 2.75. The correct formula and structure was subsequently established by Dahl et al. using X-ray crystallography. The correct CO/Rh ratio is 2.66.

Relative to the original preparation, the carbonylation of a mixture of anhydrous rhodium trichloride and iron pentacarbonyl was shown to give good yields of Rh_{6}(CO)_{16}. Other compounds of rhodium are also effective precursors such as [(CO)_{2}Rh(μ-Cl)]_{2} and rhodium(II) acetate:

3 Rh_{2}(O_{2}CCH_{3})_{4} + 22 CO + 6 H_{2}O → Rh_{6}(CO)_{16} + 6 CO_{2} + 12 CH_{3}COOH

3 [(CO)_{2}RhCl]_{2} + 4 CO + 6 Cu → Rh_{6}(CO)_{16} + 6 CuCl

It also arises quantitatively by thermal decomposition of tetrarhodium dodecacarbonyl in boiling hexane:

3 Rh_{4}(CO)_{12} → 2 Rh_{6}(CO)_{16} + 4 CO

== Reactions ==
At least some of the CO ligands can be displaced by donor ligands.

Rh_{6}(CO)_{16} catalyzes a number of organic reactions including hydrogenation and hydroformylation.
