= Tetrairidium dodecacarbonyl =

Chemical compound

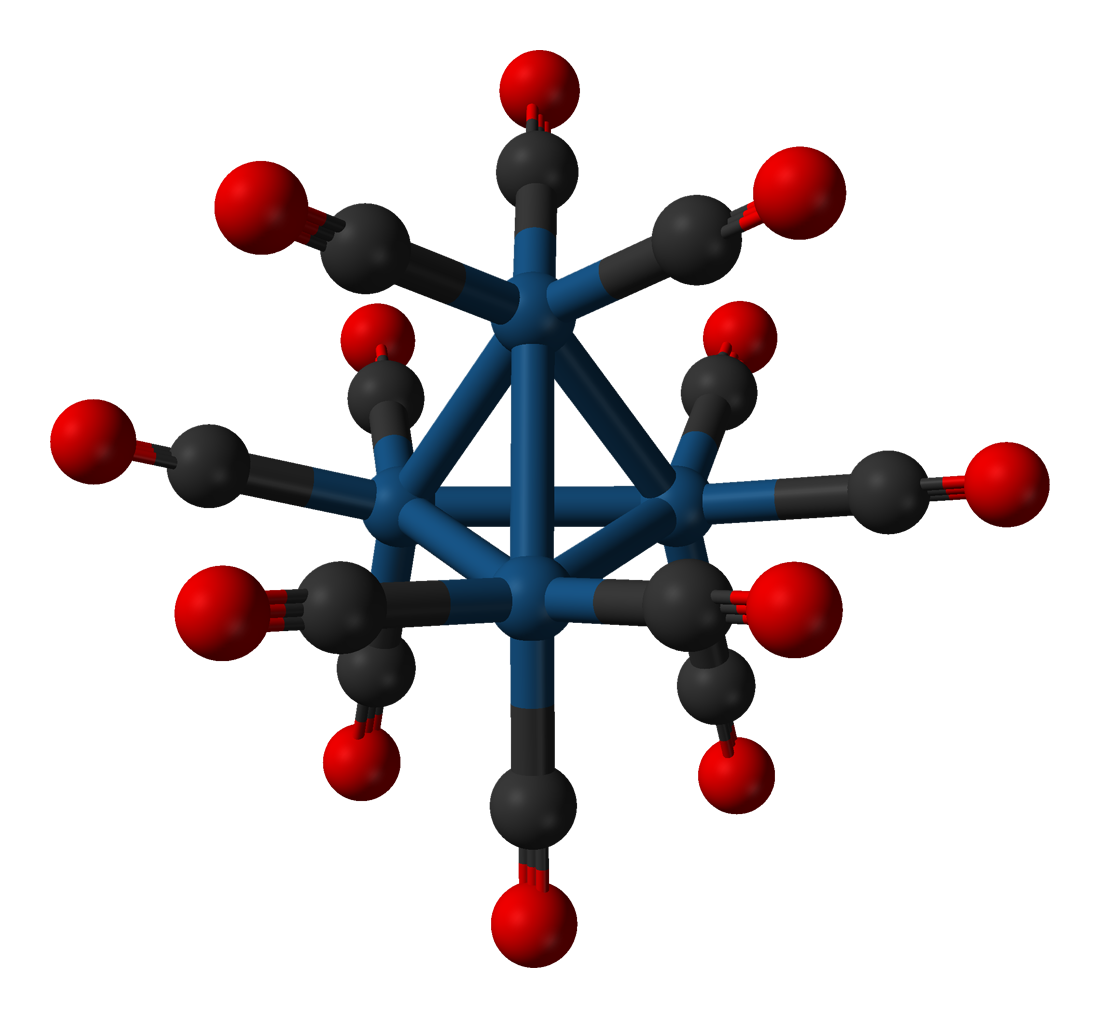

Names
- IUPAC names dodecacarbonyl-1κ^{3}C,2κ^{3}C,3κ^{3}C,4κ^{3}C-[T_{d}-(13)-Δ^{4}-closo]-tetrairidium(6 Ir—Ir) tetrahedro-tetrakis(tricarbonyliridium)(6 Ir—Ir)
- Other names: Iridium(0) carbonyl; Iridium carbonyl; Iridium dodecacarbonyl

Identifiers
CAS Number	18827-81-1
3D model (JSmol)	Interactive image
ChemSpider	21171017
ECHA InfoCard	100.038.718
EC Number	242-607-5
PubChem CID	16211901
CompTox Dashboard (EPA)	DTXSID80474907
- InChI: InChI=1S/12CO.4Ir/c12*1-2;;;; Key: XWDKRVSSHIJNJP-UHFFFAOYSA-N
- SMILES: [O+]#C[Ir-3]12(C#[O+])(C#[O+])[Ir-3]3(C#[O+])(C#[O+])(C#[O+])[Ir-3]1(C#[O+])(C#[O+])(C#[O+])[Ir-3]23(C#[O+])(C#[O+])C#[O+]

Properties
Chemical formula	Ir_{4}(CO)_{12}
Molar mass	1104.92 g/mol
Appearance	Canary-yellow crystals
Melting point	195 °C (383 °F; 468 K)
Solubility	Soluble in chlorocarbons, toluene, tetrahydrofuran

Related compounds
Related compounds	Tetrarhodium dodecacarbonyl
- Except where otherwise noted, data are given for materials in their standard state (at 25 °C [77 °F], 100 kPa). verify (what is ?) Infobox references

Tetrairidium dodecacarbonyl is the chemical compound with the formula Ir_{4}(CO)_{12}. This tetrahedral cluster is the most common and most stable "binary" carbonyl of iridium. This air-stable species is only poorly soluble in organic solvents. It has been used to prepare bimetallic clusters and catalysts, e.g. for the water gas shift reaction, and reforming, but these studies are of purely academic interest.

== Structure ==
Each Ir center is octahedral, being bonded to 3 other iridium atoms and three terminal CO ligands. Ir_{4}(CO)_{12} has T_{d} symmetry with an average Ir-Ir distances of 2.693 Å. The related clusters Rh_{4}(CO)_{12} and Co_{4}(CO)_{12} have C_{3v} symmetry because of the presence of three bridging CO ligands in each.

== Preparation ==
It is prepared in two steps by reductive carbonylation of hydrated iridium trichloride. The first step gives [Ir(CO)_{2}Cl_{2}]^{−}.

IrCl_{3} + 3 CO + H_{2}O → [Ir(CO)_{2}Cl_{2}]^{−} + CO_{2} + 2 H^{+} + Cl^{−}
4 [Ir(CO)_{2}Cl_{2}]^{−} + 6 CO + 2 H_{2}O → Ir_{4}(CO)_{12} + 2 CO_{2} + 4 H^{+} + 8 Cl^{−}
