= Nicholas reaction =

The Nicholas reaction is an organic reaction where a dicobalt octacarbonyl-stabilized propargylic cation is reacted with a nucleophile. Oxidative demetallation gives the desired alkylated alkyne. It is named after Kenneth M. Nicholas.

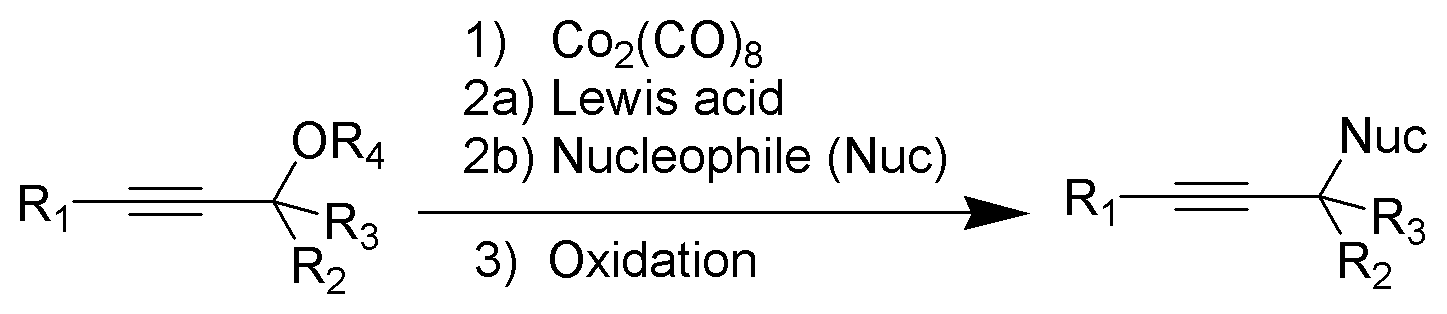
The Nicholas reaction

Several reviews have been published.

== Reaction mechanism ==
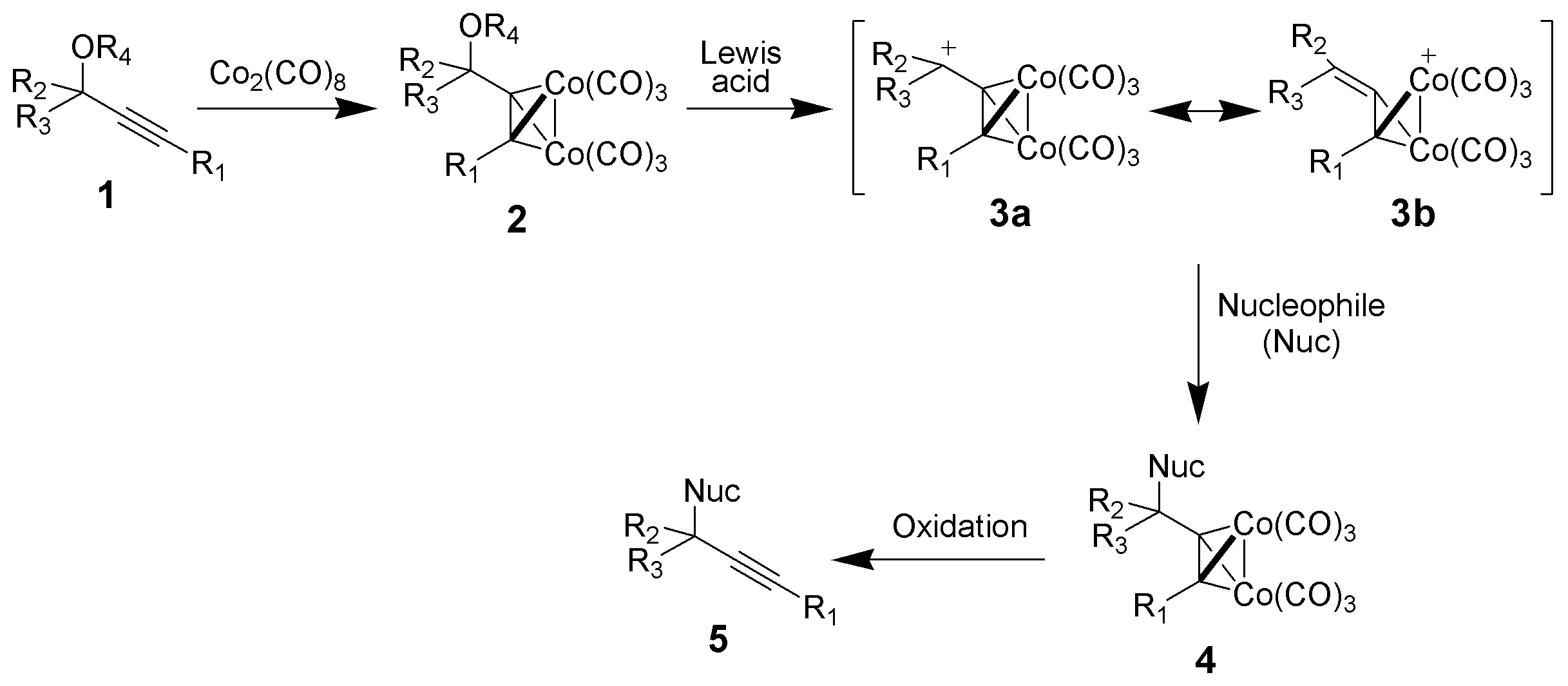
The mechanism of the Nicholas reaction

The addition of dicobalt octacarbonyl to the alkyne of propargylic ether (1) gives the dicobalt intermediate 2. Reaction with tetrafluoroboric acid or a Lewis acid gives the key dicobalt octacarbonyl-stabilized propargylic cation (3a and 3b). Addition of a nucleophile followed by a mild oxidation gives the substituted alkyne (5).

The likely reaction intermediate in the process, [(propargylium)Co_{2}(CO)_{6}]^{+} cation 3, possesses considerable stability. It was, in fact, possible to observe these cations by ^{1}H-NMR at 10 °C when generated using d-trifluoroacetic acid. Later, Richard E. Connor and Nicholas were able to isolate salts of such cations 3 as stable, dark red solids by treatment of the Co_{2}(CO)_{6}-complexed propargyl alcohols with excess fluoroantimonic acid or tetrafluoroboric acid etherate. The reason that these complexes are so remarkably stable is due to significant delocalization of the cationic charge onto the Co_{2}(CO)_{6} moiety. Experimental evidence for the charge delocalization includes an increase in the IR absorption frequencies of the carbon–oxygen bonds of the cobalt–carbonyl in the cationic intermediates compared with those in the parent alcohols. Also, when the cation is formed, the orbital hybridisation of the central carbon changes from sp^{3} to sp^{2}. This causes the atoms to exhibit a trigonal–planar arrangement and shortens the covalent bonds around the central carbon in the cation due to the increase in s character.

== See also ==
- Pauson–Khand reaction
