= Cobalt tetracarbonyl hydride =

Names
- Other names cobalt hydrocarbonyl tetracarbonylhydridocobalt Tetracarbonylhydrocobalt; Hydrocobalt tetracarbonyl

Identifiers
CAS Number	16842-03-8
3D model (JSmol)	Interactive image
ChemSpider	21247609
ECHA InfoCard	100.290.757
PubChem CID	61848
RTECS number	GG0900000
UNII	33B757V1YU
UN number	3281
CompTox Dashboard (EPA)	DTXSID70937490
- InChI: InChI=1S/4CO.Co.H/c4*1-2;; Key: KFQDAZBBZFLQPV-UHFFFAOYSA-N
- SMILES: O=C=[CoH](=C=O)(=C=O)=C=O

Properties
Chemical formula	C_{4}HCoO_{4}
Molar mass	171.98 g/mol
Appearance	Light yellow liquid
Odor	offensive, intolerable, nauseating
Melting point	−26.2 °C (−15.2 °F; 247.0 K)
Boiling point	47 °C (117 °F; 320 K)
Solubility in water	0.05% (20 °C)
Solubility	soluble in hexane, toluene, ethanol
Vapor pressure	>1 atm (20 °C)
Acidity (pK_{a})	1 (in water); 8.3 (in acetonitrile)

Hazards
- Occupational safety and health (OHS/OSH)
Main hazards	flammable, decomposes in air
- NIOSH (US health exposure limits)
PEL (Permissible)	none
REL (Recommended)	TWA 0.1 mg/m^{3}
IDLH (Immediate danger)	N.D.
- Except where otherwise noted, data are given for materials in their standard state (at 25 °C [77 °F], 100 kPa). verify (what is ?) Infobox references

Cobalt tetracarbonyl hydride is an organometallic compound with the formula HCo(CO)_{4}. It is a volatile, yellow liquid that forms a colorless vapor and has an intolerable odor. The compound readily decomposes upon melt and in absentia of high CO partial pressures forms Co_{2}(CO)_{8}. Despite operational challenges associated with its handling, the compound has received considerable attention for its ability to function as a catalyst in hydroformylation. In this respect, HCo(CO)_{4} and related derivatives have received significant academic interest for their ability to mediate a variety of carbonylation (introduction of CO into inorganic compounds) reactions.

== Structure and properties ==
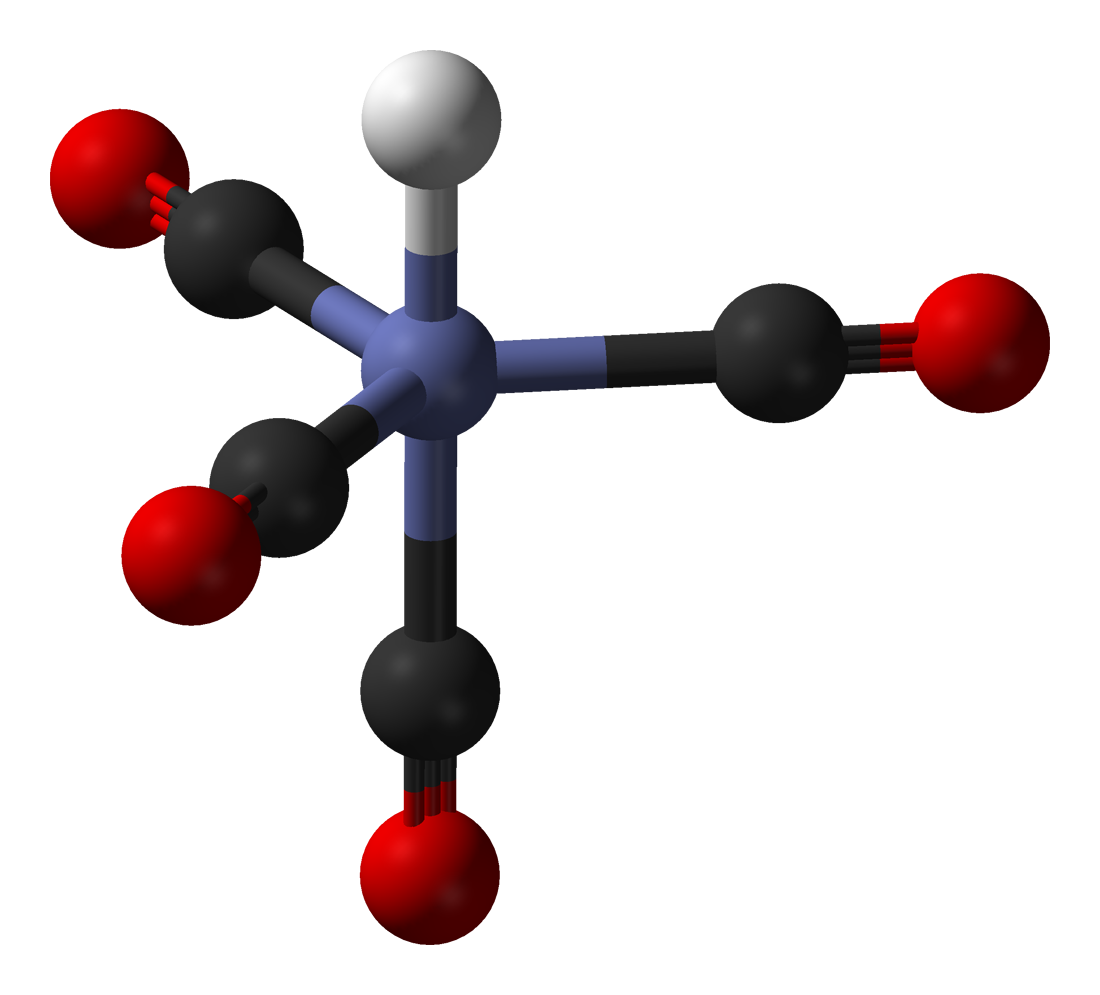

HCo(CO)_{4} adopts trigonal bipyramidal structure, with the hydride ligand occupying one of the axial positions, giving an overall symmetry of C_{3v}. The three equatorial CO ligands are slightly bent out of the equatorial plane. The Co–CO and Co–H bond distances were determined by gas-phase electron diffraction to be 1.764 and 1.556 Å, respectively.

Assuming the presence of a formal hydride ion, the oxidation state of cobalt in this compound is +1. But unlike some other transition-metal hydride complexes, HCo(CO)_{4} is highly acidic, with a pK_{a} of 8.5.

The complex readily undergoes substitution by tertiary phosphines and other Lewis bases. For example, triphenylphosphine gives HCo(CO)_{3}PPh_{3} and HCo(CO)_{2}(PPh_{3})_{2}. These derivatives are more stable than HCo(CO)_{4} and are used industrially to improve catalyst selectivity in hydroformylation. These derivatives are generally less acidic than HCo(CO)_{4}.

The compound decomposes easily. It is colorless when pure, but, soon after melting, develops a yellow tinge due to decomposition to cobalt tetracarbonyl dimer.

== Preparation ==
Tetracarbonylhydrocobalt was first described by Hieber in the early 1930s. It was the second transition metal hydride to be discovered, after H_{2}Fe(CO)_{4}. Laboratory samples are prepared typically from the Brønsted conjugate base, Co(CO)^{−}_{4}. The latter can be produced from direct carbonylation of cobaltous salts in base, possibly with a cysteine catalyst...

2 Co(NO_{3})_{2} + 11 CO + 12 KOH → 2 KCo(CO)_{4} + 4 KNO_{3} + 3 K_{2}CO_{3} + 6 H_{2}O

...or applying a reducing agent like sodium amalgam to Co_{2}(CO)_{8}, which gives sodium tetracarbonylcobaltate:

Co_{2}(CO)_{8} + 2 Na → 2 NaCo(CO)_{4}
NaCo(CO)_{4} + H^{+} → HCo(CO)_{4} + Na^{+}

Since HCo(CO)_{4} decomposes so readily, it is usually generated in situ by hydrogenation of Co_{2}(CO)_{8}.

Co_{2}(CO)_{8} + H_{2} ⇌ 2 HCo(CO)_{4}

The thermodynamic parameters for the equilibrium reaction were determined by infrared spectroscopy to be ΔH = 4.054 kcal mol^{−1}, ΔS = −3.067 cal mol^{−1} K^{−1}.

== Applications ==
Tetracarbonylhydridocobalt was the first transition metal hydride to be used in industry. In 1953 evidence was disclosed that it is the active catalyst for the conversion of alkenes, CO, and H_{2} to aldehydes, a process known as hydroformylation (oxo reaction). Although the use of cobalt-based hydroformylation has since been largely superseded by rhodium-based catalysts, the world output of C_{3}–C_{18} aldehydes produced by tetracarbonylhydrocobalt catalysis is about 100,000 tons per year, roughly 2% of the total.
