= Dicobalt octacarbonyl =

Chemical compound

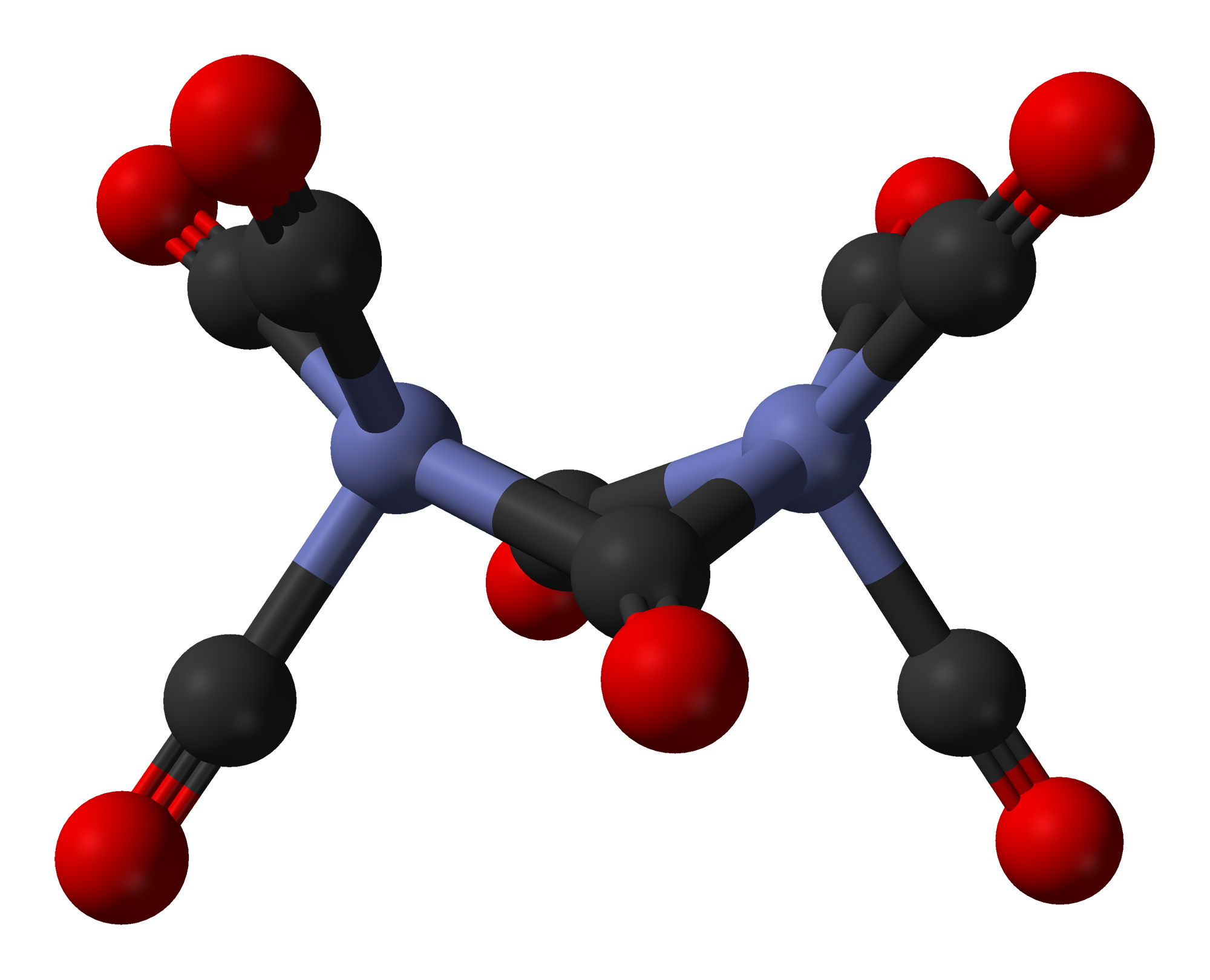
- Dicobalt octacarbonyl, bridged C2v isomer

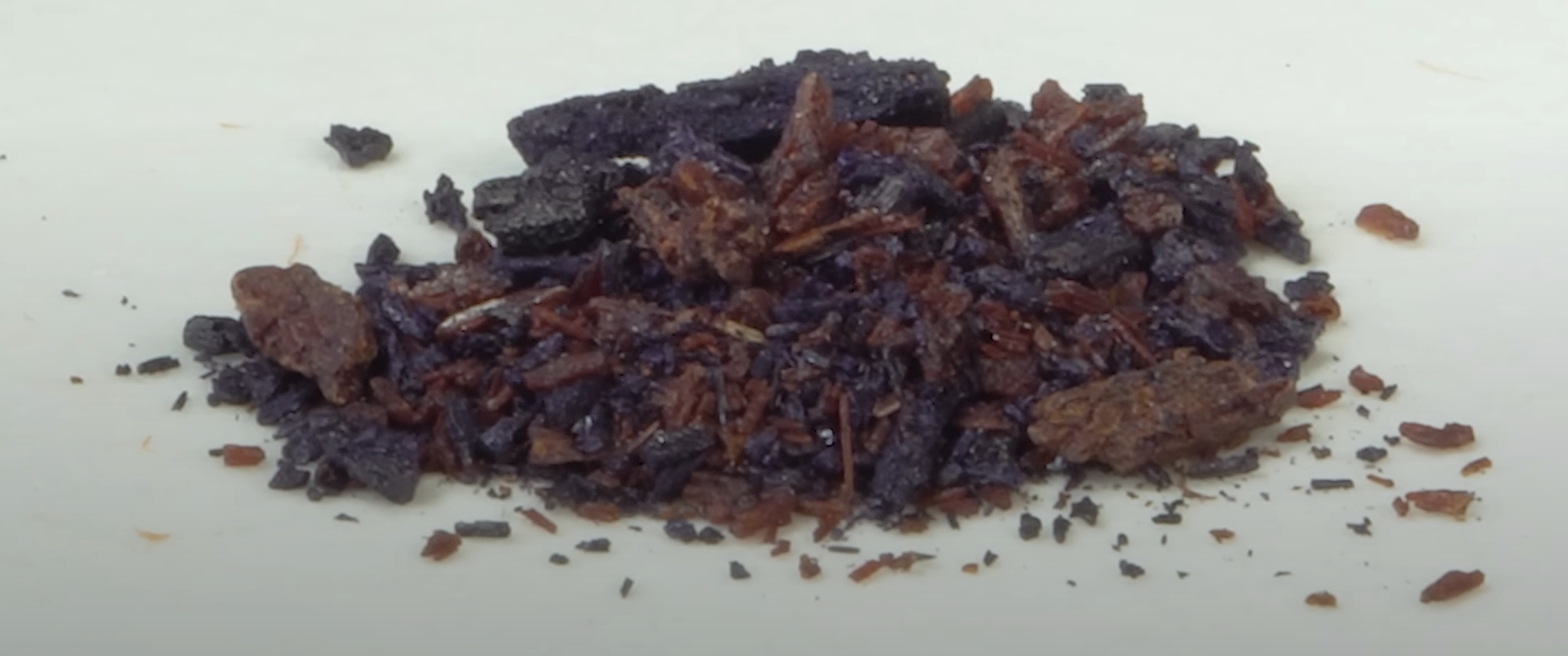
- Co_{2}(CO)_{8} soaked in hexanes

Names
- IUPAC name Octacarbonyldicobalt(Co—Co)
- Other names Cobalt carbonyl (2:8), di-mu-Carbonylhexacarbonyldicobalt, Cobalt octacarbonyl, Cobalt tetracarbonyl dimer, Dicobalt carbonyl, Octacarbonyldicobalt

Identifiers
CAS Number	10210-68-1
3D model (JSmol)	Interactive image; Interactive image
ChemSpider	2007057
ECHA InfoCard	100.030.454
EC Number	233-514-0
PubChem CID	25049
RTECS number	GG0300000
UNII	MDH533S43Q
UN number	3281
CompTox Dashboard (EPA)	DTXSID10895040
- InChI: InChI=1S/8CO.2Co/c8*1-2;;/q;;;;;;;;2*+2 Key: MQIKJSYMMJWAMP-UHFFFAOYSA-N; InChI=1/8CO.2Co/c8*1-2;;/q;;;;;;;;2*+2 Key: MQIKJSYMMJWAMP-UHFFFAOYAG
- SMILES: O=C=[Co]1(=C=O)(=C=O)C(=O)[Co](=C=O)(=C=O)(=C=O)C1=O; O=C=[Co-4](=C=O)(=C=O)(=C=O)[Co-4](=C=O)(=C=O)(=C=O)=C=O

Properties
Chemical formula	Co_{2}(CO)_{8}
Molar mass	341.95 g/mol
Appearance	red-orange crystals
Density	1.87 g/cm^{3}
Melting point	51 to 52 °C (124 to 126 °F; 324 to 325 K)
Boiling point	52 °C (126 °F; 325 K) decomposes
Solubility in water	insoluble
Vapor pressure	0.7 mmHg (20 °C)

Structure
Dipole moment	1.33 D (C_{2v} isomer); 0 D (D_{3d} isomer)

Hazards
- Occupational safety and health (OHS/OSH)
Main hazards	Potential carcinogen
- GHS labelling
Pictograms	(GHS02: Flammable) (GHS06: Toxic) (GHS07: Exclamation mark) (GHS08: Health hazard)
Signal word	Danger
Hazard statements	H251, H302, H304, H315, H317, H330, H351, H361, H412
Precautionary statements	P201, P260, P273, P280, P304+P340+P310, P403+P233
NFPA 704 (fire diamond)	4 3 1
Flash point	−23 °C (−9 °F; 250 K)
- Lethal dose or concentration (LD, LC)
LD_{50} (median dose)	15 mg/kg (oral, rat)
- NIOSH (US health exposure limits)
PEL (Permissible)	none
REL (Recommended)	TWA 0.1 mg/m^{3}
IDLH (Immediate danger)	N.D.
Safety data sheet (SDS)	External SDS

Related compounds
Related metal carbonyls	Iron pentacarbonyl Diiron nonacarbonyl Nickel tetracarbonyl
- Except where otherwise noted, data are given for materials in their standard state (at 25 °C [77 °F], 100 kPa). verify (what is ?) Infobox references

Dicobalt octacarbonyl is an organocobalt compound with composition Co_{2}(CO)_{8}. This metal carbonyl is used as a reagent and catalyst in organometallic chemistry and organic synthesis, and is central to much known organocobalt chemistry. It is the parent member of a family of hydroformylation catalysts. Each molecule consists of two cobalt atoms bound to eight carbon monoxide ligands, although multiple structural isomers are known. Some of the carbonyl ligands are labile.

== Synthesis, structure, properties ==
Dicobalt octacarbonyl an orange-colored, pyrophoric solid. It is synthesised by the high pressure carbonylation of cobalt(II) salts:

2 (CH_{3}COO)_{2}Co + 8 CO + 2 H_{2} → Co_{2}(CO)_{8} + 4 CH_{3}COOH

The preparation is often carried out in the presence of cyanide, converting the cobalt(II) salt into a pentacyanocobaltate(II) complex that reacts with carbon monoxide to yield K[Co(CO)_{4}]. Acidification produces cobalt tetracarbonyl hydride, HCo(CO)_{4}, which degrades near room temperature to dicobalt octacarbonyl and hydrogen. It can also be prepared by heating cobalt metal to above 250 °C in a stream of carbon monoxide gas at about 200 to 300 atm:

2 Co + 8 CO → Co_{2}(CO)_{8}

In solution, Co_{2}(CO)_{8} exists as a mixture of two rapidly interconverting isomers :

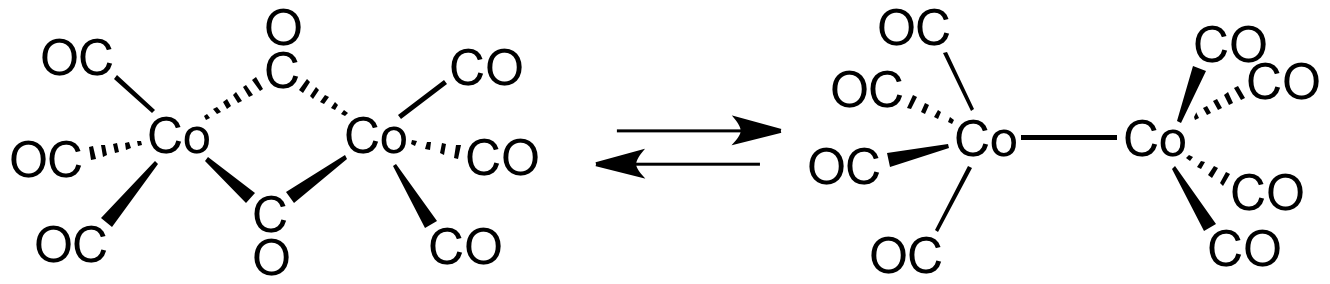

The major isomer (on the left in the above equilibrium process) contains two bridging carbonyl ligands linking the cobalt centres and six terminal carbonyl ligands, three on each metal. It can be summarised by the formula (CO)_{3}Co(μ-CO)_{2}Co(CO)_{3} and has C_{2v} symmetry. This structure resembles diiron nonacarbonyl (Fe_{2}(CO)_{9}) but with one fewer bridging carbonyl. The Co–Co distance is 2.52 Å, and the Co–CO_{terminal} and Co–CO_{bridge} distances are 1.80 and 1.90 Å, respectively. Analysis of the bonding suggests the absence of a direct cobalt–cobalt bond.

The minor isomer has no bridging carbonyl ligands, but instead has a direct bond between the cobalt centres and eight terminal carbonyl ligands, four on each metal atom. It can be summarised by the formula (CO)_{4}Co-Co(CO)_{4} and has D_{4d} symmetry. It features an unbridged cobalt–cobalt bond that is 2.70 Å in length in the solid structure when crystallized together with C_{60}.

Isomers of dicobalt octacarbonyl
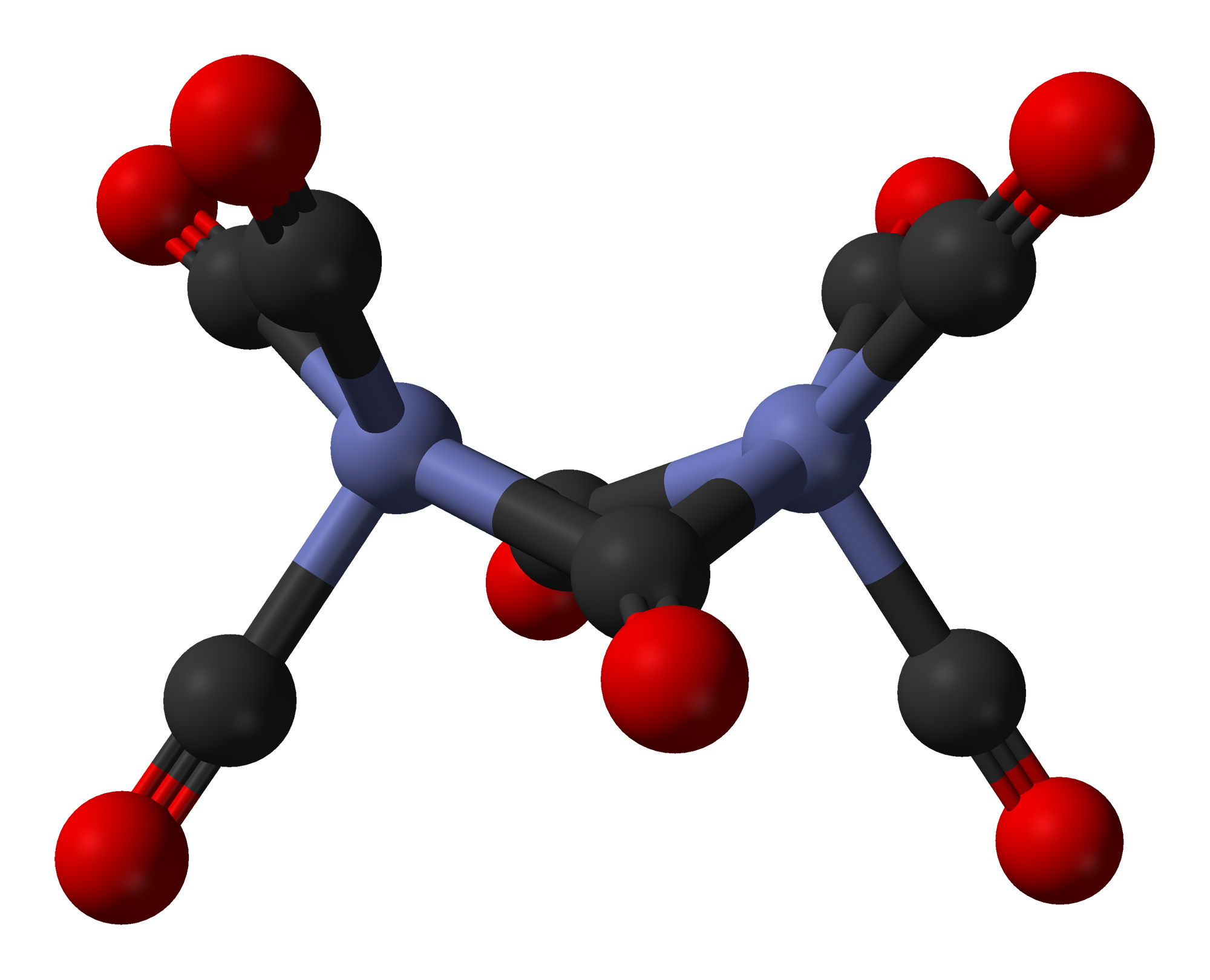
Bridged C_{2v} isomer

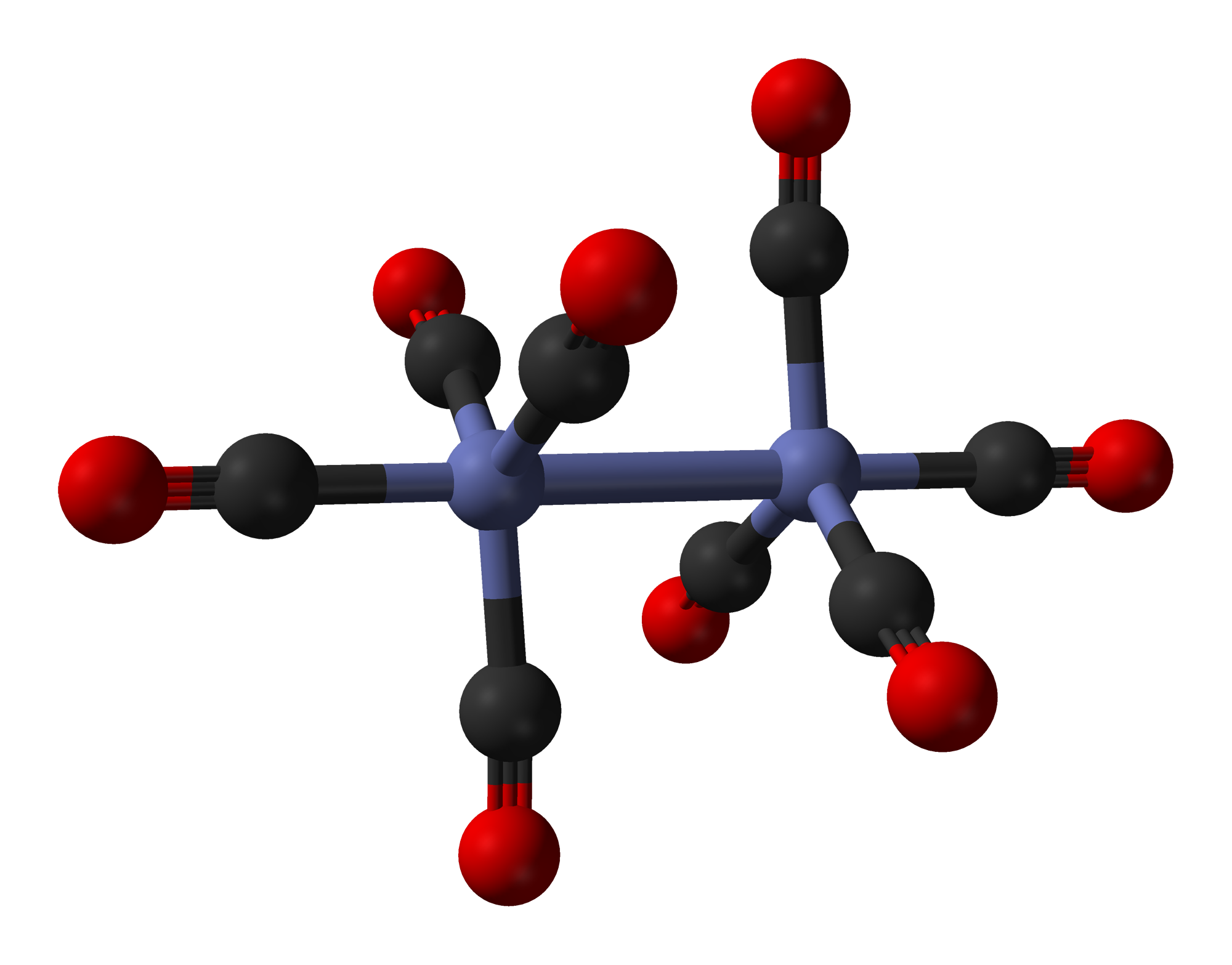
non-bridged D_{3d} isomer

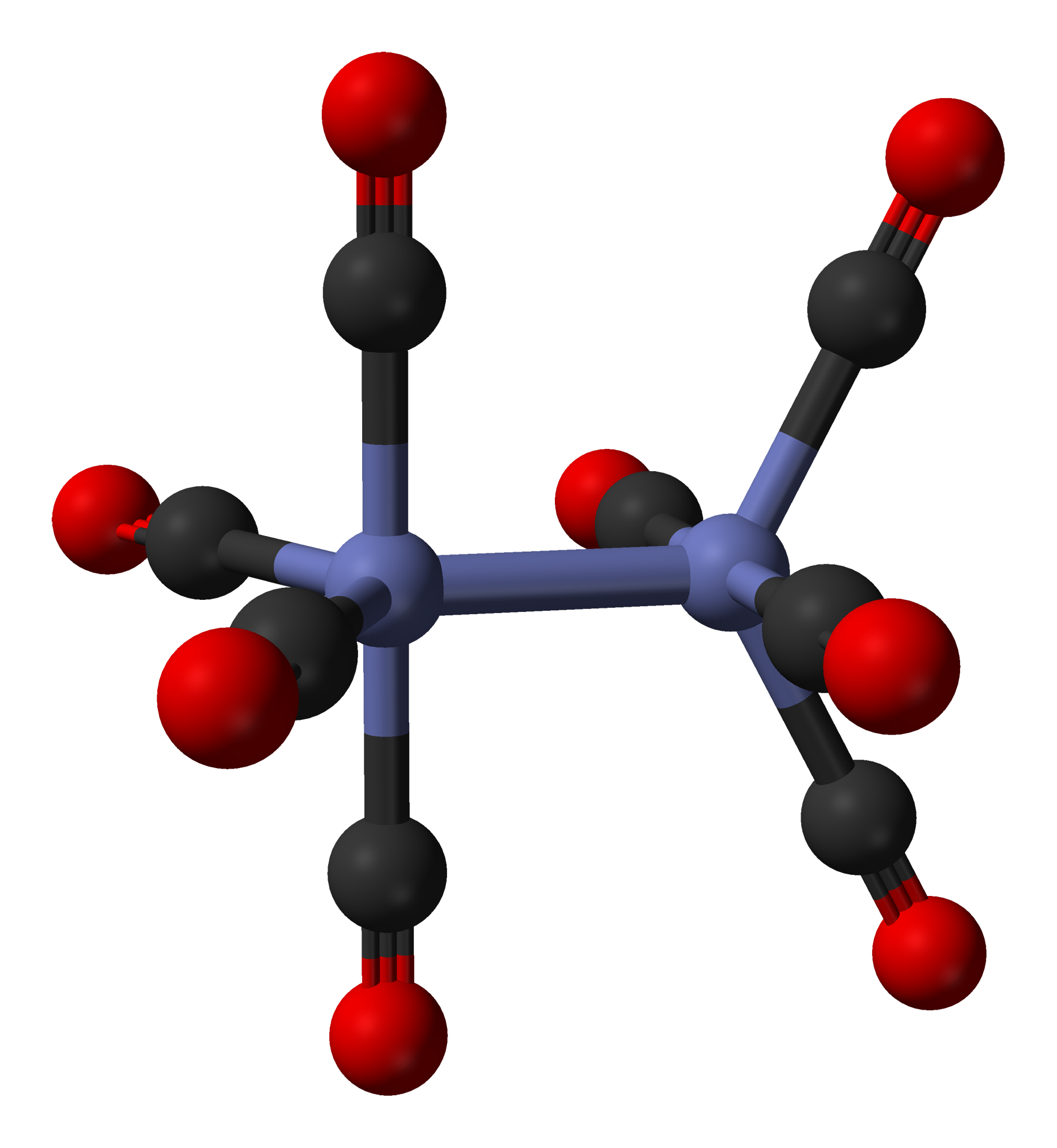
nonbridged D_{2d} isomer

== Reactions ==
=== Reduction ===
Dicobalt octacarbonyl is reductively cleaved by alkali metals and related reagents, such as sodium amalgam. The resulting sodium tetracarbonylcobaltate protonates to give tetracarbonyl cobalt hydride:

Co_{2}(CO)_{8} + 2 Na → 2 Na[Co(CO)_{4}]
Na[Co(CO)_{4}] + H^{+} → H[Co(CO)_{4}] + Na^{+}

Salts of this form are also intermediates in the cyanide synthesis pathway for dicobalt octacarbonyl.

=== Reactions with electrophiles ===
Halogens and related reagents cleave the Co–Co bond to give pentacoordinated halotetracarbonyls:

Co_{2}(CO)_{8} + Br_{2} → 2 Br[Co(CO)_{4}]

Cobalt tricarbonyl nitrosyl is produced by treatment of dicobalt octacarbonyl with nitric oxide:

Co_{2}(CO)_{8} + 2 NO → 2 Co(CO)_{3}NO + 2 CO

=== Reactions with alkynes ===
The Nicholas reaction is a substitution reaction whereby an alkoxy group located on the α-carbon of an alkyne is replaced by another nucleophile. The alkyne reacts first with dicobalt octacarbonyl, from which is generated a stabilized propargylic cation that reacts with the incoming nucleophile and the product then forms by oxidative demetallation.

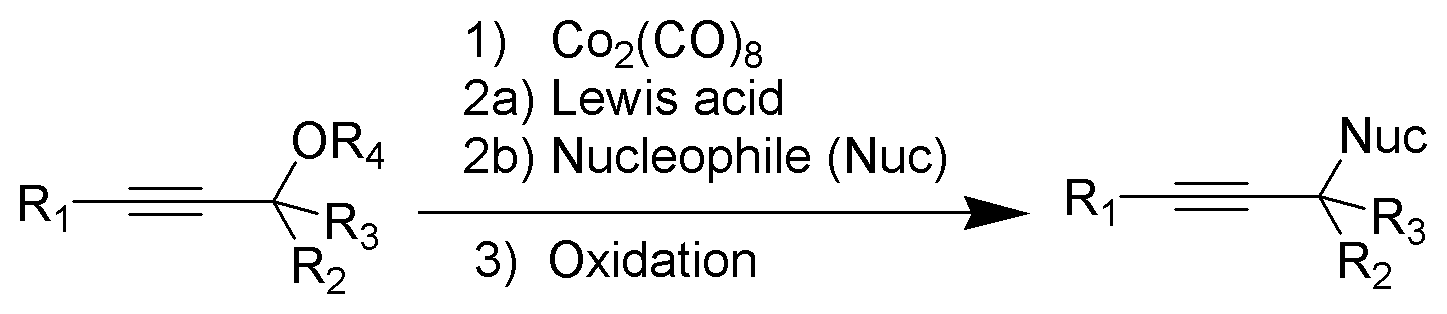
The Nicholas reaction

The Pauson–Khand reaction, in which an alkyne, an alkene, and carbon monoxide cyclize to give a cyclopentenone, can be catalyzed by Co_{2}(CO)_{8}, though newer methods that are more efficient have since been developed:

Co_{2}(CO)_{8} reacts with alkynes to form a stable covalent complex, which is useful as a protective group for the alkyne. This complex itself can also be used in the Pauson–Khand reaction.

Intramolecular Pauson–Khand reactions, where the starting material contains both the alkene and alkyne moieties, are possible. In the asymmetric synthesis of the Lycopodium alkaloid huperzine-Q, Takayama and co-workers used an intramolecular Pauson–Khand reaction to cyclise an enyne containing a tert-butyldiphenylsilyl (TBDPS) protected primary alcohol. The preparation of the cyclic siloxane moiety immediately prior to the introduction of the dicobalt octacarbonyl ensures that the product is formed with the desired conformation.

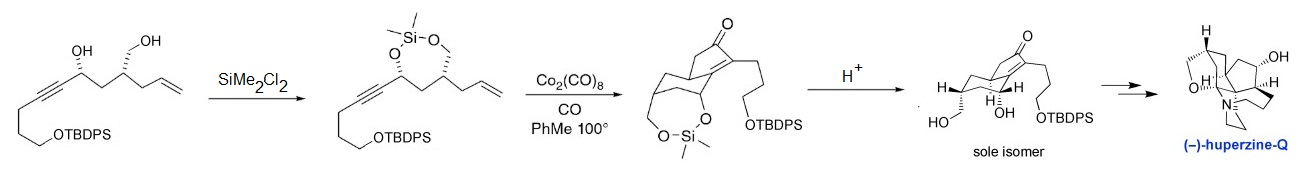

Dicobalt octacarbonyl can catalyze alkyne trimerisation of diphenylacetylene and its derivatives to hexaphenylbenzenes. Symmetrical diphenylacetylenes form 6-substituted hexaphenylbenzenes, while asymmetrical diphenylacetylenes form a mixture of two isomers.

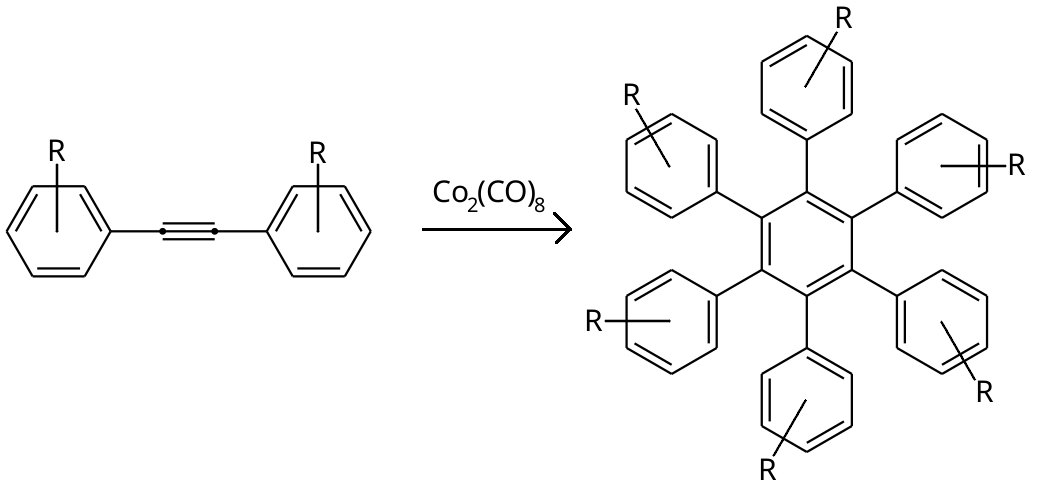
Symmetric diphenylacetylene cyclotrimerization using dicobalt octacarbonyl

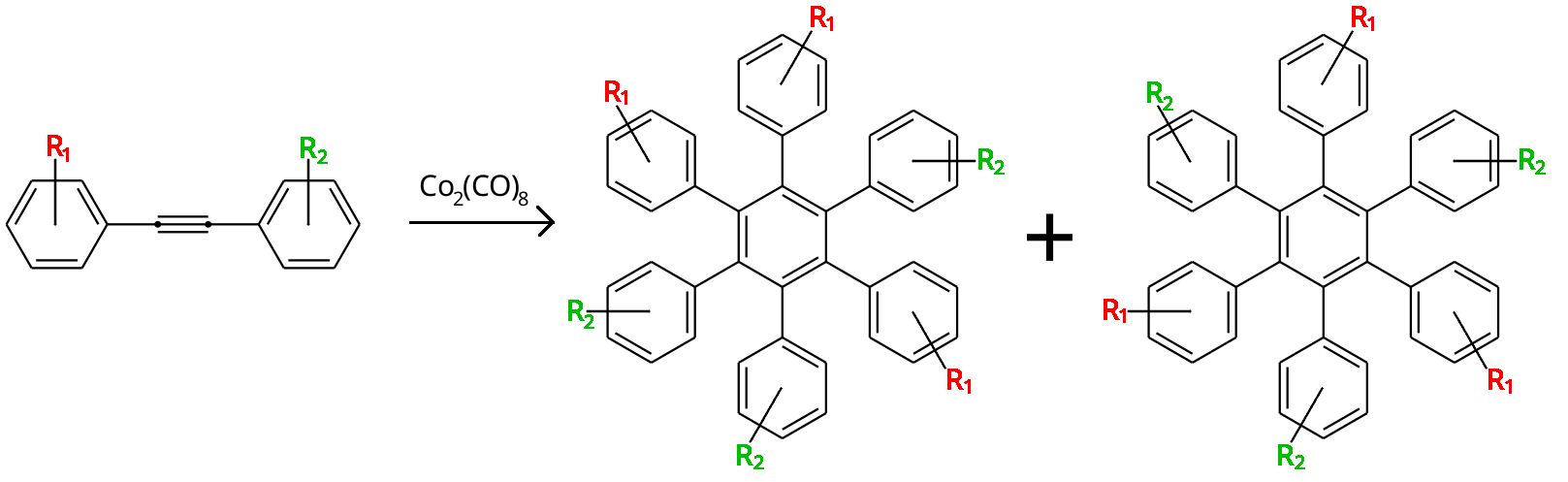
Asymmetric diphenylacetylene cyclotrimerization using dicobalt octacarbonyl

=== Hydroformylation ===
Catalytic cycle for the hydroformylation of a terminal alkene (RCH=CH_{2}) to an aldehyde (RCH_{2}CH_{2}CHO): 1. Carbon monoxide dissociates from cobalt tetracarbonyl hydride to form the active catalyst, HCo(CO)_{3}; 2. The cobalt centre π bonds to the alkene; 3. The alkene ligand inserts into the cobalt–hydride bond; 4. An additional carbonyl ligand coordinates; 5. A carbonyl ligand migrates into the cobalt–alkyl bond; 6. Dihydrogen adds to the acyl complex; 7. The dihidrydo complex eliminates the aldehyde product, regenerating the catalyst; 8. An unproductive and reversible side reaction

Hydrogenation of Co_{2}(CO)_{8} produces cobalt tetracarbonyl hydride H[Co(CO)_{4}]:

Co_{2}(CO)_{8} + H_{2} → 2 H[Co(CO)_{4}]

This hydride is a catalyst for hydroformylation – the conversion of alkenes to aldehydes. The catalytic cycle for this hydroformylation is shown in the diagram.

=== Substitution reactions ===
The CO ligands can be replaced with tertiary phosphine ligands to give Co_{2}(CO)^{−}_{8}_{x}(PR_{3})_{x}. These bulky derivatives are more selective catalysts for hydroformylation reactions. "Hard" Lewis bases, e.g. pyridine, cause disproportionation:

12 C_{5}H_{5}N + 3 Co_{2}(CO)_{8} → 2 [Co(C_{5}H_{5}N)_{6}][Co(CO)_{4}]_{2} + 8 CO

=== Conversion to higher carbonyls ===
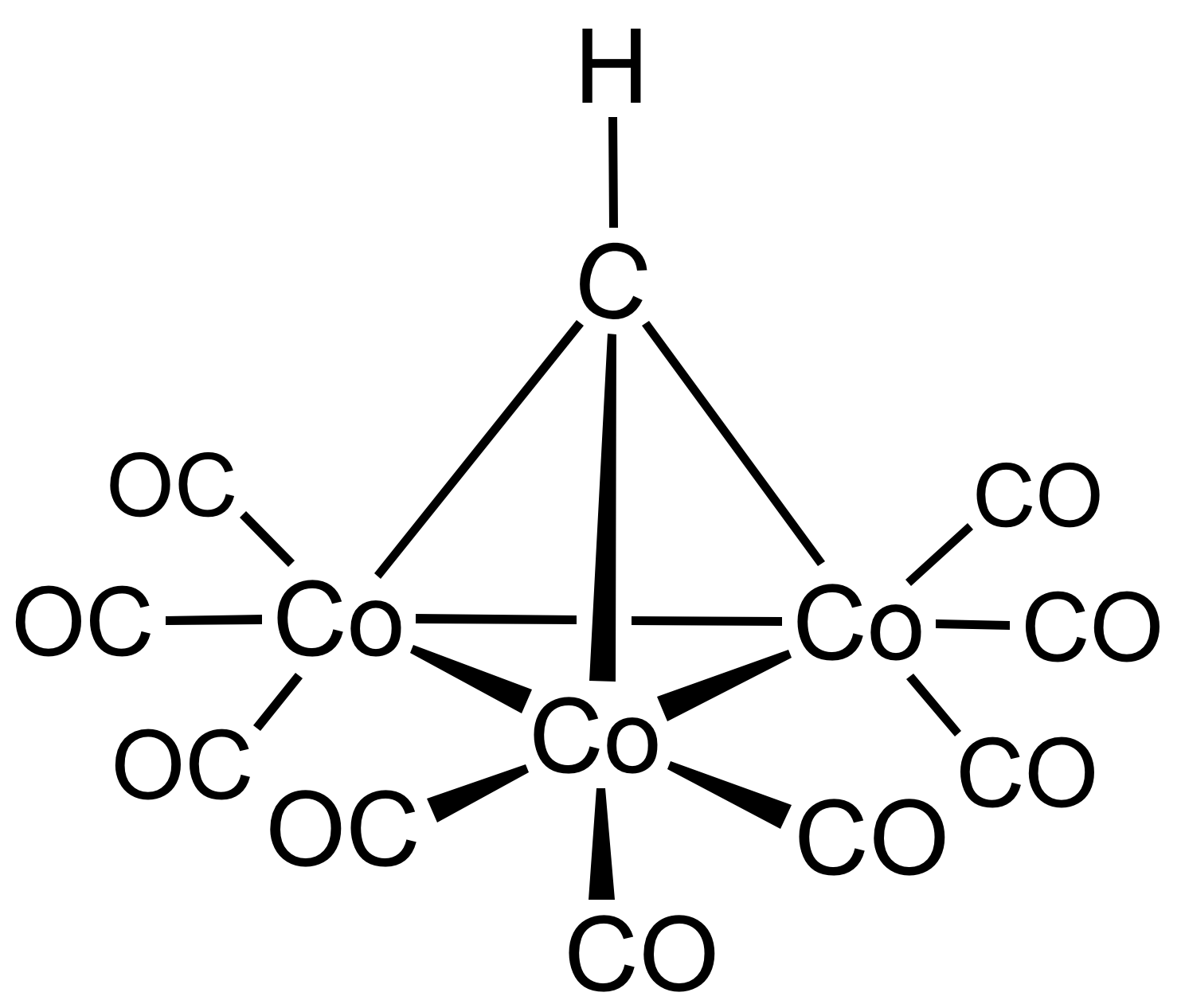
Methylidynetricobaltnonacarbonyl, HCCo_{3}(CO)_{9}, an organocobalt cluster compound structurally related to tetracobalt dodecacarbonyl

Heating causes decarbonylation and formation of tetracobalt dodecacarbonyl:

2 Co_{2}(CO)_{8} → Co_{4}(CO)_{12} + 4 CO

Like many metal carbonyls, dicobalt octacarbonyl abstracts halides from alkyl halides. Upon reaction with bromoform, it converts to methylidynetricobaltnonacarbonyl, HCCo_{3}(CO)_{9}, by a reaction that can be idealised as:

9 Co_{2}(CO)_{8} + 4 CHBr_{3} → 4 HCCo_{3}(CO)_{9} + 36 CO + 6 CoBr_{2}

== Safety ==
Co_{2}(CO)_{8} a volatile source of cobalt(0), is pyrophoric and releases carbon monoxide upon decomposition. The National Institute for Occupational Safety and Health has recommended that workers should not be exposed to concentrations greater than 0.1 mg/m^{3} over an eight-hour time-weighted average, without the proper respiratory gear.
