= Tetramethylthiourea =

Names
- Preferred IUPAC name Tetramethylthiourea

Identifiers
CAS Number	2782-91-4
3D model (JSmol)	Interactive image
ChEMBL	ChEMBL12214
ChemSpider	16753
ECHA InfoCard	100.018.626
EC Number	220-488-0
PubChem CID	17725
UNII	J6T67A1P72
CompTox Dashboard (EPA)	DTXSID5026126
- InChI: InChI=1S/C5H12N2S/c1-6(2)5(8)7(3)4/h1-4H3 Key: MNOILHPDHOHILI-UHFFFAOYSA-N
- SMILES: CN(C)C(=S)N(C)C

Properties
Chemical formula	C_{5}H_{12}N_{2}S
Molar mass	132.23 g·mol^{−1}
Appearance	white solid
Melting point	78 °C (172 °F; 351 K)
Boiling point	245 °C (473 °F; 518 K)
Solubility in water	5,400 mg/l

Hazards
- GHS labelling
Pictograms	(GHS07: Exclamation mark)
Signal word	Warning
Hazard statements	H302
Precautionary statements	P264, P270, P301+P312, P330, P501
- Except where otherwise noted, data are given for materials in their standard state (at 25 °C [77 °F], 100 kPa). Infobox references

Tetramethylthiourea is an organosulfur compound with the formula ((CH_{3})_{2}N)_{2}C=S. This commercially available compound is used as a ligand in homogeneous catalysis and in organic synthesis.

== Structure ==
The core of the compound is thiourea, with each nitrogen connected to two methyl groups. The molecule is planar. The C=S bond is 0.02 Å shorter than in thiourea itself.

== Reactions ==
Sulfur is the nucleophilic site on tetramethylthiourea. Alkylation occurs at sulfur, affording isothiouronium salts.

Tetramethylthiourea forms many coordination complexes with varying molecular geometries. Two examples are the tetrahedral CoCl_{2}L_{2} and the linear AuBrL, where L = ((CH_{3})_{2}N)_{2}C=S.
