= Tetracobalt dodecacarbonyl =

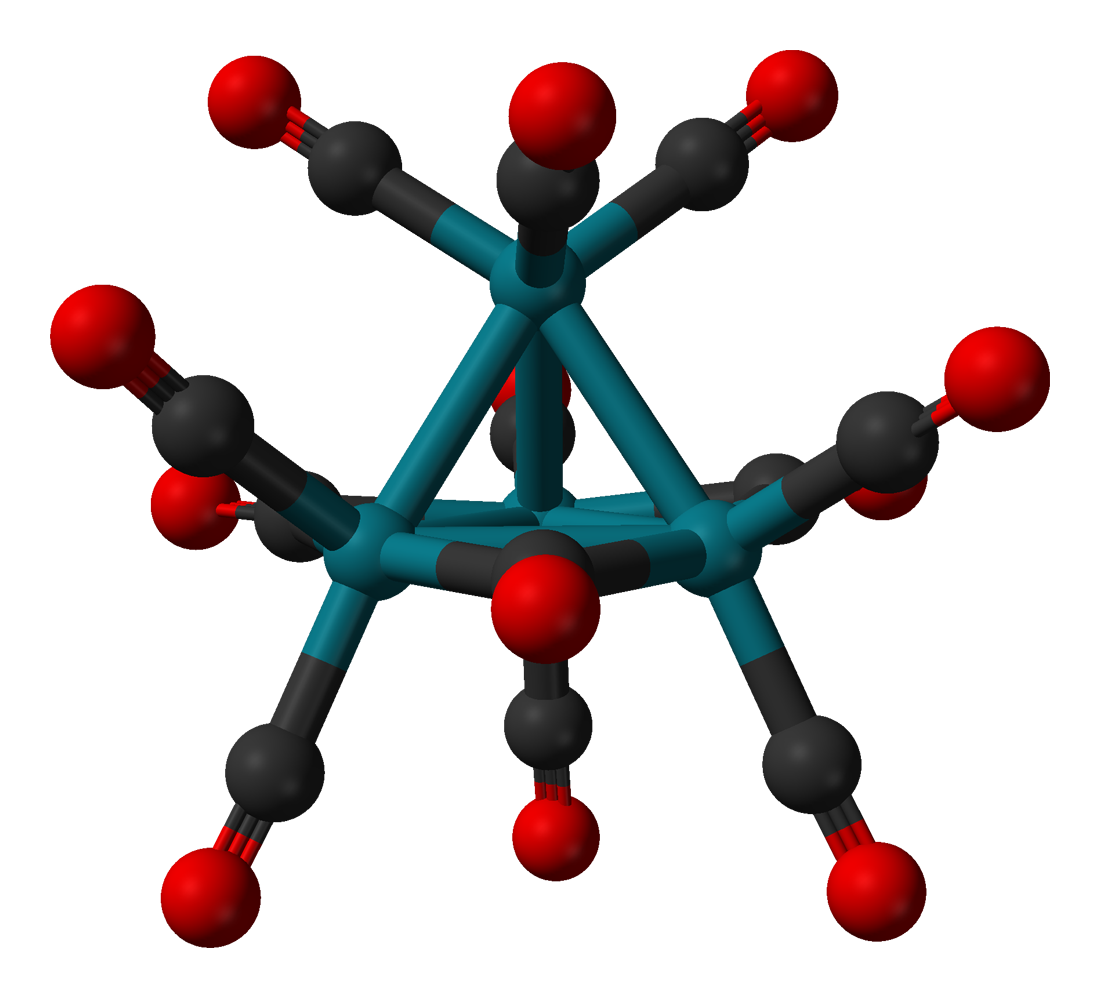

Names
- Other names cobalt dodecacarbonyl, cobalt carbonyl

Identifiers
CAS Number	17786-31-1
3D model (JSmol)	Interactive image
ChemSpider	453122
ECHA InfoCard	100.037.951
EC Number	241-763-1
PubChem CID	519477
CompTox Dashboard (EPA)	DTXSID20939000
- InChI: InChI=1S/12CO.4Co/c12*1-2;;;; Key: YMFAWOSEDSLYSZ-UHFFFAOYSA-N
- SMILES: [Co-2]1235(C#[O+])(C#[O+])C(=O)[Co-2]246(C#[O+])(C#[O+])C(=O)[Co-2]34(C#[O+])(C#[O+])(C1=O)[Co-3]56(C#[O+])(C#[O+])C#[O+]

Properties
Chemical formula	Co_{4}(CO)_{12}
Molar mass	571.858 g/mol
Appearance	black crystal
Density	2.09 g/cm^{3}
Melting point	decomposes at 60 °C (140 °F; 333 K)

Hazards
- GHS labelling
Pictograms	(GHS02: Flammable) (GHS08: Health hazard) (GHS09: Environmental hazard)
Signal word	Warning
Hazard statements	H228, H301, H317, H331, H351
- Except where otherwise noted, data are given for materials in their standard state (at 25 °C [77 °F], 100 kPa). Infobox references

Tetracobalt dodecacarbonyl is the chemical compound with the formula Co_{4}(CO)_{12}. It is a black crystalline compound that is insoluble in water and easily oxidized by air. It is an example of a metal carbonyl cluster.

== Synthesis and structure ==
This compound is synthesized by decarbonylation of Co_{2}(CO)_{8}.

2 Co_{2}(CO)_{8} → Co_{4}(CO)_{12} + 4 CO

The molecule consists of a tetrahedral Co_{4} core, but the molecular symmetry is C_{3v}. Three carbonyl ligands are bridging ligands and nine are terminal. The average Co-Co distance is 2.499 Å, the average C-O bond length is 1.133 Å, and the average Co-C-O angle is 177.5°.

Rh_{4}(CO)_{12} adopts the same C_{3v} structure but Ir_{4}(CO)_{12} has perfect T_{d} symmetry with no bridging CO ligands groups. The Rh_{4} and Ir_{4} clusters are more thermally robust than that of the Co_{4} compound, reflecting the usual trend in the strengths of metal-metal bond for second and third row metals vs those for the first row metals. There has been disagreement between the theoretically predicted and experimental structure of tetracobalt dodecacarbonyl.
