= Methylidynetricobaltnonacarbonyl =

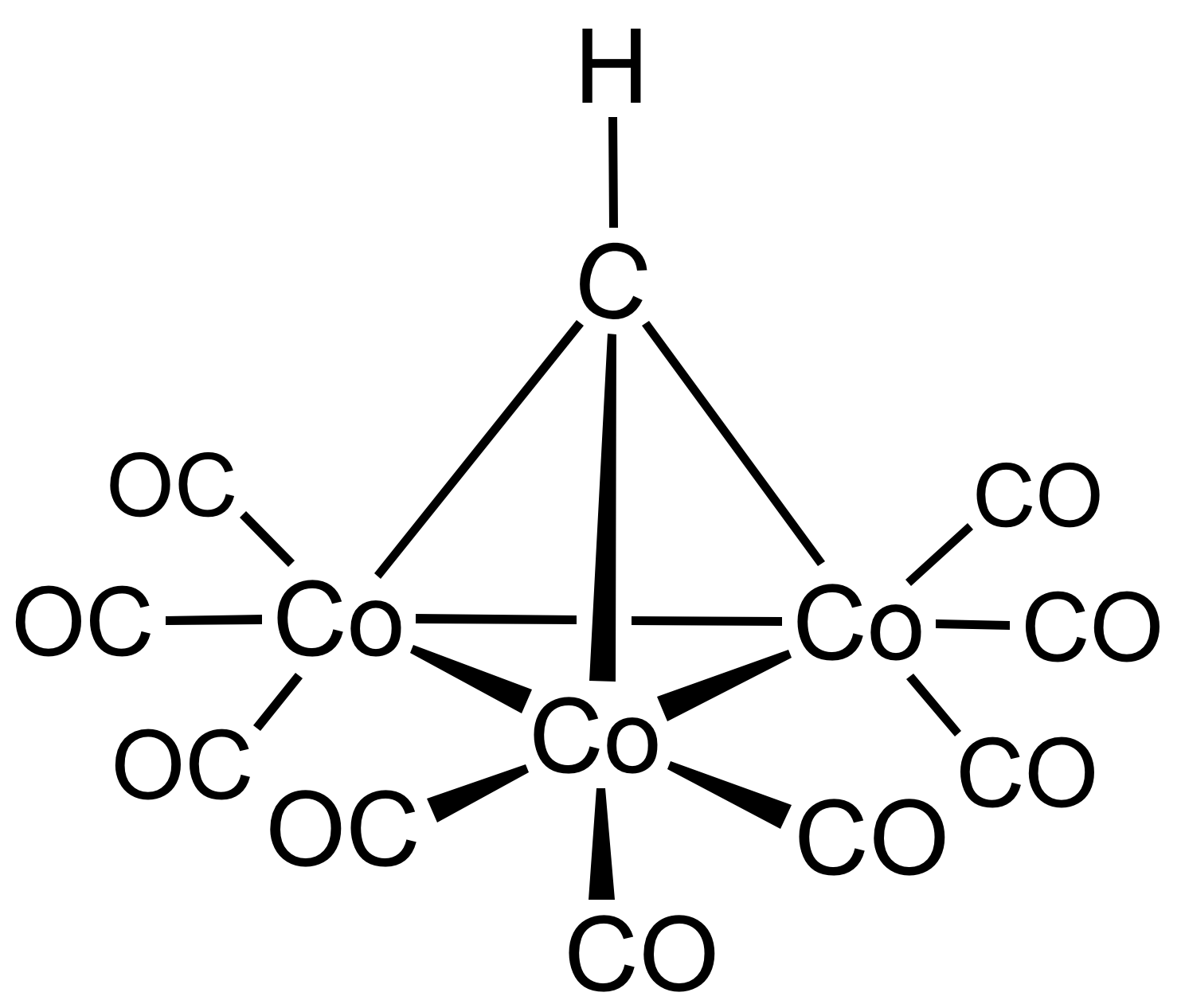

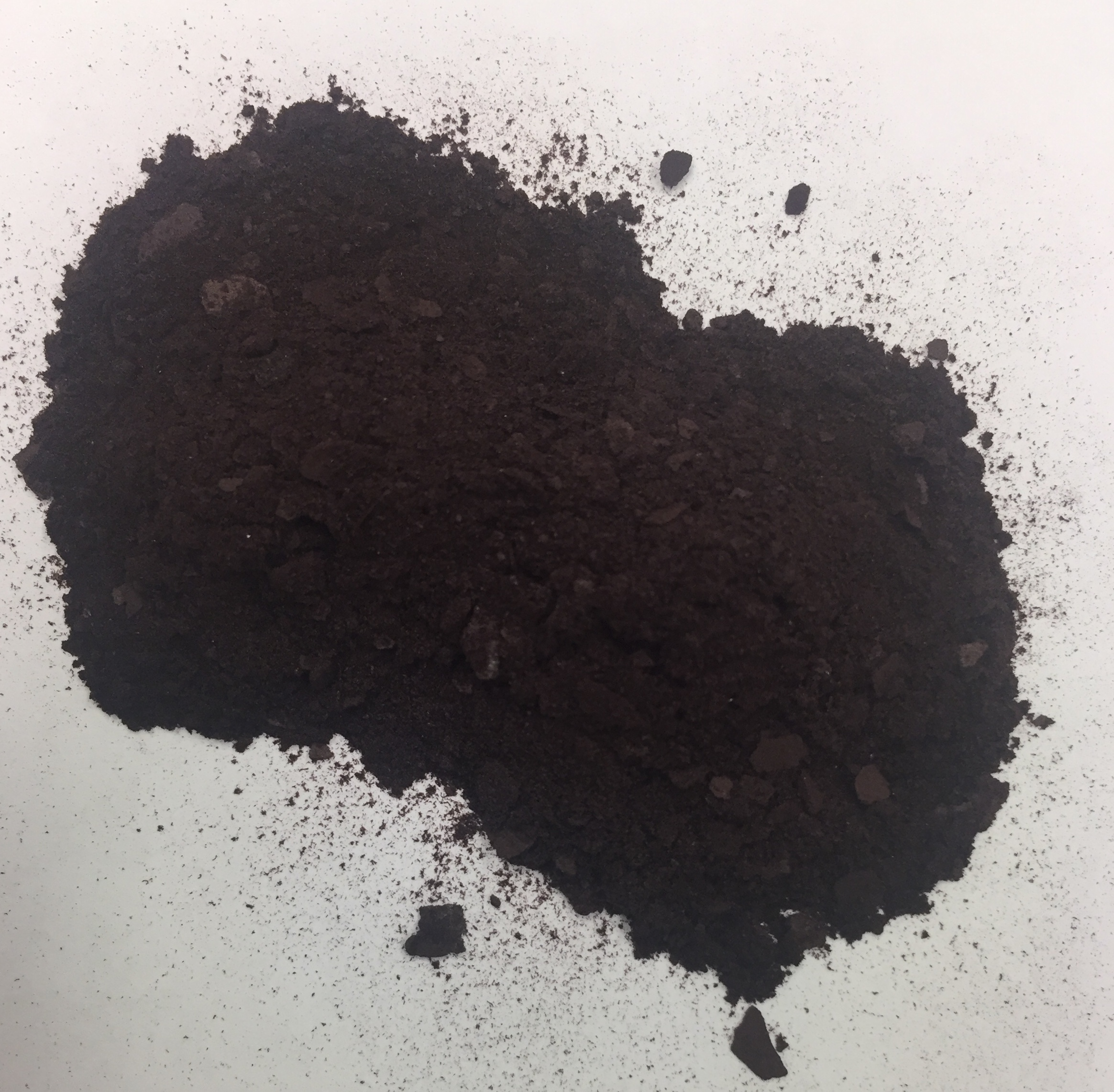

Names
- Other names methylidyne-tris(tricarbonylcobalt)

Identifiers
CAS Number	15664-75-2
3D model (JSmol)	Interactive image
PubChem CID	519159 wrong formula
- InChI: InChI=1S/9CO.CH.3Co/c9*1-2;;;;/h;;;;;;;;;1H;;;/q9*+1;;3*-3 Key: WPOHNFRRRVAWSE-UHFFFAOYSA-N
- SMILES: [O+]#C[Co-3]12(C#[O+])(C#[O+])[Co-3]3(C#[O+])(C#[O+])(C#[O+])[Co-3]1(C#[O+])(C#[O+])(C#[O+])C23

Properties
Chemical formula	C_{10}HCo_{3}O_{9}
Molar mass	441.909 g·mol^{−1}
Appearance	purple solid
Density	2.01 g/cm^{3}
Melting point	105–107 °C (221–225 °F; 378–380 K)
- Except where otherwise noted, data are given for materials in their standard state (at 25 °C [77 °F], 100 kPa). Infobox references

Methylidynetricobaltnonacarbonyl is an organometallic cobalt cluster with the chemical formula Co_{3}(CO)_{9}CH that contains a metal carbonyl core with the methylidyne ligand, first discovered in the late 1950s. A variety of substituents can be added to the methylidyne group to form derivatives of the parent compound that have unique spectroscopic properties and reactivity.

== Synthesis ==
Methylidynetricobaltnonacarbonyl and derivatives were discovered in the late 1950s by Markby and Wender by reactions of the alkyne complexes Co_{2}(CO)_{6}(R_{2}C_{2}) with acids. The structure of the cluster was however misformulated. In 1962, the class of compounds were properly formulated methylidynetricobaltnonacarbonyl as well as several derivatives.

The synthetic procedure developed by Bor and coworkers relied on the reaction of [Co(CO)_{4}]^{−} anion with chloroform, bromoform, or iodoform in a solution of acetone or THF. Dark violet crystals were obtained in ~20% yield with chloroform, ~18% yield with bromoform, and ~1-2% yield with iodoform. The chloride derivative Co_{3}(CO)_{9}CCl was obtained with CCl_{4} and was isolated as shiny, lilac crystals. Several other functional groups could be installed, including C_{6}H_{5} and CO_{2}CH_{3}, all of which afforded dark violet crystals. Solutions of these compounds are air stable in organic solvents. Treatment of the parent compound with 100 atm CO at 160 °C resulted in the destruction of the complex and the formation of dicobaltoctacarbonyl.

3NaCo(CO)_{4} + CHCl_{3} → HC[Co(CO)_{3}]_{3} + 3 NaCl

== Structure and Bonding ==
The Co-Co bond lengths are ~2.47 Å and the Co-C bond distances are ~1.88 Å. These bond lengths do not change significantly depending on the substituent on the carbon group. The Co-C-Co angle is approximately 80°, indicating a significant bending of the carbon tetrahedral structure, and the ligands are arranged to provide maximum cobalt-carbon interaction. The IR spectra show four absorption bands of varying intensities in the region of terminal C-O groups between 2111 and 2018 cm-1. The ^{13}C NMR spectra have also been analyzed. The mass spectra demonstrate parent molecular ions (Co_{3}(CO)_{9}CH ^{.+}) in good abundance, which demonstrates the high stability of the Co_{3}(CO)_{9} clusters towards oxidation. Initial loss of CO, which is characteristic of most metal-carbonyls, though rupture of the metal-metal bond also often occurs.

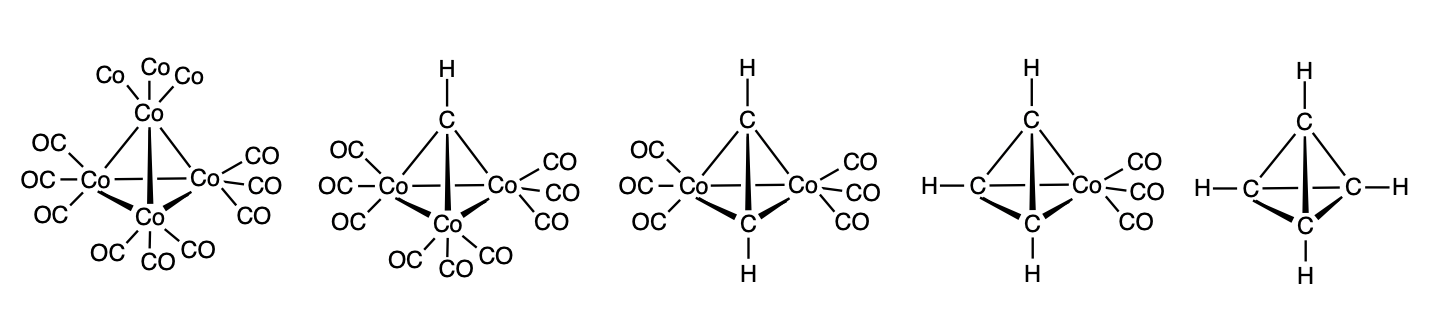
Series of mixed organic and inorganic tetrahedrane structures illustrating that Co(CO)_{3} and methylidyne are isolobal.

The carbonium ion had the correct symmetry to accept electron density from the apex carbon via s-p stabilization. They explained that apex carbon stabilize the carbonium ion via s-p conjugation.

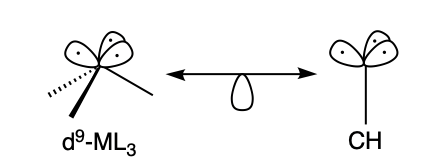
Visual representation of methylidynetricobaltnonacarbonyl isolobal analogy with the CH fragment

== Reactivity ==
^{14}CO labeling studies on the kinetics have been reported. The group concluded the exchange rate of the carbonyl ligands decreases according to the order F > Cl > Br > H, which they attributed to the electronegativity of the atom bound to the methylidyne carbon. Additionally, they demonstrated that the nine carbonyl groups are not kinetically equivalent, and that only 3 CO groups exchange within the 35–55 °C temperature range studied, which agrees with the calculated frontier molecular orbitals discussed above. In the case with the COOCH_{3} group, the exchange occurs for only one CO group which they attributed to the more electron deficient nature of the complex.

Methylidynetricobaltnonacarbonyls reacts with variety of organomercury compounds of the R_{2}Hg and RHgX type; the side product Hg[Co(CO)_{4}]_{2} was formed.

Azobisisobutryonitrile (AIBN), a reagent for the initiation of radical reactions, to a solution of Co_{3}(CO)_{9}CH and allyl acetate afforded a red crystalline solid that they believed formed via a radical mechanism. The radical reactivity of Co_{3}(CO)_{9}CX varies with X. The order of initiator activity was found to be X = Cl > H > Br > Ph > F > i-Pr > C_{2}F_{5}, which aligns with the trend seen for CO ligand exchange studies. These cobalt carbonyl clusters undergo reversible, one-electron reduction in the range of -0.7 to -0.9V versus the saturated calomel electrode.

Methylidynetricobaltnonacarbonyl catalyzes the Pauson-Khand reaction, a [2+2+1] cycloaddition. Methylidynetricobaltnonacarbonyl is more air-stable than the parent dicobalt octacarbonyl, making it a more attractive catalyst. The clusters demonstrated no need for additives such as trimethylphosphite, as is necessary with the dicobalt octacarbonyl, and the best results were obtained with the parent methylidyne cluster.

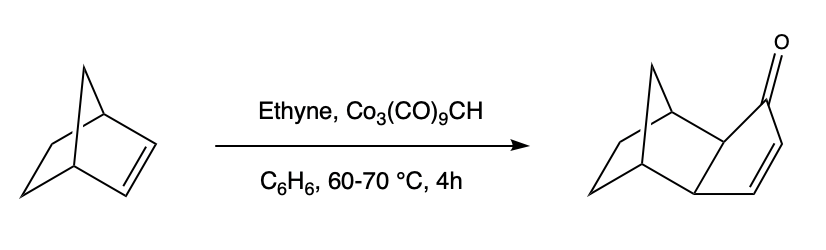
Pauson-Khand reaction using methlylidynetricobaltnonacarbonyl as a catalyst

Methylidynetricobaltnonacarbonyl derivatives are precatalysts for the asymmetric intramolecular Pauson-Khand reaction. The chiral diphosphine Josiphos provides the asymmetry. Despite the unique approach, the clusters are inferior compared to other metal clusters with NORPHOS or Me-DuPHOS ligands, which gave higher yields and fewer side products.
