= Fluoromethylidynium =

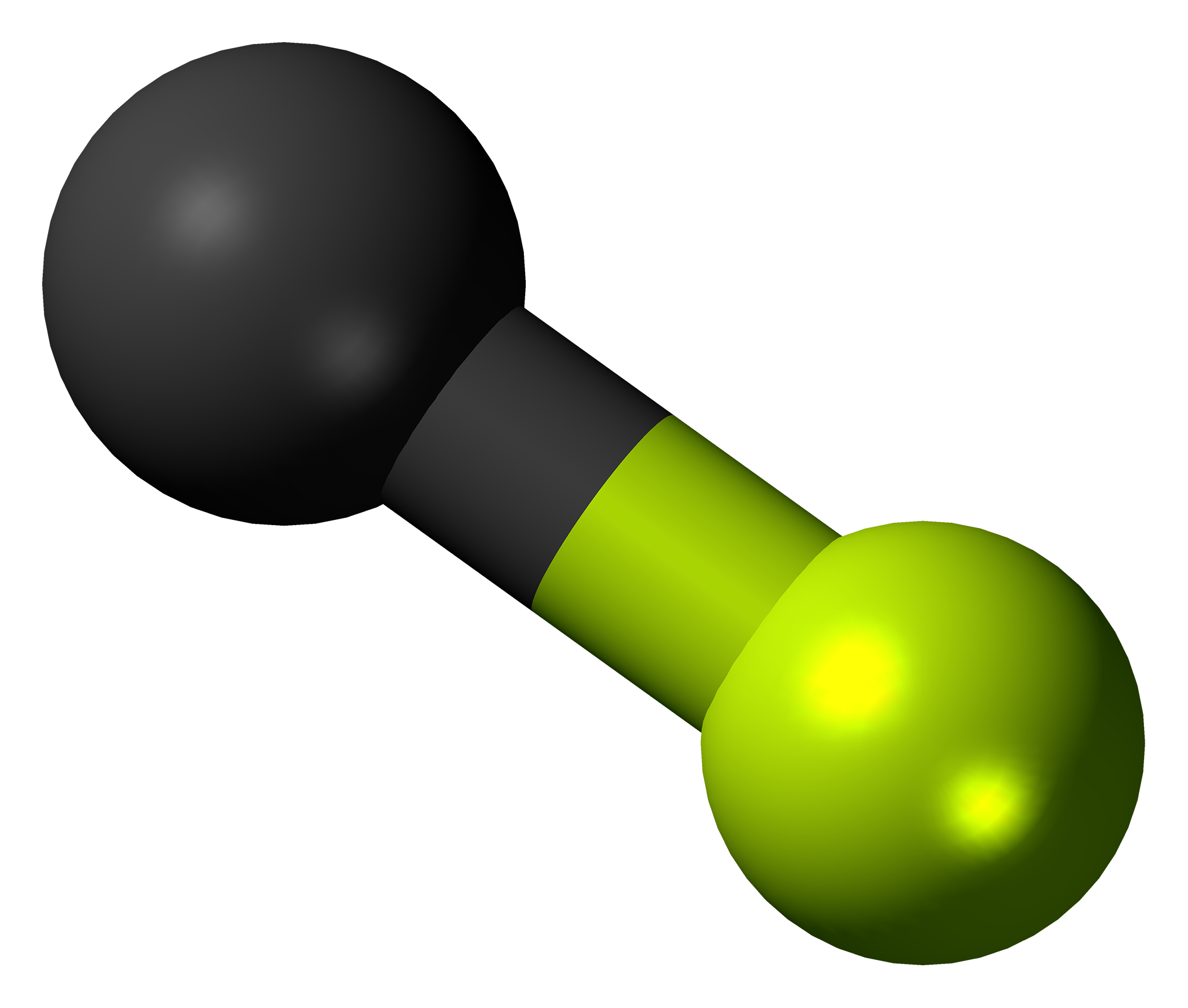

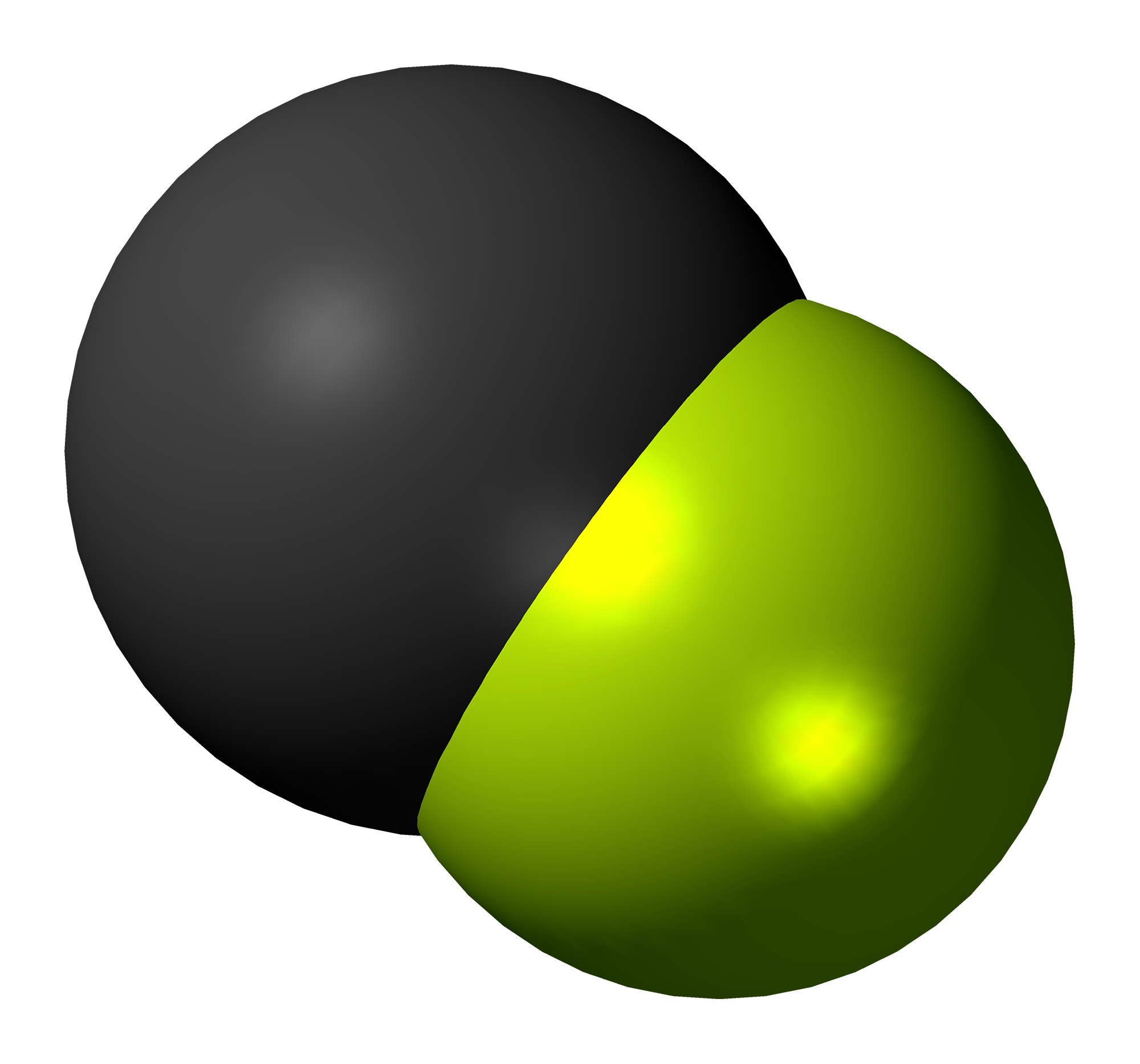

Identifiers
CAS Number	33412-11-2
3D model (JSmol)	Interactive image
- InChI: InChI=1S/CF/c1-2/q+1 Key: LDIFHDJQDDMHHQ-UHFFFAOYSA-N
- SMILES: [C+]F

Properties
Chemical formula	CF^{+}
Molar mass	31.009 g·mol^{−1}

Related compounds
Other cations	Methylidynium CH^{+}
Related compounds	Fluoromethylidyne CF
- Except where otherwise noted, data are given for materials in their standard state (at 25 °C [77 °F], 100 kPa). Infobox references

Fluoromethylidynium or carbon monofluoride cation is a cation with molecular formula CF^{+}. It has gained prominence due to its discovery in space.

== Natural occurrence ==
Fluoromethylidynium was discovered in the Orion Bar. Here the surface density of CF^{+} molecules is over 10^{12} cm^{−2} over a space of a square minute of arc. The IRAM 30 m and APEX 12 m telescopes were used. In the Horsehead Nebula photo-dissociation region the density was observed to be 1.5-2.0 × 10^{12} cm^{−2}. In molecular clouds CF^{+} contains about 1% of the fluorine, with the rest being in HF molecules. CF^{+} has been detected in the N113 star forming region of the Large Magellanic Cloud.

Absorption lines for CF^{+} have been observed in the direction of BL Lacertae, 3C 111 and Westerhout 49, where the Milky Way interstellar medium is backlit by sources bright in the millimeter wave range. CF^{+} has been detected in a collapsing protostar envelope.

== Production ==
The hypothesised method of formation of CF^{+} in gas clouds in space is by a reaction of the carbon anion with hydrogen fluoride.

C^{+} + HF → H^{•} + CF^{+}

C^{+} forms on the edge of a nebula, where ultraviolet rays can ionise carbon. HF forms in a reaction with atomic fluorine with molecular hydrogen H_{2}. In the laboratory, CF^{+} can be made by an electric discharge in hexafluoroethane diluted with helium.

== Properties ==
Table of rotational lines
transition	frequency GHz	strength
J=1-0	102.58748	
J=2-1	205.17445	
J=3-2	307.74438	

The singlet ground state is designated: X^{1}Σ^{+} and the first electronically triplet excited state is: a^{3}Π. The internuclear distance in the ground state is 1.159 Å. Molecular parameters measured from the spectrum are: ω_{e} = 1792.665 cm^{−1}, B_{e} = 1.720417 cm^{−1}, Y_{20}, = −13.2297 cm^{−1}, and D_{0} = 6209 cm^{−1}. CF^{+} is isoelectronic with BF, CO and CN^{−}.

Most of the charge on CF^{+} is concentrated on the carbon atom. Calculations show +0.90116 on carbon and +0.09884 on fluorine.

== Reactions ==
CF^{+} binds helium atoms weakly. Computational studies suggest the helium atom is bound roughly perpendicularly to the C-F bond, angled towards the carbon atom at 99.4° from the centre of mass at a position of 5.17 bohr. The binding energy is calculated to be –212.192 cm^{−1} (26.3 meV, 2.5383798 kJ/mol).

In dissociative recombination an electron combines and the molecule breaks up.

CF^{+} + e^{−} → C + F^{•}
