= Transition metal carbene complex =

Class of organometalic compounds

A transition metal carbene complex is an organometallic compound featuring a divalent carbon ligand, itself also called a carbene. Carbene complexes have been synthesized from most transition metals and f-block metals, using many different synthetic routes such as nucleophilic addition and alpha-hydrogen abstraction. The term carbene ligand is a formalism since many are not directly derived from carbenes and most are much less reactive than lone carbenes. Described often as =CR_{2}, carbene ligands are intermediate between alkyls (−CR_{3}) and carbynes (≡CR). Many different carbene-based reagents such as Tebbe's reagent are used in synthesis. They also feature in catalytic reactions, especially alkene metathesis, and are of value in both industrial heterogeneous and in homogeneous catalysis for laboratory- and industrial-scale preparation of fine chemicals.

== Classification ==
Metal carbene complexes are often classified into two types. The Fischer carbenes, named after Ernst Otto Fischer, feature strong π-acceptors at the metal and are electrophilic at the carbene carbon atom. Schrock carbenes, named after Richard R. Schrock, are characterized by more nucleophilic carbene carbon centers; these species typically feature higher oxidation state (valency) metals. N-Heterocyclic carbenes (NHCs) were popularized following Arduengo's isolation of a stable free carbene in 1991. Reflecting the growth of the area, carbene complexes are now known with a broad range of different reactivities and diverse substituents. Often it is not possible to classify a carbene complex solely with regards to its electrophilicity or nucleophilicity.

=== Fischer carbenes ===
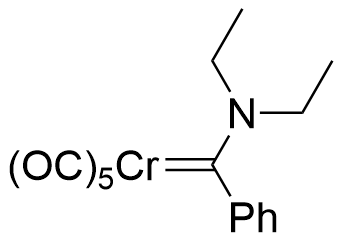
Example Fischer carbene with chromium(0) centre and diethylamine donor.

The common features of Fischer carbenes are:

- low oxidation state metal center
- middle and late transition metals Fe(0), Mo(0), Cr(0)
- π-acceptor metal ligands
- π-donor substituents on the carbene atom such as alkoxy and alkylated amino groups.

Examples include (CO)_{5}W=COMePh and (OC)_{5}Cr=C(NR_{2})Ph.

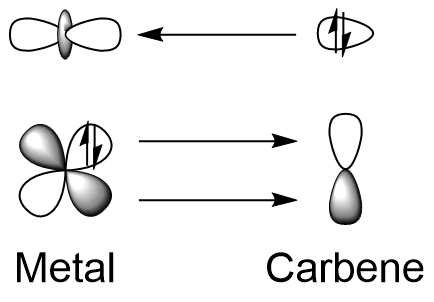
Orbital interaction in a Fischer carbene. The carbene electrons are donated to a sigma bond, and weak pi-backbonding occurs.

Fischer carbene complexes are related to the singlet form of carbenes, where both electrons occupy the same sp^{2} orbital at the carbon. This lone pair donates to a metal-based empty d orbital, forming a σ bond. π-backbonding from a filled metal d orbital to the empty p orbital of the carbon atom is possible. However this interaction is generally weak since the alpha donor atoms also donate to this orbital. As such, Fischer carbenes are characterized as having partial double bond character. The major resonance structures of Fischer carbenes put the negative charge on the metal centre, and the positive on the carbon atom, making it electrophilic.

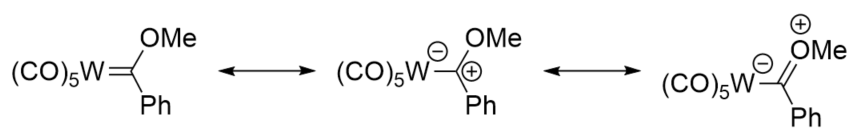
Major resonance structures of (CO)_{5}W=COMePh. Structures with a positive charge on carbon are significant and make the carbon electrophilic.

Fischer carbenes can be likened to ketones, with the carbene carbon atom being electrophilic, like the carbonyl carbon atom of a ketone. This can be seen from the resonance structures, where there is a significant contribution from the structure bearing a positive carbon centre. Like ketones, Fischer carbene species can undergo aldol-like reactions. The hydrogen atoms attached to the carbon atom α to the carbene carbon atom are acidic, and can be deprotonated by a base such as n-butyllithium, to give a nucleophile, which can undergo further reaction.

=== Schrock carbenes ===
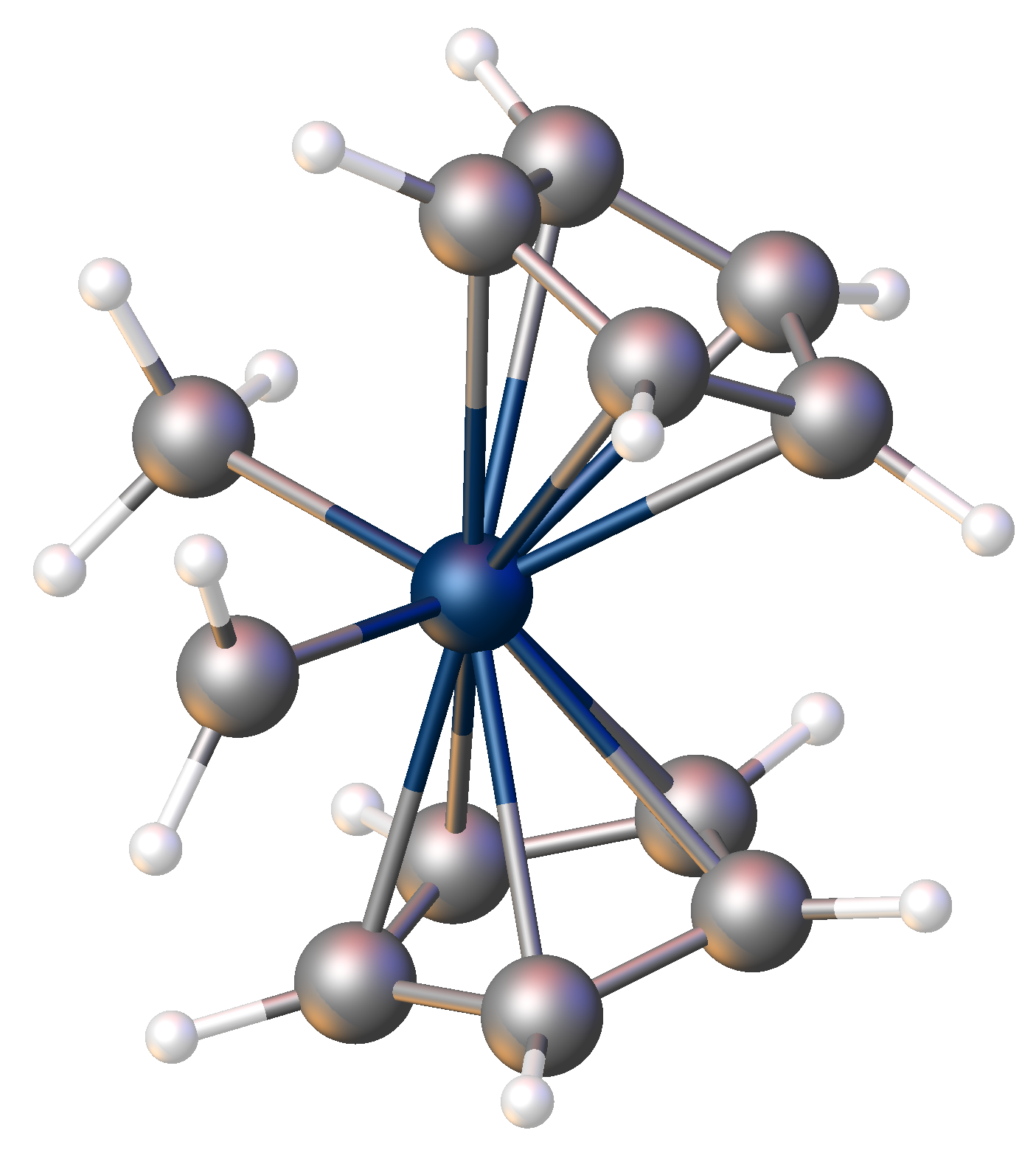
Structure of (C_{5}H_{5})_{2}TaCH_{3}(CH_{2}), as determined by X-ray crystallography. The Ta−CH_{3} and Ta=CH_{2} distances are 2.37 and 2.04 Å, respectively. Color code: blue = Ta, gray = C, white = H.

Schrock carbenes do not have π-accepting ligands on the metal centre. They are often called alkylidene complexes. Typically this subset of carbene complexes are found with:

- high oxidation state metal center
- early transition metals Ti(IV), Ta(V)
- σ-donor and sometimes π-donor metal ligands
- hydrogen and alkyl substituents on carbenoid carbon.

Examples include ((CH_{3})_{3}CCH_{2})Ta=CHC(CH_{3})_{3} and Os(PPh_{3})_{2}(NO)Cl(=CH_{2}).

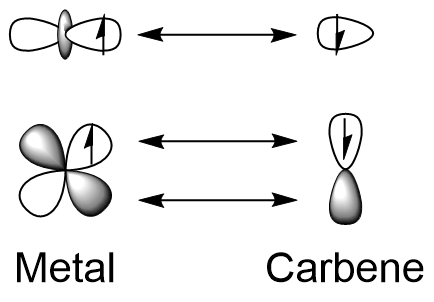
Orbital interaction in the bonding of a Schrock carbene. Both the metal and carbon provide 2 unpaired electron each, forming the double bond.

Bonding in such complexes can be viewed as the coupling of a triplet state metal and triplet carbene, forming a true double bond. Both the metal and carbon atom donate 2 electrons, one to each bond. Since there is no donation to the carbene atom from adjacent groups, the extent of pi backbonding is much greater, giving a strong double bond. These bonds are weakly polarized towards carbon and therefore the carbene atom is a nucleophile. Furthermore, the major resonance structures of Schrock carbene put the negative charge on the carbon atom, making it nucleophilic. Complexes with the methylidene ligand (=CH_{2}) are the simplest Schrock-type carbenes.

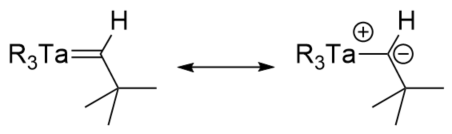
Major resonance structures of a Schrock carbene. The negative charge at the carbon atom renders it nucleophilic.

=== N-Heterocyclic carbenes ===
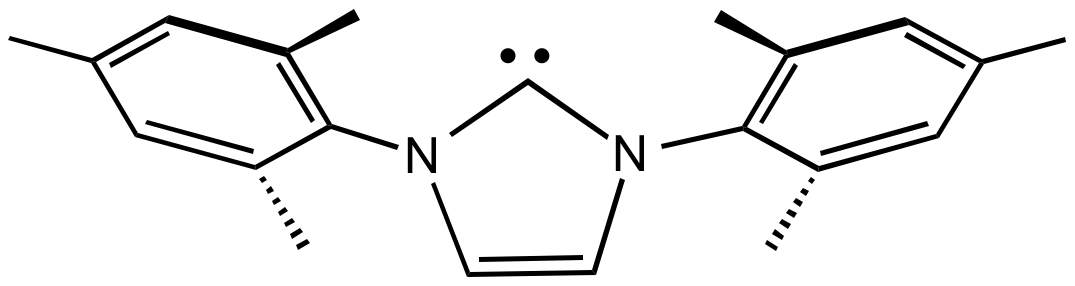
IMes is a common NHC ligand.

N-Heterocyclic carbenes (NHCs) are particularly common carbene ligands. They are popular because they are more readily prepared than Schrock and Fischer carbenes. In fact, many NHCs are isolated as the free ligand, since they are persistent carbenes. Being strongly stabilized by π-donating substituents, NHCs are powerful σ-donors but π-bonding with the metal is weak. For this reason, the bond between the carbon and the metal center is often represented by a single dative bond, whereas Fischer and Schrock carbenes are usually depicted with double bonds to metal. Continuing with this analogy, NHCs are often compared with trialkylphosphine ligands. Like phosphines, NHCs serve as spectator ligands that influence catalysis through a combination of electronic and steric effects, but they do not directly bind substrates.

=== Bimetallic carbene complexes ===
An early example of this bonding mode was provided by [C_{5}Me_{5}Mn(CO)_{2}]_{2}(μ−CO) prepared from diazomethane:

2 C_{5}Me_{5}Mn(CO)_{2}(thf) + CH_{2}N_{2} → [C_{5}Me_{5}Mn(CO)_{2}]_{2}(μ−CH_{2}] + N_{2} + 2 thf

Another example of this family of compounds is Tebbe's reagent. It features a methylene bridge joining titanium and aluminum.

== Application of Metal Carbenes ==
Metal carbene complexes have applications in hetereogeneous and homogeneous catalysis, and as reagents for organic reactions.

=== Catalysis ===
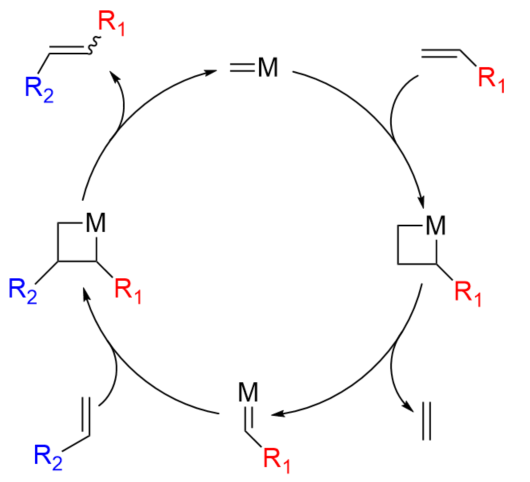
Catalytic cycle of olefin metathesis. The metal complex alternated between a metallocyclobutane ring and carbene complex, catalyzing the formation of new carbon-carbon double bonds.

The dominant application of metal carbenes involves none of the above classes of compounds, but rather heterogeneous catalysts used for alkene metathesis for the synthesis of higher alkenes. A variety of related reactions are used to interconvert light alkenes, e.g. butenes, propylene, and ethylene. Carbene complexes are invoked as intermediates in the Fischer–Tropsch route to hydrocarbons.

A variety of homogeneous carbene catalysts, especially the Grubbs' ruthenium and Schrock molybdenum-imido catalysts have been used for olefin metathesis in laboratory-scale synthesis of natural products and materials science.

=== Stoichiometric reactions ===
Homogeneous Schrock-type carbene complexes such as Tebbe's reagent can be used for the olefination of carbonyls, replacing the oxygen atom with a methylidene group. The nucleophilic carbon atom behaves similarly to the carbon atom of the phosphorus ylide in the Wittig reaction, attacking the electrophilic carbonyl atom of a ketone, followed by elimination of a metal oxide.

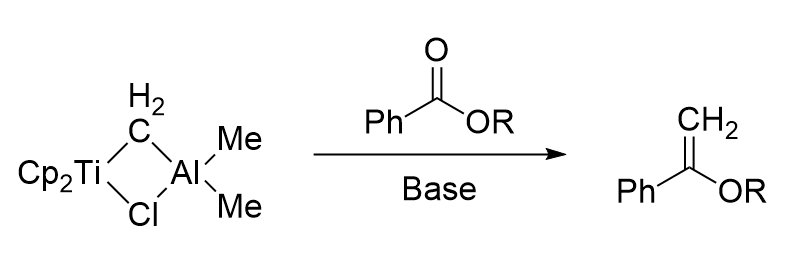
Olefination of an ester using Tebbe's reagent as a methylidene source.

In the nucleophilic abstraction reaction, a methyl group can be abstracted from the donating group of a Fischer carbene, making it a strong nucleophile for further reaction.

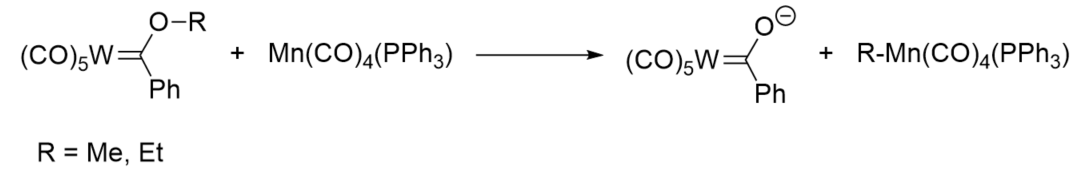
Nucleophilic abstraction of the methyl group of a Fischer carbene. The negatively charge oxygen is a nucleophile which can undergo further reaction.

Diazo compounds like methyl phenyldiazoacetate can be used for cyclopropanation or to insert into C-H bonds of organic substrates. These reactions are catalyzed by dirhodium tetraacetate or related chiral derivatives. Such catalysis is assumed to proceed via the intermediacy of carbene complexes.

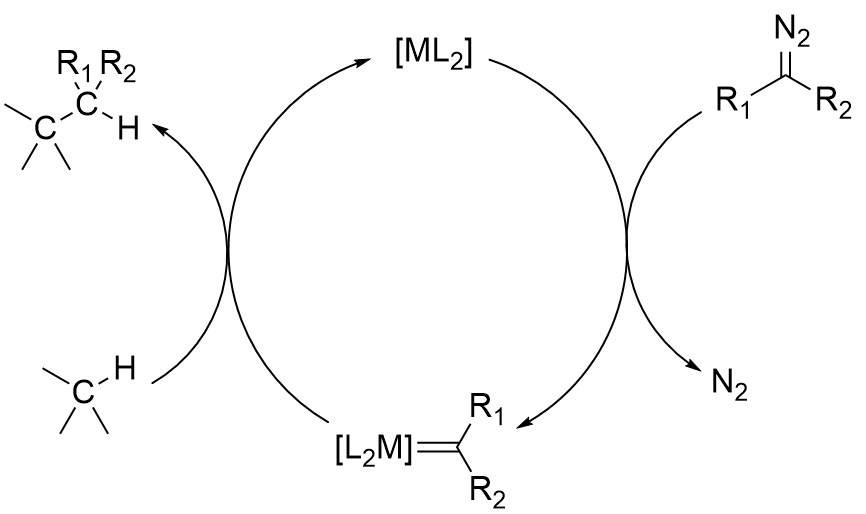
Catalytic cycle for the insertion of carbenes into carbon-hydrogen bonds. The metal carbene is generated by nitrogen elimination from the diazo compound, and then inserts into the C-H bond.

==== Wulff-Dötz Reaction ====
Fischer carbenes are used with alkynes as the starting reagents for the Wulff–Dötz reaction, forming phenols.

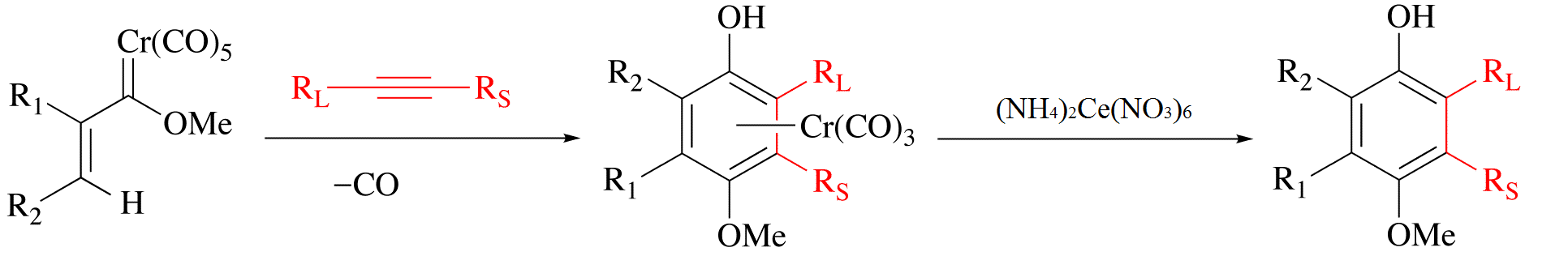
General reaction scheme for the Wullf-Dötz reaction, making phenols from Fischer carbene complexes and alkynes.

== History ==
The first metal carbene complex, Chugaev's red salt, was not recognized as such until decades after its preparation.

The first metal carbene complex to have been reported was Chugaev's red salt, first synthesized as early as 1925, although it was never identified to be a carbene complex. The characterization of (CO)5W(COCH3(Ph)) in the 1960s is often cited as the starting point of the area and Ernst Otto Fischer, for this and other achievements in organometallic chemistry, was awarded the 1973 Nobel Prize in Chemistry. In 1968, Hans-Werner Wanzlick and Karl Öfele separately reported metal-bonded N-heterocyclic carbenes. The synthesis and characterization of ((CH_{3})_{3}CCH_{2})Ta=CHC(CH_{3})_{3} by Richard R. Schrock in 1974 marked the first metal alkylidene complex. In 1991, Anthony J. Arduengo synthesized and crystallized the first persistent carbene, an NHC with large adamantane alkyl groups, accelerating the field of N-heterocarbene ligands to its current use.

== See also ==
- Carbene radical
- Carbyne
- Transition metal carbyne complex
- Transition metal vinylidene complex
