= Vinylene group =

In chemistry, vinylene (also ethenylene or 1,2-ethenediyl) is a divalent functional group (a part of a molecule) with formula −CH=CH−; namely, two carbons, each connected to the other by a double bond, to an hydrogen atom by a single bond, and to the rest of the molecule by another single bond.

This group can be viewed as a molecule of ethene (ethylene, H_{2}C=CH_{2}) with a hydrogen removed from each carbon; or a vinyl group −CH=CH_{2} with one hydrogen removed from the terminal carbon. It should not be confused with the vinylidene group =C=CH_{2} or >C=CH_{2}.

A vinylene unit attached to two distinct atoms other than hydrogen (namely R−CH=CH−R') is a source of cis-trans isomerism.

The vinylene group is the repeating unit in polyacetylene and in polyenes.

== See also ==
- Vinyl group, the monovalent group −CH=CH_{2}
- Vinylidene group, the other divalent group with formula C_{2}H_{2}, with structure CH_{2}=C<
