= Carbene radical =

Special class of organometallic carbenes

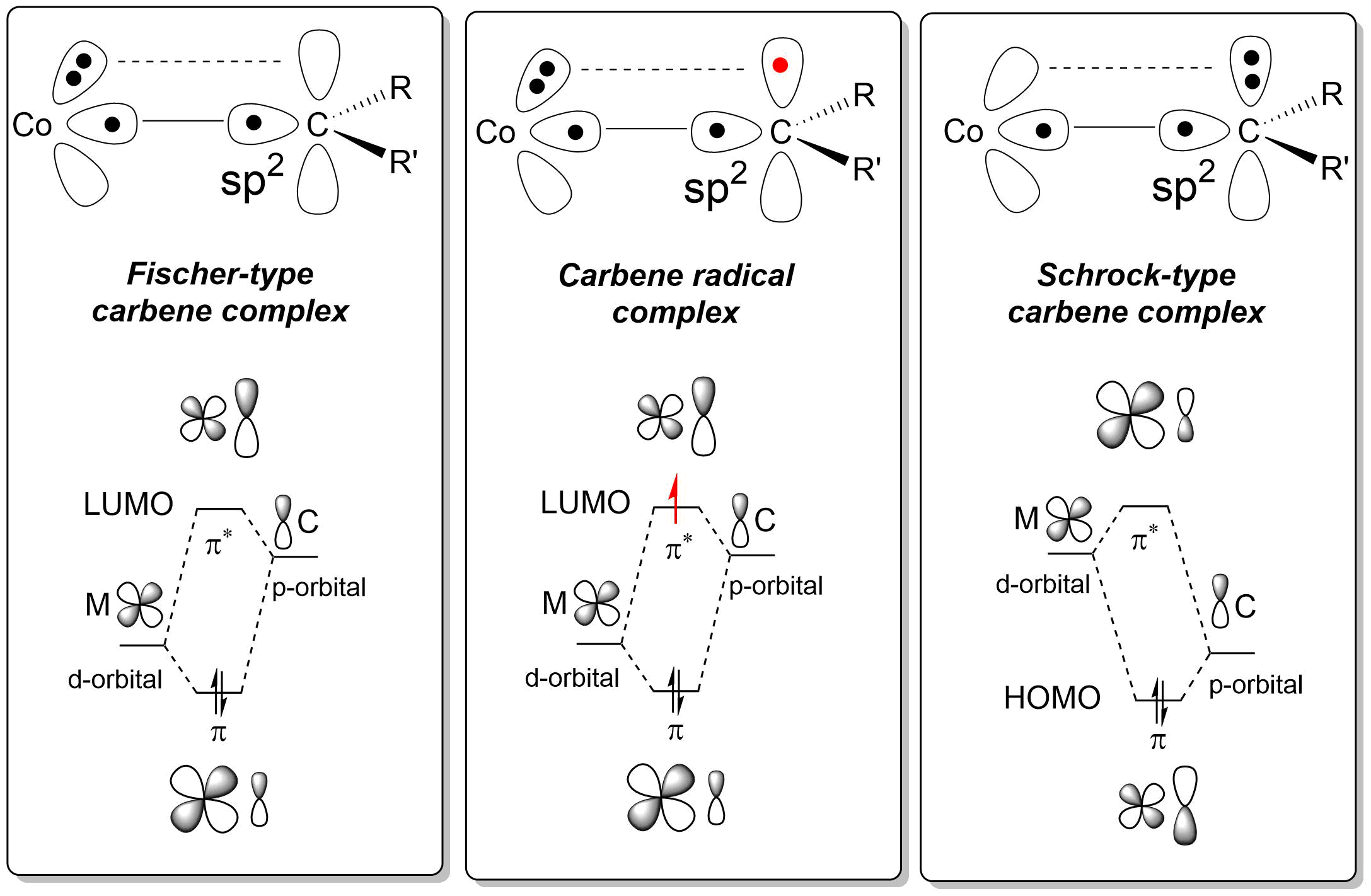
Bonding scheme of carbene radical complexes as compared to Schrock and Fischer-type carbene complexes

Carbene radicals are a special class of organometallic carbenes. The carbene radical can be formed by one-electron reduction of Fischer-type carbenes using an external reducing agent, or directly upon carbene formation at an open-shell transition metal complex (in particular low-spin cobalt(II) complexes) using diazo compounds and related carbene precursors. Cobalt(III)-carbene radicals have found catalytic applications in cyclopropanation reactions, as well as in a variety of other catalytic radical-type ring-closing reactions.

Theoretical calculations and EPR studies confirmed their radical-type behaviour and explained the bonding interactions underlying the stability of the carbene radical. Stable carbene radicals of other metals are known, but the catalytically relevant cobalt(III)-carbene radicals have thus far only been synthesized as long-lived reactive intermediates.

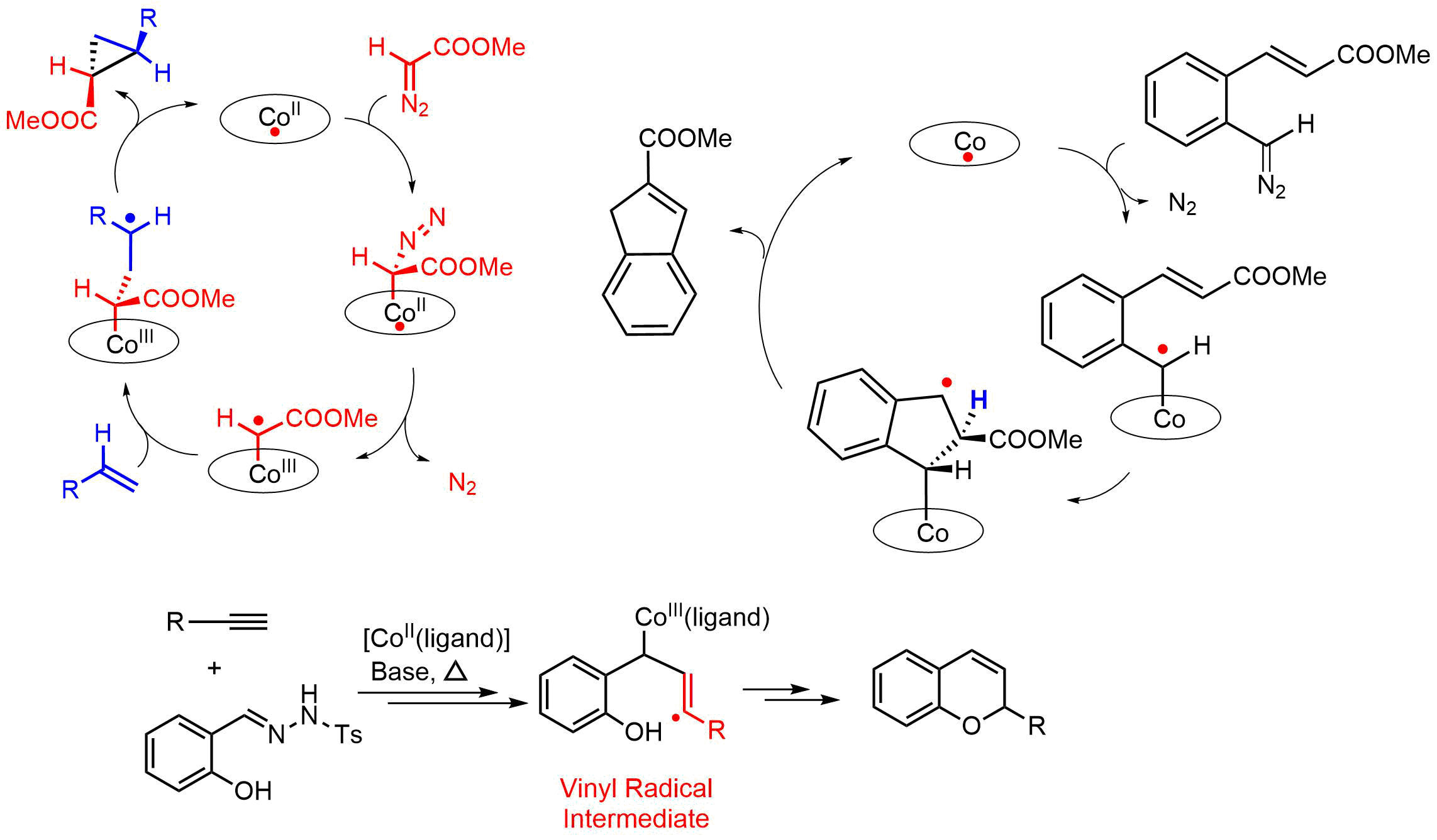
Examples of radical-type reactions involving carbene radical complexes

== Bonding interactions and radical reactivity ==
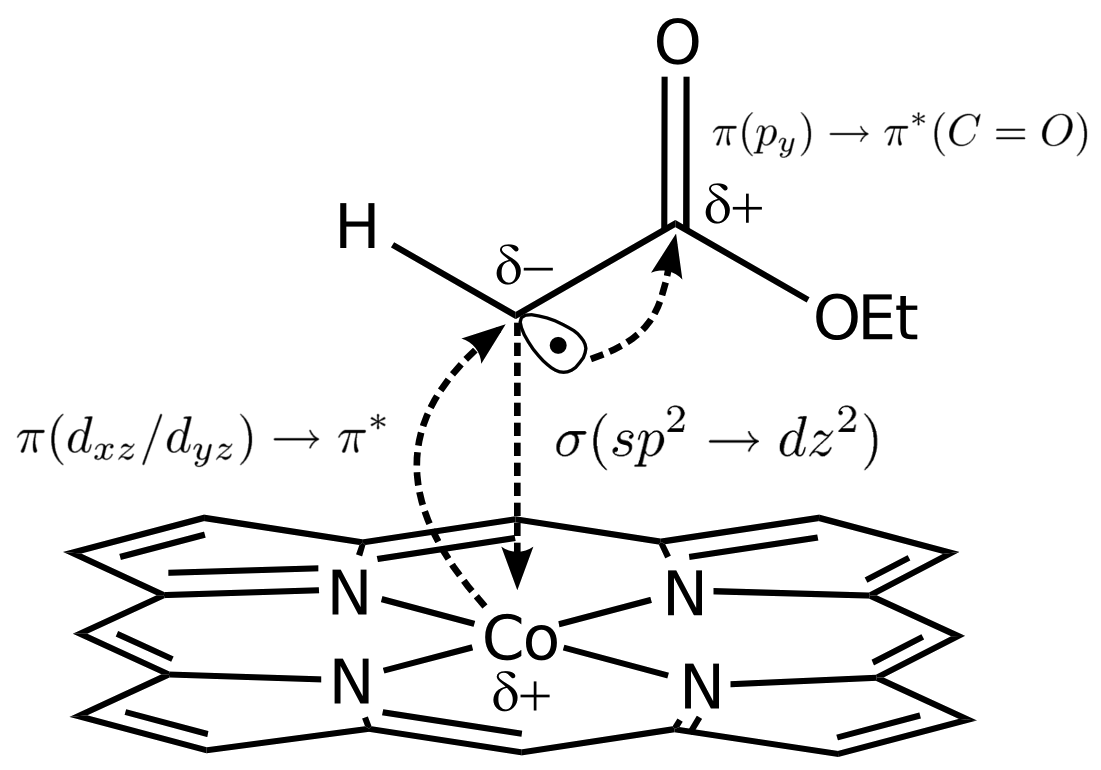
Example of carbene radical reaction intermediate generated by reaction of cobalt porphyrin and CHCO_{2}Et ligand. σ donation from the ligand to the "dz^{2}" orbital on the cobalt metal center occurs concurrent with π* back-donation from the t_{2g} symmetry orbitals.

The chemical bond present in carbene radicals is surprising in that it possesses aspects of both Fischer and Schrock type carbenes.As a result, the cobalt carbene radical complexes have discrete radical-character at their carbon atom, thus giving rise to interesting catalytic radical-type reaction pathways.

The mechanism of formation of a carbene radical at cobalt(II) typically involves carbene generation at the metal with simultaneous intramolecular electron transfer from the metal into the metal-carbene π* anti-bonding molecular orbital constructed from the metal d-orbital and the carbene p-orbital. As such, carbene radicals are perhaps best described as 'one-electron reduced Fischer-type carbenes'.

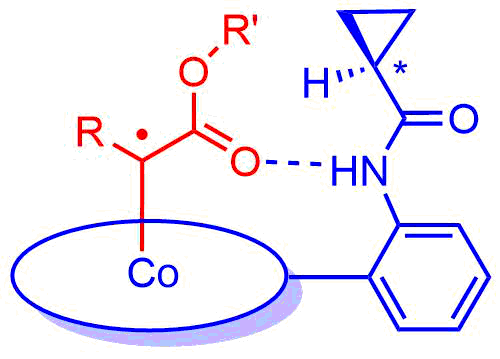
Second coordination sphere hydrogen-bonding effects in controlling carbene radical reactivity

Discrete electron transfer from a sigma-type metal d-orbital (typically the d_{z2} orbital) occurs, leads the typical radical character of the carbene carbon. This behaviour not only explains the carbon-centered radical-type reactivity of these complexes, but also their reduced electrophilicity (suppressing carbene-carbene dimerisation side reactions) as well as their enhanced reactivity to electron-deficient substrates. Furthermore, second coordination sphere hydrogen-bonding interactions give rise to faster reactions because H-bonds are stronger to the reduced carbene as compared to the precursor. Such H-bonding interactions can also facilitate chirality transfer in enantioselective carbene-transfer reactions.

In order for the σ bond to be stabilized (typically with a bond order slightly less than 1), a back-bonding action from the π molecular orbital to the anti-bonding π* molecular orbital is necessary and the porphyrin ring serves as an electron π-symmetry "buffer" to ensure this interaction is obtained.

The back-donation to the π* orbital would result in unfavorable excess electron density on the carbene carbon but the presence of adjacent functional groups (carbonyl or sulfonyl groups have the desired electronegativity) relieve this electron build-up and yield the final radical electron, which occupies a single p atomic orbital state on the carbon.

== See also ==
- Carbene analog
- Spin transition
- Quantum chemistry
- HOMO/LUMO
