= Transition metal alkyne complex =

Organometallic chemical compound

In organometallic chemistry, a transition metal alkyne complex is a coordination compound containing one or more alkyne ligands. Such compounds are intermediates in many catalytic reactions that convert alkynes to other organic products, e.g. hydrogenation and trimerization.

They are distinct from acetylide complexes.

== Synthesis ==
Transition metal alkyne complexes are often formed by the displacement of labile ligands by the alkyne. For example, a variety of cobalt-alkyne complexes arise by the reaction of alkynes with dicobalt octacarbonyl.

Co_{2}(CO)_{8} + R_{2}C_{2} → (R_{2}C_{2})Co_{2}(CO)_{6} + 2 CO

Many alkyne complexes are produced by reduction of metal halides:

Cp_{2}TiCl_{2} + Mg + Me_{3}SiC≡CSiMe_{3} → Cp_{2}Ti[(CSiMe_{3})_{2}] + MgCl_{2}

Complexes of dichloroacetylene are produced by in situ reduction of the metal by the alkyne:

4 C_{2}Cl_{2} + 2 WCl_{6} → [WCl_{4}(C_{2}Cl_{2})]_{2} + 2 C_{2}Cl_{4}.

== Reactions ==
Transition metal alkyne complexes participate in many reactions.

Protonation of alkyne ligands gives alkenyl complexes:

LnM(RC≡CR) + H^{+} → [LnM−CR=CRH]^{+}

Complexes of terminal alkenes are prone to rearrange to vinylidene derivatives:

LnM(HC≡CR) → LnM=C=CRH

The Pauson–Khand reaction provides a route to cyclopentenones via the intermediacy of cobalt-alkyne complexes.

PK reaction

== Structure and bonding ==
Structures of various metal-alkyne complexes.

The coordination of alkynes to transition metals is similar to that of alkenes. The bonding is described by the Dewar–Chatt–Duncanson model. Upon complexation the C-C bond elongates and the alkynyl carbon bends away from 180º. For example, in the phenylpropyne complex Pt(PPh_{3})_{2}(MeC_{2}Ph), the C-C distance is 1.277(25) vs 1.20 Å for a typical alkyne. The C-C-C angle distorts 40° from linearity upon complexation. Because the bending induced by complexation, strained alkynes such as cycloheptyne and cyclooctyne are stabilized by complexation.

The C≡C vibration of alkynes occurs near 2300 cm^{−1} in the IR spectrum. This mode shifts upon complexation to around 1800 cm^{−1}, indicating a weakening of the C-C bond.

=== η^{2}-coordination to a single metal center ===
When bonded side-on to a single metal atom, an alkyne serves as a dihapto usually two-electron donor. For early metal complexes, e.g., Cp_{2}Ti(C_{2}R_{2}), strong π-backbonding into one of the π* antibonding orbitals of the alkyne is indicated. This complex is described as a metallacyclopropene derivative of Ti(IV). For late transition metal complexes, e.g., Pt(PPh_{3})_{2}(MeC_{2}Ph), the π-backbonding is less prominent, and the complex is assigned oxidation state 0.

In some complexes, the alkyne is classified as a four-electron donor. In these cases, both pairs of pi-electrons donate to the metal. This kind of bonding was first implicated in complexes of the type W(CO)(R_{2}C_{2})_{3}.

=== η^{2}, η^{2}-coordination bridging two metal centers ===
Because alkynes have two π bonds, alkynes can form stable complexes in which they bridge two metal centers. The alkyne donates a total of four electrons, with two electrons donated to each of the metals. And example of a complex with this bonding scheme is η^{2}-diphenylacetylene-(hexacarbonyl)dicobalt(0).

=== Benzyne complexes ===
Transition metal benzyne complexes represent a special case of alkyne complexes since the free benzynes are not stable in the absence of the metal.

== Applications ==
=== Semihydrogenation ===
Metal alkyne complexes are intermediates in the semihydrogenation of alkynes to alkenes:

C_{2}R_{2} + H_{2} → cis-C_{2}R_{2}H_{2}

This transformation is conducted on a large scale in refineries, which unintentionally produce acetylene during the production of ethylene by steam cracking. It is also useful in the preparation of fine chemicals. Semihydrogenation affords cis alkenes.

=== Other processes ===
Metal-alkyne complexes are also intermediates in the metal-catalyzed trimerization and tetramerizations. Cyclooctatetraene is produced from acetylene via the intermediacy of metal alkyne complexes.

Acrylic acid was once prepared by the hydrocarboxylation of acetylene:

C_{2}H_{2} + H_{2}O + CO → H_{2}C=CHCO_{2}H

With the shift away from coal-based (acetylene) to petroleum-based feedstocks (olefins), catalytic reactions with alkynes are not widely practiced industrially.

Polyacetylene has been produced using metal catalysis involving alkyne complexes.

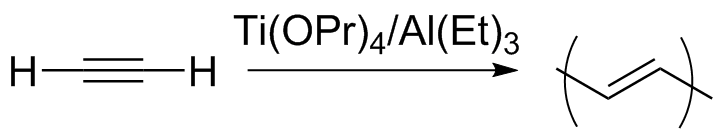
Ti-catalyzed polymerization of acetylene, inspired by Ziegler–Natta catalysis.

Cuprous chloride also catalyzes the dimerization of acetylene to vinylacetylene, once used as a precursor to various polymers such a neoprene. Mechanistic studies suggest that this reaction proceeds by insertion of acetylene into a copper(I) acetylide complex.
