= Carbyne =

Organic molecule containing a neutral carbon atom with 3 unpaired valence electrons

doublet (1 radical, 1 pair, 1 vacant orbital)

quartet (3 radicals)

In organic chemistry, a carbyne is a general term for any compound whose structure consists of an electrically neutral carbon atom connected by a single covalent bond and has three non-bonded electrons. The carbon atom has either one or three unpaired electrons, depending on its excitation state; making it a radical. The chemical formula can be written R−C· or R−C^{3·} (also written as ⫶C−R), or just CH.

Carbynes can be seen as derivatives of the simplest such compound, the methylidyne radical or unsubstituted carbyne H−C· or H−C^{3·}, in which the functional group is a hydrogen atom.

== Electronic configuration ==
Carbyne molecules are generally found to be in electronic doublet states: the non-bonding electrons on carbon are arranged as one radical (unpaired electron) and one electron pair, leaving a vacant atomic orbital, rather than being a triradical (the quartet state). The simplest case is the CH radical, which has an electron configuration 1σ^{2} 2σ^{2} 3σ^{2} 1π. Here the 1σ molecular orbital is essentially the carbon 1s atomic orbital, and the 2σ is the C–H bonding orbital formed by overlap of a carbon sp hybrid orbital with the hydrogen 1s orbital. The 3σ is a carbon non-bonding orbital pointing along the C–H axis away from the hydrogen, while there are two non-bonding 1π orbitals perpendicular to the C–H axis. However the 3σ is an sp hybrid which has lower energy than the 1π orbital which is pure p, so the 3σ is filled before the 1π. The CH radical is in fact isoelectronic with the nitrogen atom which does have three unpaired electrons in accordance with Hund's rule of maximum multiplicity. However the nitrogen atom has three degenerate p orbitals, in contrast to the CH radical where hybridization of one orbital (the 3σ) leads to an energy difference.

== Occurrence ==
A carbyne can occur as a short-lived reactive intermediate. For instance, fluoromethylidyne (CF) can be detected in the gas phase by spectroscopy as an intermediate in the flash photolysis of CHFBr_{2}.

Carbynes can act as trivalent ligands in complexes with transition metals, in which they are connected to a metal by the three non-bonded electrons in the –C^{3•} group. Examples of such coordination compounds are Cl(CO)_{4}W≡C-CH_{3}, WBr(CO)_{2}(2,2'-bipyridine)≡C-aryl and WBr(CO)_{2}(PPh_{3})_{2}≡C-NR_{2}. Such a compound can be obtained by the reaction of tungsten hexacarbonyl W(CO)_{6} with lithium diisopropylamide to form (^{i}Pr_{2}N)(OLi)C=W(CO)_{5}. This salt is then oxidized with either oxalyl bromide or triphenylphosphine dibromide, followed by addition of triphenylphosphine. Another method is to treat a methoxy metal carbene with a Lewis acid.
