= Transition metal carbyne complex =

Transition metal carbyne complexes are organometallic compounds with a triple bond between carbon and the transition metal. This triple bond consists of a σ-bond and two π-bonds. The HOMO of the carbyne ligand interacts with the LUMO of the metal to create the σ-bond. The two π-bonds are formed when the two HOMO orbitals of the metal back-donate to the LUMO of the carbyne. They are also called metal alkylidynes—the organic fragment containing the carbon bonded to the metal is a carbyne ligand. Such compounds are useful in organic synthesis of alkynes and nitriles. They have been the focus of much fundamental research.

== Synthesis ==
Transition metal carbyne complexes are most common for the early transition metals, especially niobium, tantalum, molybdenum, tungsten, and rhenium. They can also have low-valence metals as well as high-valence metals.

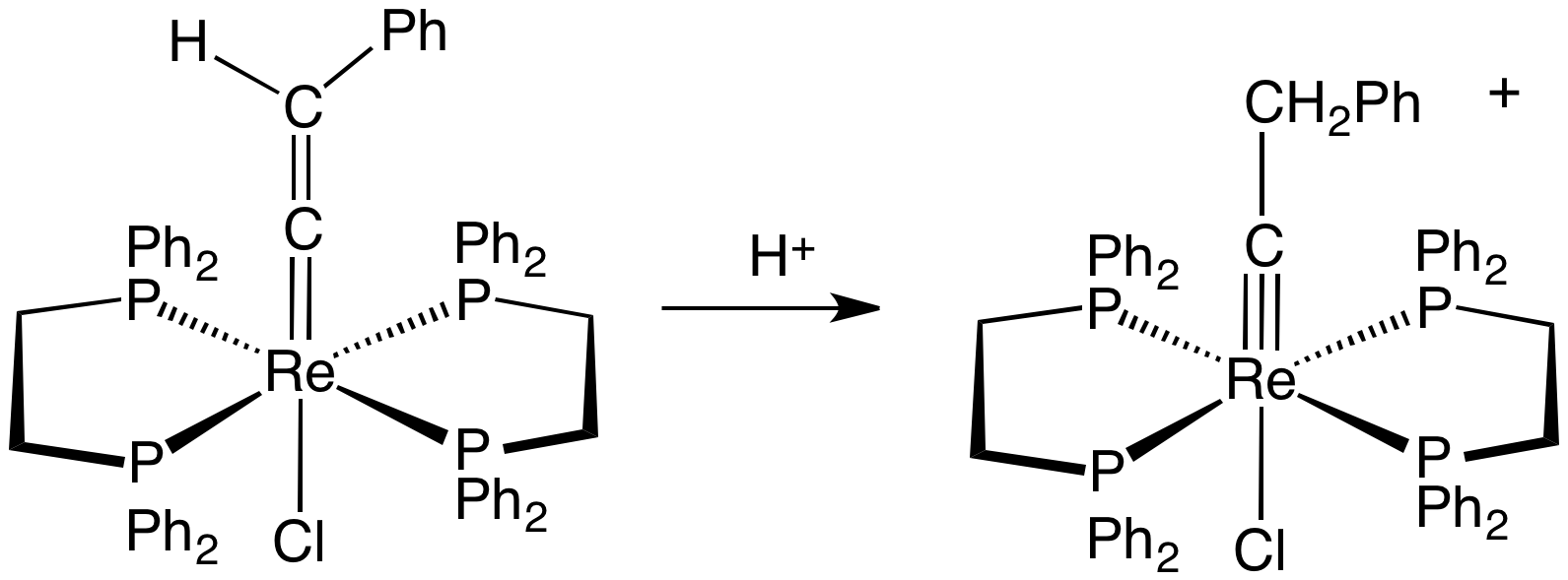
Protonation of a Re(I) vinylidene complex to give the corresponding cationic Re(V) carbyne derivative.

The first Fischer carbyne complex was reported in 1973. Two years later in 1975, the first "Schrock carbyne" was reported.

Many high-valent carbyne complexes have since been prepared, often by dehydrohalogenation of carbene complexes. Alternatively, amino-substituted carbyne ligands sometimes form upon protonation of electron-rich isonitrile complexes. Similarly, O-protonation of μ_{3}-CO ligands in clusters gives hydroxycarbyne complexes. Vinyl ligands have been shown to rearrange into carbyne ligands. Addition of electrophiles to vinylidene ligands also affords carbyne complexes.

=== Bridging alkylidyne ligands in cluster compounds ===
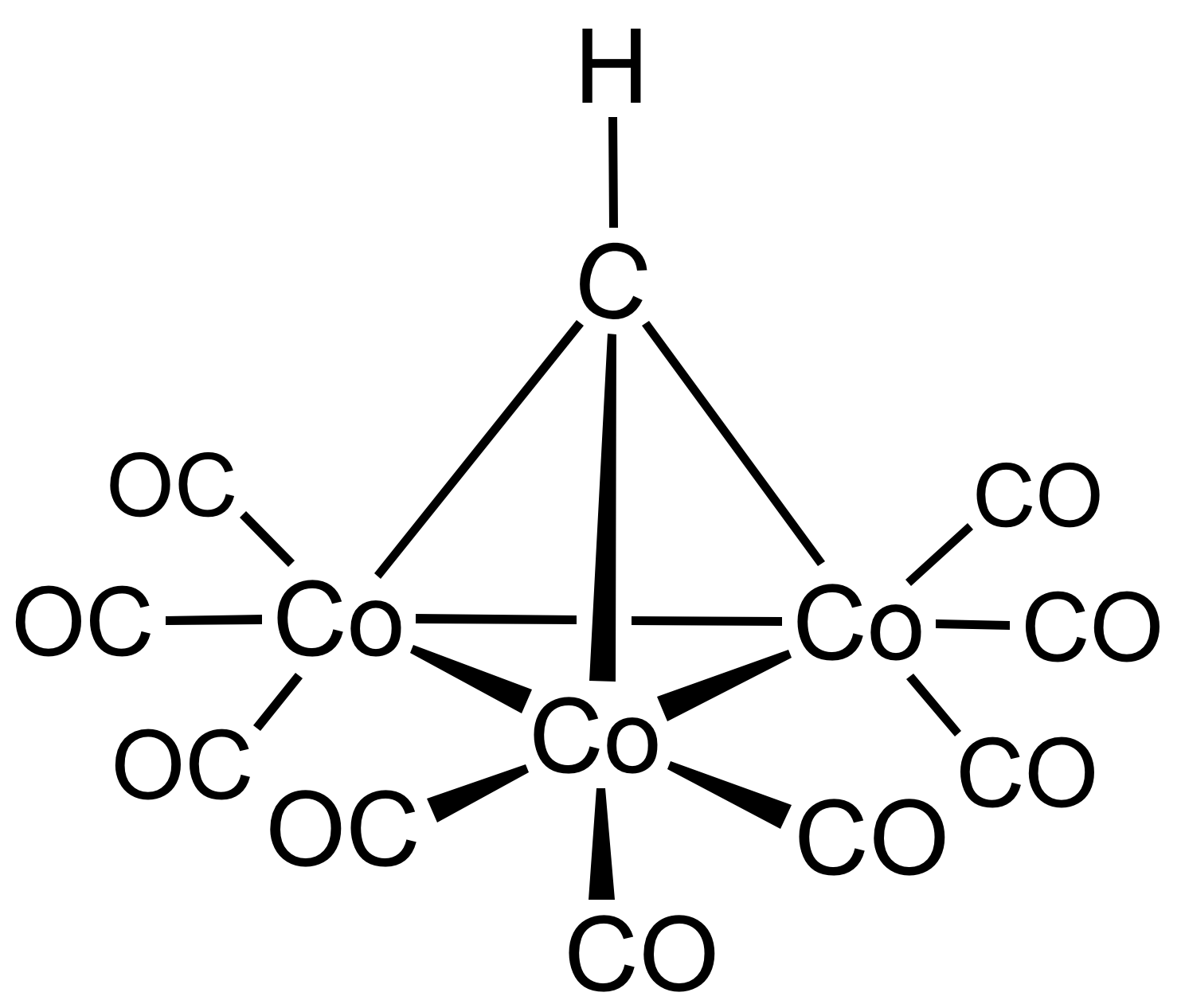
Methylidynetricobaltnonacarbonyl (formula: HCCo_{3}(CO)_{9}) is a metal cluster that contains the methylidyne ligand.

Some metal carbynes dimerize to give dimetallacyclobutadienes. In these complexes, the carbyne ligand serves as a bridging ligand.

Several cluster-bound carbyne complexes are known, typically with CO ligands. These compounds do not feature MC triple bonds; instead the carbyne carbon is tetrahedral. Tricobalt derivatives are prepared by treating cobalt carbonyl with haloforms:

2 HCBr_{3} + 9/2 Co_{2}(CO)_{8} → 2 HCCo_{3}(CO)_{9} + 18 CO + 3 CoBr_{2}

== Structure ==
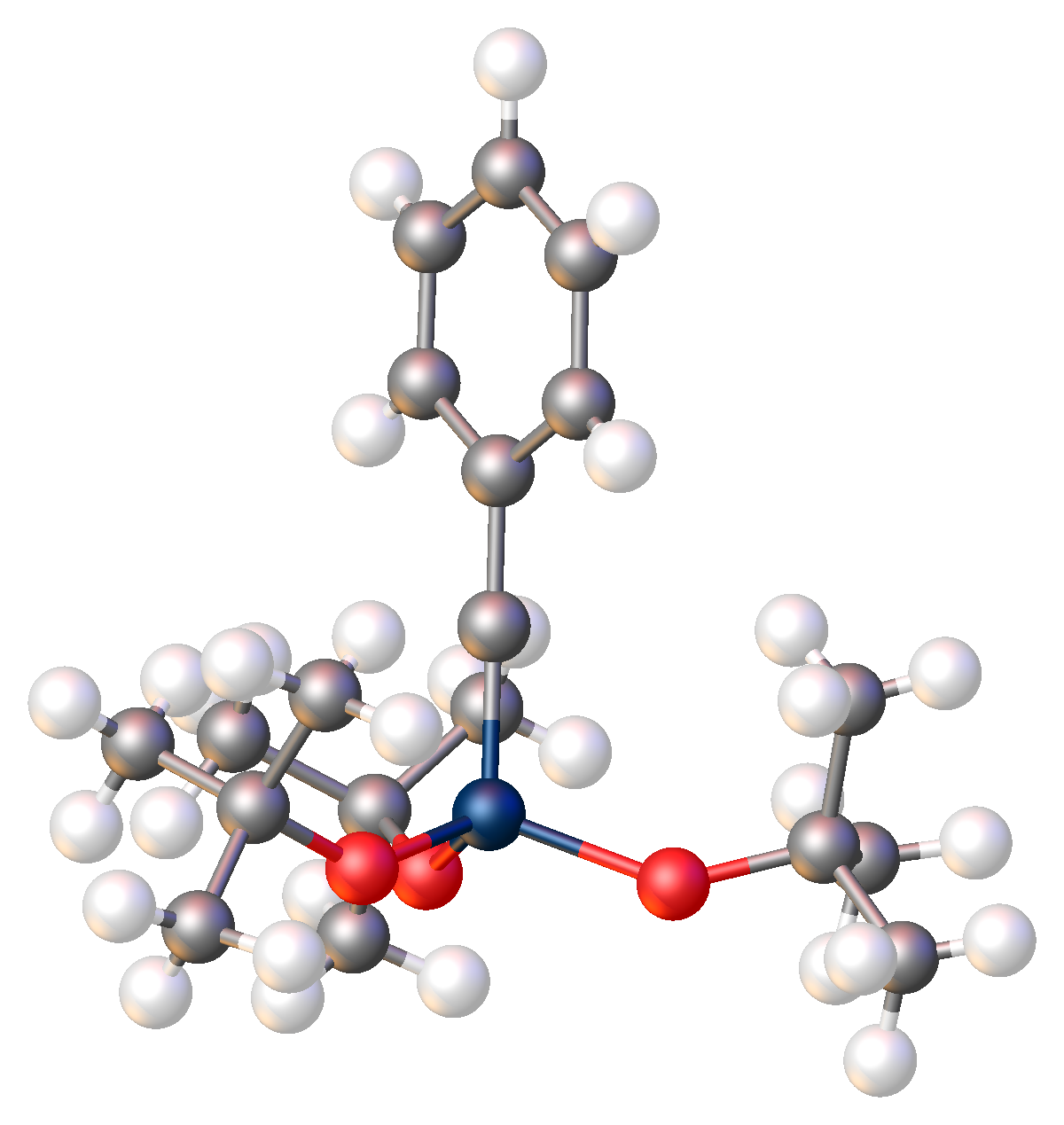
Structure of PhCW(OBu-t)_{3}.

Monomeric metal carbyne complexes exhibit fairly linear M–C–R linkages according to X-ray crystallography. The M–C distances are typically shorter than the M–C bonds found in metal carbenes. The bond angle is generally between 170° and 180°. Analogous to Fischer and Schrock carbenes; Fischer and Schrock carbynes are also known. Fischer carbynes usually have lower oxidation state metals and the ligands are π-accepting/electron-withdrawing ligands. Schrock carbynes on the other hand typically have higher oxidation state metals and electron-donating/anionic ligands. In a Fischer carbyne the C-carbyne exhibits electrophilic behavior while Schrock carbynes display nucleophilic reactivity on the carbyne carbon. In 2025, radical reactivity at the carbyne carbon was also reported. Carbyne complexes have also been characterized by many methods including infrared Spectroscopy, Raman spectroscopy, and single-crystal X-ray diffraction. Bond lengths, bond angles and structures can be inferred from these and other analytical techniques.

Metal carbyne complexes also exhibit a large trans effect, where the ligand opposite the carbyne is typically labile.

== Reactions and applications ==
Hexa(tert-butoxy)ditungsten(III) is a catalyst for alkyne metathesis. The catalytic cycle involves a carbyne intermediate.

Some carbyne complexes react with electrophiles at C-carbyne followed by association of the anion. The net reaction gives a transition metal carbene complex:

L_{n}M≡CR + HX → L_{n}(X)M=CHR

These complexes can also undergo photochemical reactions.

In some carbyne complexes, coupling of the carbyne ligand to a carbonyl is observed. Protonation of the carbyne carbon and conversion of the carbyne ligand into a π-allyl.

== Main group analogue ==
A sulfur-based main group analog of a carbyne complex has been prepared by Seppalt and coworkers. The compound, trifluoro(2,2,2-trifluoroethylidyne)-λ^{6}-sulfurane, F_{3}C–C≡SF_{3}, prepared by dehydrofluorination of F_{3}C–CH=SF_{4} or F_{3}C–CH_{2}–SF_{5}, is an unstable gas that readily undergoes dimerization to form trans-(CF_{3})(SF_{3})C=C(CF_{3})(SF_{3}) above –50 °C.
