= Fluoromethylidyne =

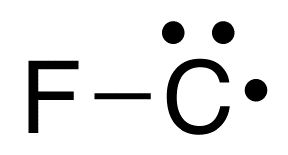

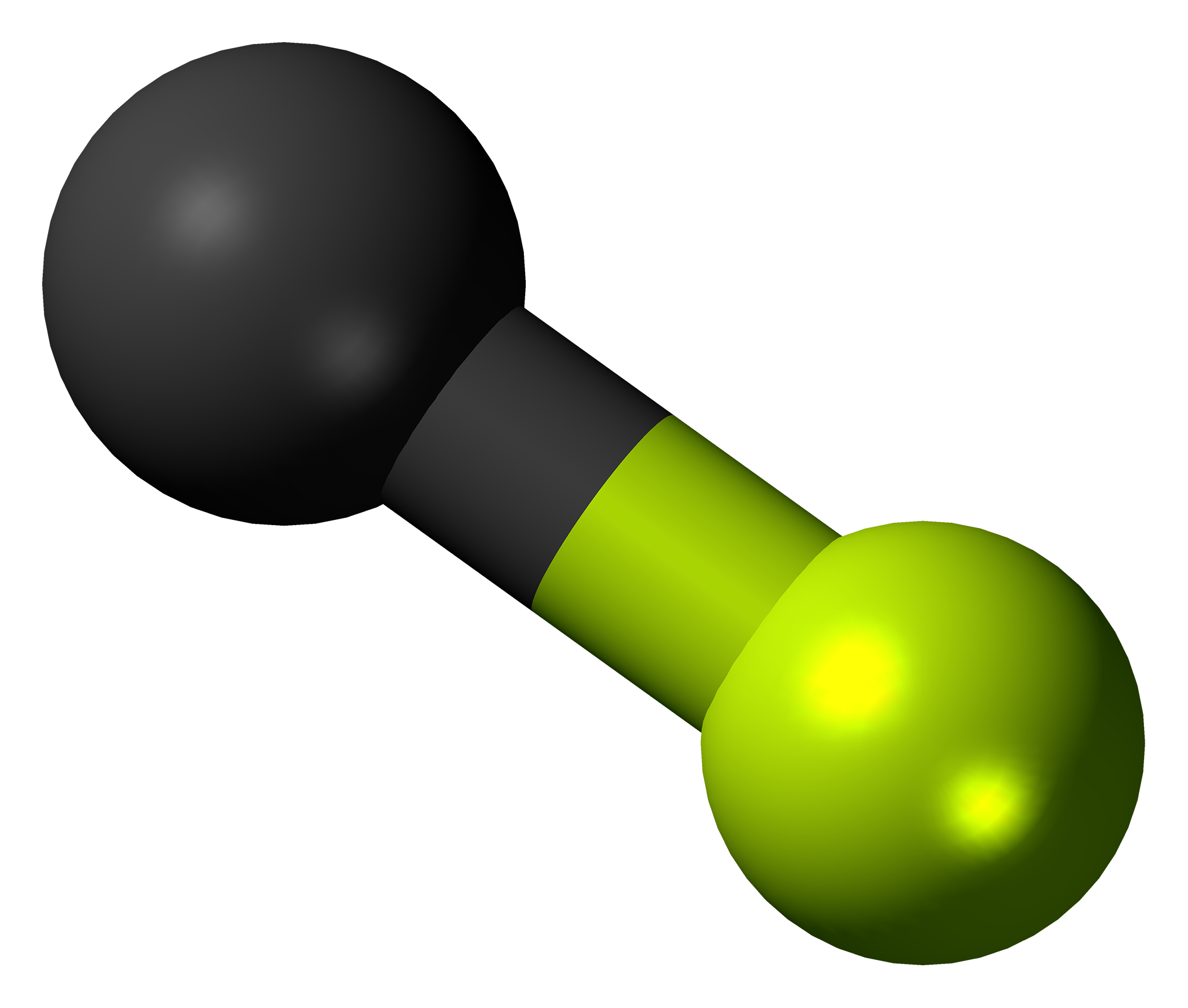

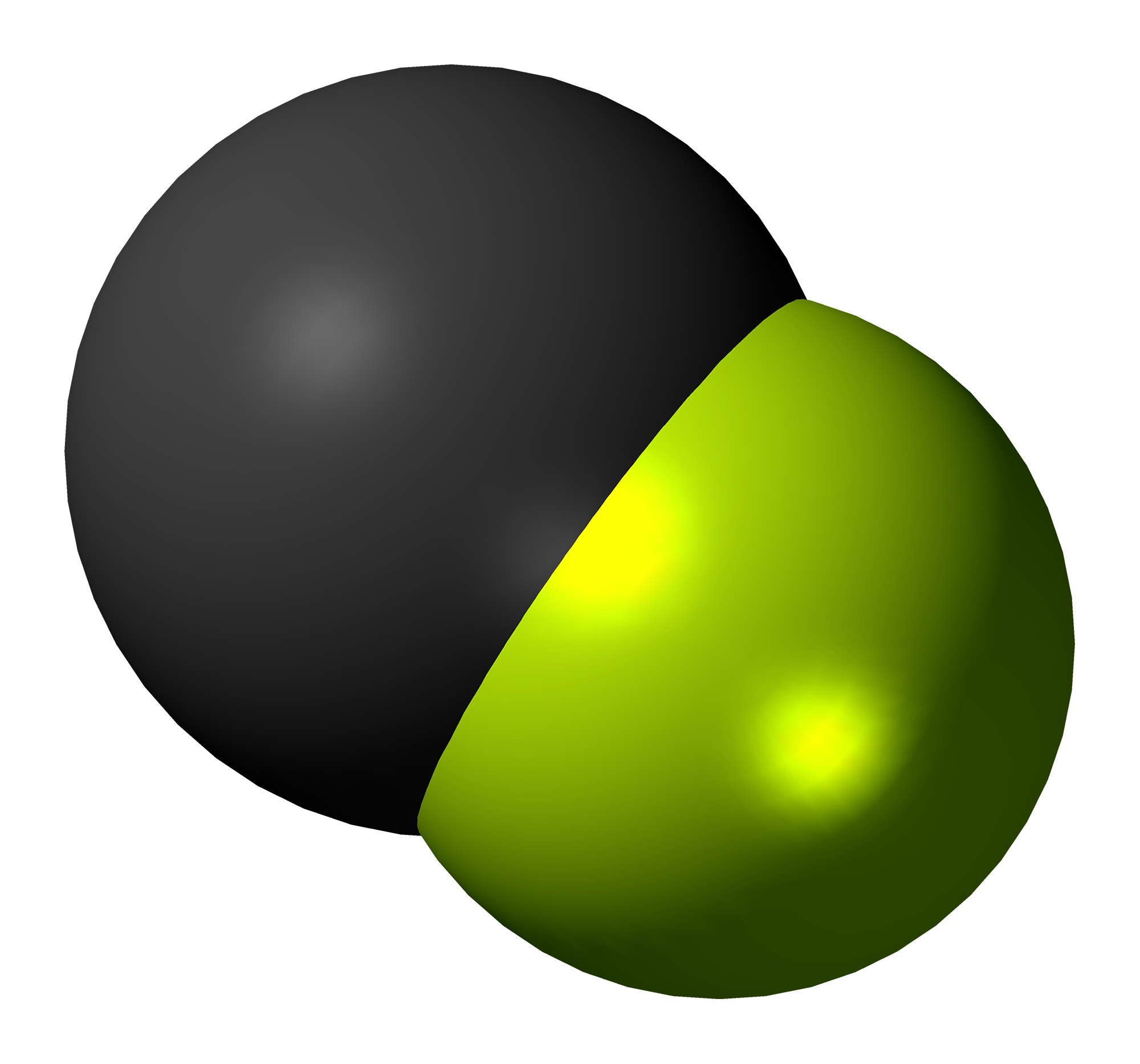

Names
- IUPAC name: Fluoromethylidyne (substitutive); Fluoridocarbon(•) (additive)
- Other names: Carbon(I) fluoride; Carbon monofluoride; Fluorocarbyne; Fluoromethylyne

Identifiers
CAS Number	3889-75-6
3D model (JSmol)	Interactive image
ChemSpider	10605706
PubChem CID	155293615
CompTox Dashboard (EPA)	DTXSID101315196
- InChI: InChI=1S/CF/c1-2 Key: ISOSXCFSIDVNNC-UHFFFAOYSA-N
- SMILES: [C]F

Properties
Chemical formula	CF^{•}
Molar mass	31.0091 g mol^{−1}
- Except where otherwise noted, data are given for materials in their standard state (at 25 °C [77 °F], 100 kPa). verify (what is ?) Infobox references

Fluoromethylidyne is not a stable chemical species but a metastable radical containing one highly reactive carbon atom bound to one fluorine atom with the formula CF. The carbon atom has a lone-pair and a single unpaired (radical) electron in the ground state.

Ground-state fluoromethylidyne radicals can be produced by the ultraviolet photodissociation of dibromodifluoromethane at a wavelength of 248 nanometers.

It readily and irreversibly dimerises to difluoroacetylene, also known as difluoroethyne, perfluoroacetylene, or di- or perfluoroethylyne. Under certain conditions it can hexamerise to hexafluorobenzene.

== See also ==
- Carbyne
