= Vinylidene group =

In chemistry, vinylidenes are compounds with the functional group C=CH_{2}. An example is 1,1-dichloroethene (CCl_{2}=CH_{2}) commonly called vinylidene chloride. It and vinylidene fluoride are precursors to commercially useful polymers.

== Monomers and polymers ==
Vinylidene chloride and fluoride can be converted to linear polymers polyvinylidene chloride (PVDC) and polyvinylidene fluoride (PVDF). The polymerization reaction is:

n CH_{2}=CX_{2} → (CH_{2}−CX_{2})_{n}

These vinylidene polymers are isomeric with those produced from vinylene monomers. Thus polyvinylene fluoride from vinylene fluoride (HFC=CHF).

== Vinylidene complexes ==
Although vinylidenes are only transient species, they are found as ligands in organometallic chemistry. They typically arise by the protonation of metal acetylides or by the reaction of metal electrophiles with terminal alkynes. The complex chloro(cyclopentadienyl)bis(triphenylphosphine)ruthenium readily forms such complexes:

CpRu(PPh_{3})_{2}Cl + RC_{2}H + KPF_{6} → [CpRu(PPh_{3})_{2}(=C=C(H)Ph]PF_{6} + KCl

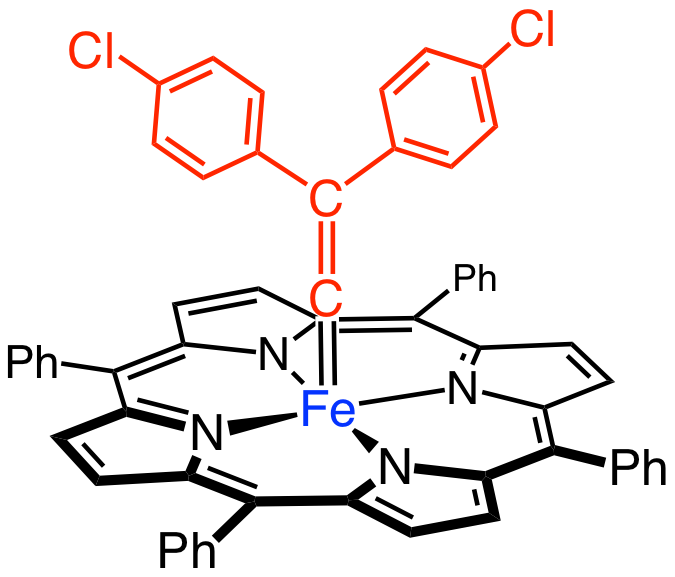
Structure of the DDT-derived vinylidene complex Fe(TPP)C_{2}(C_{6}H_{4}Cl)_{2}, one of several iron carbenoid complexes prepared by Mansuy (TPP = conjugate base of tetraphenylporphyrin).

== Gas-phase existence of vinylidenes ==
Featuring divalent carbon, vinylidenes are unusual species in organic chemistry. They are unstable as solids or liquids but can be generated as stable dilute gases. The parent member of this series is methylidenecarbene. With the formula :C=CH_{2}), it is a carbene.

== IUPAC nomenclature ==
In IUPAC nomenclature, 1,1-ethenediyl describes the connectivity >C=CH_{2}. The related species ethenylidenes have the connectivity =C=CH_{2}.

== See also ==
- Vinylene group, −CH=CH−
- Methylene group, −CH_{2}−
- Vinyl group, −CH=CH_{2}
