= Transition metal alkenyl complex =

A transition metal alkenyl complex is an organometallic compound containing a metal bound to a alkenyl group (i.e., the motif M-CR=CRR'). The simplest alkenyl ligand is vinyl.

== Ligand properties ==
Examples of common bonding modes for alkenyl ligands (Me = methyl).

According to the covalent bond classification method, a terminal alkenyl is an anionic X-type ligand.

Some alkenyl ligands are bridging ligands, in which case they provide 3 electrons to the pair of metals. A third class of alkenyl ligands bind in an η^{2}- mode. They are also 3-electron ligands.

Two resonance structures for an η^{2}-vinyl molybdenum trimethylphosphite complex (Ph = phenyl).

== Synthesis and occurrence ==
In the laboratory preparations, alkenyl complexes are often prepared by salt metathesis using vinyl lithium or vinyl Grignard reagents. They also arise by protonation of alkyne complexes. Oxidative addition of vinyl halides gives alkenyl complexes:

CH_{2}=CHBr + Pd(PPh_{3})_{4} → PdBr(CH=CH_{2})(PPh_{3})_{2} + 2 PPh_{3} (Ph = phenyl)

Homoleptic vinyl complexes are unknown, but a trivinyl complex has been characterized.

Metal alkenyl complexes are intermediates in the semihydrogenation of alkynes to alkenes
