= Martin Körbling =

German professor of medicine

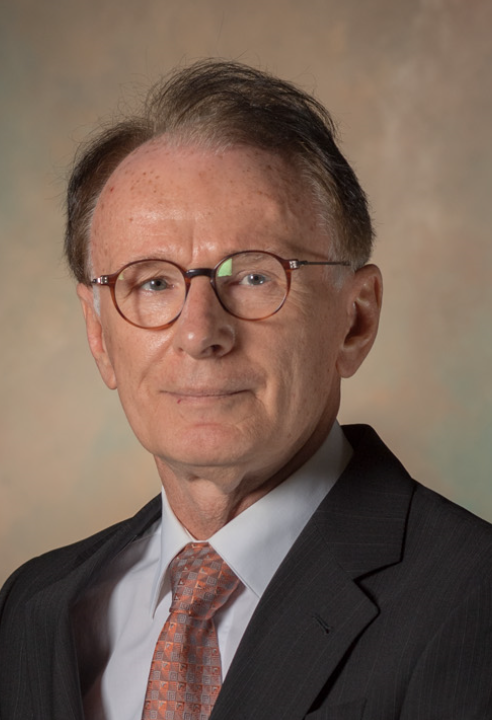
Martin Körbling, German-American internist and hematologist.

Martin Körbling (born July 13, 1946, in Speyer, Germany) is a German-American internist and hematologist, university professor, medical researcher and pioneer of blood stem cell transplantation.

== Career ==
The classical language-humanistic high school time in Speyer was followed by Körbling's medical education at the Ruprecht-Karls-Universität Heidelberg in Germany. His dissertation at the Pharmacological Institute of Heidelberg University under the leadership of Franz Gross dealt with the pharmacological effects of the hypotensive substance sodium nitroprusside. After finishing his medical studies, Körbling joined the renowned stem cell research group around Theodor M. Fliedner at the University of Ulm in Germany. At the invitation of the medical faculty of the Johns Hopkins University in Baltimore, he began in 1979 a 2-year research fellowship at the Johns Hopkins Oncology Center under the leadership of George W. Santos. This was followed by medical specialist training in internal medicine, subsequent habilitation at the Heidelberg University Hospital for Hematology, Oncology and Rheumatology and appointment of Professor of Medicine and Internist.

As a result of his stem cell research activities and at the invitation of the Ministry of Health of the USSR, Körbling, representing the Federal Republic of Germany as one of the experts around the then President of the International Atomic Energy Agency (IAEA) Hans Blix, had in 1988 the opportunity to be among the first western observers to see and document the disastrous effects of the Chernobyl nuclear power plant accident on the cities of Chernobyl and Pripyat, including the medical effects on its population.

In 1990, Körbling was appointed to The University of Texas MD Anderson Cancer Center, where he worked as a clinical professor in the field of cellular therapy and stem cell transplantation, and as a scientist in the field of blood stem cell transplantation. Due to his research activities, he was granted the citizenship of the United States in 2005 while retaining German citizenship. In his capacity as a university professor, Körbling initiated and directed a student exchange program between the University of Texas MD Anderson Cancer Center and Heidelberg University.

== Scientific achievements ==
Körbling's scientific achievements in blood stem cell research and transplantation are documented by more than 150 published, peer-reviewed scientific articles in American and European professional journals, including the renowned The New England Journal of Medicine and the publication organ of the American Society of Hematology (ASH). Building on the first results of the research group around E. Donnall Thomas at Columbia University he developed at the University of Ulm a model of stem cell apheresis and hematopoietic stem cell transplantation in the preclinical dog model. In 1985, Körbling succeeded in the worldwide first successful clinical transplantation of circulating stem cells at the Heidelberg University Medical Center, a transplant procedure that has nowadays largely replaced clinical bone marrow transplantation. In a first series of allogeneic hematopoietic stem cell transplantations in 1996, he provided clinical evidence that blood stem cells are capable of building up the entire blood-forming system in a clinical setting and maintaining it functional for life. His further scientific work in 2012 provided indications that the regenerative potential of stem cells has a plasticity that is not absolutely bound to differentiation specifications. These data were published in the prestigious The New England Journal of Medicine and commented on in an article in The New York Times. As an expert in apheresis technology, Körbling was issued a US patent that describes the elimination of circulating tumor cells using nanotechnology.

== Publications (selection) ==
- Autologous transplantation of blood-derived hemopoietic stem cells after myeloablative therapy in a patient with Burkitt's lymphoma. Blood., Martin Körbling, Dörken B, Ho AD, Pezzutto A, Hunstein W, Fliedner TM. 1986 Feb; 67 (2): 529–32.
- Allogeneic blood stem cell transplantation for refractory leukemia and lymphoma: potential advantage of blood over marrow allografts. Blood., Martin Körbling, Przepiorka D, Huh YO, Engel H, van Besien K, Giralt S, Andersson B, Kleine HD, Seong D, Deisseroth AB, et al. 1995 Mar 15; 85 (6): 1659–65.
- Twenty-five years of peripheral blood stem cell transplantation Blood., Martin Körbling, Freireich EJ., 2011 Jun 16; 117 (24): 6411–6. Review.
- Hepatocytes and epithelial cells of donor origin in recipients of peripheral-blood stem cells., Martin Körbling, Katz RL, Khanna A, Ruifrok AC, Rondon G, Albitar M, Champlin RE, Estrov Z, N Engl J Med. 2002 Mar 7; 346 (10): 738–46.
- Adult stem cells for tissue repair - a new therapeutic concept?, Martin Körbling, Estrov Z. N Engl J Med. 2003 Aug 7; 349 (6): 570–82. Review.

== Honors and memberships ==
=== Honors ===
- 1976: Science Award of the City of Ulm
- 1986: Karl Heinrich Bauer Award on the occasion of the 600th anniversary of the Ruprecht Karls University of Heidelberg
- National Leadership Award of the National Republican Congressional Committee; Honorary Co-chairman Physician's Advisory Board
- 2012: Honorary membership of the German Society of Hematology and Oncology (DGHO)

=== professional memberships ===
- European Bone Marrow Transplant Group (EBMT)
- American Society of Hematology (ASH)
- International Society for Stem Cell Research (ISSCR)
- German Society for Hematology and Oncologies (DGHO)
- European Hematology Association (EHA)

== Literature (selection) ==
- Stem cell grafts., Martin Körbling, (together with Zander AR), In: Hematopoietic Stem Cell Transplantation: A Handbook for Clinicians, Chapter 13, 2nd edition; Wingard JR, Gastineau D, Leather H, Snyder EL, Szczepiorkowski ZM, eds., American Association of Blood Banks (AABB), 2014, ISBN 9781563958762
- Circulating stem cells., Martin Körbling, In: Bone Marrow Transplantation 1st Edition, Forman SJ, Blume KG, Thomas ED, eds., 1994, ISBN 9780865422537
- Blood stem cells., Martin Körbling, In: Clinical Bone Marrow and Blood Stem Cell Transplantation (2nd Edition), Atkinson K, ed., 1999, ISBN 9780521622882
- History of blood stem cell transplants, Martin Körbling (together with Fliedner TM), In: Blood stem cell transplants, Gale R, Juttner CA, Henon P eds., Cambridge University Press, 1994, ISBN 9780521442107
