= Biological functions of nitric oxide =

Functions of nitric oxide in organisms

Biological functions of nitric oxide are roles that nitric oxide plays within biology.

Nitric oxide (nitrogen monoxide) is a molecule and chemical compound with chemical formula of NO. In mammals including humans, nitric oxide is a signaling molecule involved in several physiological and pathological processes. It is a powerful vasodilator with a half-life of a few seconds in the blood. Standard pharmaceuticals such as nitroglycerine and amyl nitrite are precursors to nitric oxide. Low levels of nitric oxide production are typically due to ischemic damage in the liver.

As a consequence of its importance in neuroscience, physiology, and immunology, nitric oxide was proclaimed "Molecule of the Year" in 1992. Research into its function led to the 1998 Nobel Prize for elucidating the role of nitric oxide as a cardiovascular signalling molecule.

== Sources ==
=== Biosynthesis ===
Platelet-derived factors, shear stress, acetylcholine, and cytokines stimulate the production of NO by endothelial nitric oxide synthase (eNOS). eNOS synthesizes NO from the terminal guanidine-nitrogen of L-arginine and oxygen and yields citrulline as a byproduct. NO production by eNOS is dependent on calcium-calmodulin and other cofactors.

Nitric oxide synthases (NOSs) synthesize the metastable free radical nitric oxide (NO). Three isoforms are known for the NOS enzyme: endothelial (eNOS), neuronal (nNOS), and inducible (iNOS) – each with separate functions. The neuronal enzyme (NOS-1) and the endothelial isoform (NOS-3) are calcium-dependent and produce low levels of this gas as a cell signaling molecule. The inducible isoform (NOS-2) is calcium-independent and produces large amounts of gas that can be cytotoxic.

NOS oxidizes the guanidine group of L-arginine in a process that consumes five electrons and results in the formation of NO with stoichiometric formation of L-citrulline. The process involves the oxidation of NADPH and the reduction of molecular oxygen. The transformation occurs at a catalytic site adjacent to a specific binding site of L-arginine. NO is an important regulator and mediator of numerous processes in the nervous, immune, and cardiovascular systems. These include vascular smooth muscle relaxation, resulting in arterial vasodilation and increasing blood flow. NO is also a neurotransmitter and has been associated with neuronal activity and various functions such as avoidance learning. NO also partially mediates macrophage cytotoxicity against microbes and tumor cells. Besides mediating normal functions, NO is implicated in pathophysiologic states as diverse as septic shock, hypertension, stroke, and neurodegenerative diseases.

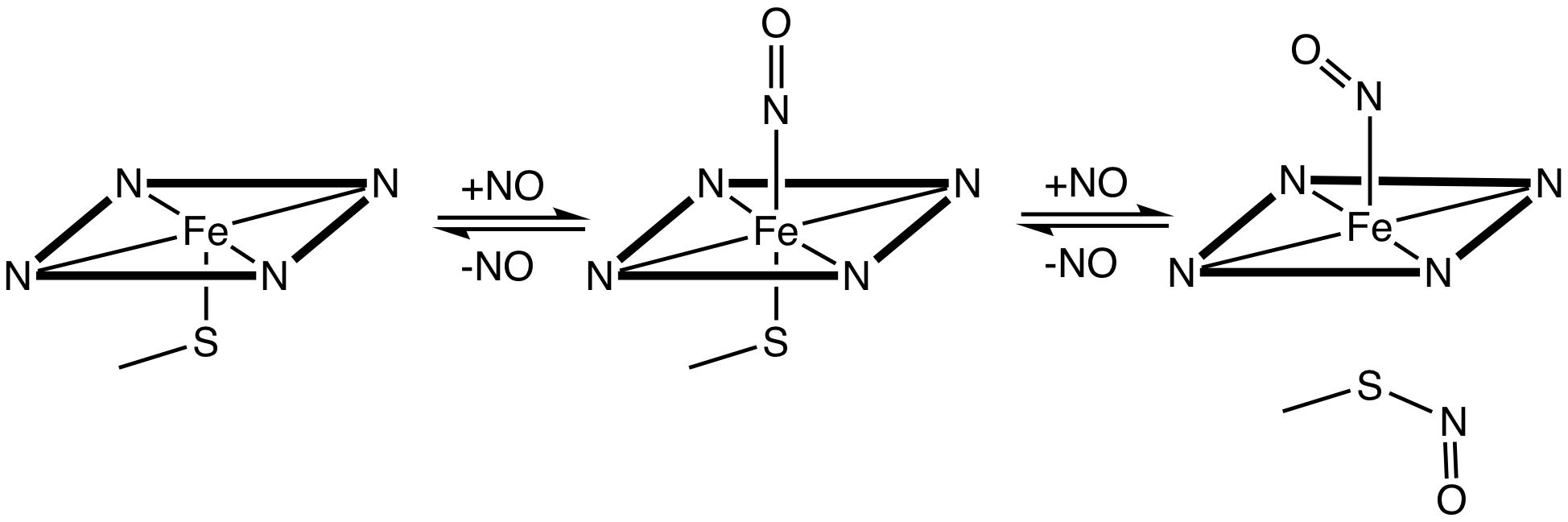
Pathway for nitrosylation of heme-thiolate, steps in cell signalling (porphyrin is depicted as the square).

=== Drugs ===
Exogenous NO sources constitute a powerful way to supplement NO when the body cannot generate enough for normal biological functions. Certain endogenous compounds can act as NO-donors or elicit NO-like reactions in vivo. Nitroglycerin and amyl nitrite serve as vasodilators because they are converted to nitric oxide in the body. The vasodilating antihypertensive drug minoxidil contains an ·NO moiety and may act as an NO agonist. Likewise, Sildenafil citrate, popularly known by the trade name Viagra, stimulates erections primarily by enhancing signaling through the nitric oxide pathway. Prominent examples are S-nitrosothiols, certain organic nitrates, nitrosylated metal complexes, dinitrosyl iron complexes (DNIC), and even nitrite anions (NO^{−}_{2}) under hypoxic conditions

A high salt intake attenuates NO production in patients with essential hypertension, although bioavailability remains unregulated.

=== Dietary ===
Dietary nitrate is also an important source of nitric oxide in mammals. Green, leafy vegetables and some root vegetables (such as beetroot) have high concentrations of nitrate. When eaten and absorbed into the bloodstream, nitrate is concentrated in saliva (about 10-fold) and is reduced to nitrite on the surface of the tongue by a biofilm of commensal facultative anaerobic bacteria. This nitrite is swallowed and reacts with acid and reducing substances in the stomach (such as ascorbate) to produce high concentrations of nitric oxide. The purpose of this mechanism to create NO is thought to be both sterilization of swallowed food (to prevent food poisoning) and to maintain gastric mucosal blood flow.

The nitrate-nitrite-nitric oxide pathway elevates nitric oxide through the sequential reduction of dietary nitrate derived from plant-based foods. Nitrate-rich vegetables, in particular leafy greens, such as spinach and arugula, and beetroot, have been shown to increase cardioprotective levels of nitric oxide with a corresponding reduction in blood pressure in pre-hypertensive persons. For the body to generate nitric oxide through the nitrate-nitrite-nitric oxide pathway, the reduction of nitrate to nitrite (by nitrate reductase, a bacterial enzyme) occurs in the mouth, by commensal bacteria, an obligatory and necessary step. Monitoring nitric oxide status by saliva testing detects the bioconversion of plant-derived nitrate into nitric oxide. A rise in salivary levels is indicative of diets rich in leafy vegetables which are often abundant in anti-hypertensive diets such as the DASH diet. Oral antiseptic mouthwash has been shown to eliminate the blood pressure lowering effects of dietary nitrate due to eradication of nitrate-reducing bacteria.

A related mechanism is thought to protect the skin from fungal infections, where nitrate in sweat is reduced to nitrite by skin commensal organisms and then to NO on the slightly acidic skin surface. In alternative fashion, nitrite anions on sun-exposed skin may be photolyzed to free nitric oxide radicals by UVA in sunlight. This mechanism may elicit significant changes to the systemic blood circulation in humans and be exploited for therapeutic purposes.

Nasal breathing also produces nitric oxide within the body.

== Biological targets ==
In cells, two broad classes of reactions of nitric oxide involve the S-nitrosation of thiols and the nitrosylation of some metalloenzymes.

=== Thiols ===
S-nitrosation involves the (reversible) conversion of thiol groups, including cysteine residues in proteins, to form S-nitrosothiols (RSNOs). S-Nitrosation is a mechanism for dynamic, post-translational regulation of most or all major classes of protein.

=== Metals ===
Nitric oxide to a transition metal ion like iron or copper, forming metal nitrosyl complexes. Typical cases involve the nitrosylation of heme proteins like cytochromes, thereby disabling the normal enzymatic activity of the enzyme. Nitrosylated ferrous iron is particularly stable. Hemoglobin is a prominent example of a heme protein that may be modified by NO by both direct attack by NO and, independently, via attack by S-nitrosothiols, involving NO transfer from S to Fe.

The iron-containing proteins ribonucleotide reductase and aconitase are deactivated by NO. NO has been demonstrated to activate NF-κB in peripheral blood mononuclear cells, Jim a transcription factor in iNOS gene expression in response to inflammation.

=== Guanylate cyclase ===
Although NO affects many metalloproteins, it does so by deactivating them.

Guanylate cyclase is a key component of the famous smooth-muscle relaxing properties of NO. It is a heme-containing enzyme that is acted on by NO, which binds to the heme. Cyclic-GMP activates protein kinase G, which causes reuptake of Ca^{2+} and the opening of calcium-activated potassium channels. The fall in concentration of Ca^{2+} ensures that the myosin light-chain kinase (MLCK) can no longer phosphorylate the myosin molecule, thereby stopping the cross-bridge cycle and leading to relaxation of the smooth muscle cell.

== Physiological effects ==
=== Vasodilation ===
Nitric oxide dilates blood vessels, raising blood supply and lowering blood pressure. Conversely, it helps protect tissues from damage due to low blood supply. Also a neurotransmitter, nitric oxide acts in the nitrergic neurons active on smooth muscle, abundant in the gastrointestinal tract and erectile tissue. Sildenafil (Viagra) works to inhibit the enzyme phosphodiesterase PDE5, which increases the cGMP concentration by inhibiting the conversion to GMP.

Nitric oxide (NO) contributes to vessel homeostasis by inhibiting vascular smooth muscle contraction and growth, platelet aggregation, and leukocyte adhesion to the endothelium. Humans with atherosclerosis, diabetes, or hypertension often show impaired NO pathways.

Nitric oxide (NO) is a mediator of vasodilation in blood vessels. It is induced by several factors, and once synthesized by eNOS it results in phosphorylation of several proteins that cause smooth muscle relaxation. The vasodilatory actions of nitric oxide play a key role in renal control of extracellular fluid homeostasis and is essential for the regulation of blood flow and blood pressure. NO also plays a role in erection of the penis and clitoris.

Nitric oxide also acts on cardiac muscle to decrease contractility and heart rate. NO contributes to the regulation of cardiac contractility. Emerging evidence suggests that coronary artery disease (CAD) is related to defects in generation or action of NO.

=== Immune response ===
A dinitrosyl iron complex (DNIC), the product from the immune responsive attack of NO on Fe-S proteins.

Nitric oxide is generated by phagocytes (monocytes, macrophages, and neutrophils) as part of the human immune response. Phagocytes are armed with inducible nitric oxide synthase (iNOS), which is activated by interferon-gamma (IFN-γ) as a single signal or by tumor necrosis factor (TNF) along with a second signal. On the other hand, transforming growth factor-beta (TGF-β) provides a strong inhibitory signal to iNOS, whereas interleukin-4 (IL-4) and IL-10 provide weak inhibitory signals. In this way, the immune system may regulate the armamentarium of phagocytes that play a role in inflammation and immune responses. Nitric oxide is secreted as free radicals in an immune response and is toxic to bacteria and intracellular parasites, including Leishmania and malaria; the mechanism for this includes DNA damage and degradation of iron sulfur centers into iron ions and iron-nitrosyl compounds.

The inducible pathway (iNOS) of nitrogen oxide synthesis in phagocytes can generate large amounts of NO that trigger apoptosis and kill other cells. In vitro studies indicate that phagocyte-dependent generation of NO at concentrations greater than 400–500 nM triggers apoptosis in nearby cells and that this effect may act in a manner similar to specialized pro-resolving mediators to dampen and reverse inflammatory responses by neutralizing and then speeding the clearance of pro-inflammatory cells from inflamed tissues. However, the role of ·NO in inflammation is complex with model studies involving viral infection suggesting that this gaseous mediator can also promote inflammation.

In response, many bacterial pathogens have evolved mechanisms for nitric oxide resistance. Because nitric oxide might serve as an inflammometer (meter of inflammation) in conditions like asthma, interest has increased in the use of exhaled nitric oxide as a breath test in diseases with airway inflammation. Reduced levels of exhaled NO have been associated with exposure to air pollution in cyclists and smokers, but, in general, levels of exhaled nitric oxide are associated with exposure to air pollution.

=== In bacteria ===
While nitric oxide is typically known to halt bacterial growth as part of an immune response, in one case NO protects a bacterium. The bacterium Deinococcus radiodurans can withstand extreme levels of radioactivity and other stresses. In 2009 it was reported that nitric oxide plays an important role in this bacteria's recovery from radiation exposure: The gas is required for division and proliferation after DNA damage has been repaired. A gene that increases nitric oxide production after UV radiation was described, and in the absence of this gene the bacteria were still able to repair DNA damage, but would not grow.

=== In plants ===
In plants, nitric oxide can be produced by any of four routes: (i) L-arginine-dependent nitric oxide synthase, (although the existence of animal NOS homologs in plants is debated), (ii) plasma membrane-bound nitrate reductase, (iii) mitochondrial electron transport chain, or (iv) non-enzymatic reactions. It is a signaling molecule, acts mainly against oxidative stress and also plays a role in plant pathogen interactions. Treating cut flowers and other plants with nitric oxide has been shown to lengthen the time before wilting.

In plants, NO also regulates some plant-pathogen interaction, promotion of the plant hypersensitive response, symbiosis (for example, with organisms in nitrogen-fixing root nodules), development of lateral and adventitious roots and root hairs, and control of stomatal opening. Nitric oxide is known to be produced by cellular organelles, including mitochondria, peroxisomes, and chloroplasts. It plays a role in antioxidant and reactive oxygen species responses.

Nitric oxide sensing in plants is mediated by the N-end rule of proteolysis and controls abiotic stress responses such as flooding-induced hypoxia, salt and drought stress.

Nitric oxide interactions have been found within signaling pathways of plant hormones such as auxin, ethylene, Abscisic acid and cytokinin.

Atmospheric nitric oxide can enter the stomates of most vascular species, and can have effects ranging from leaf blemishing, to stunting of growth, to necrosis.

=== In insects ===
Blood-sucking insects exploit vasodilation induced by NO to ensure their blood meal. These insects include Cimex lectularius (bed bug) and Rhodnius proxlixus (kissing bug). These insects deliver NO from its carrier nitrophorin, which is found in their saliva.

== As a therapeutic ==
=== Medical uses ===
Nitric oxide
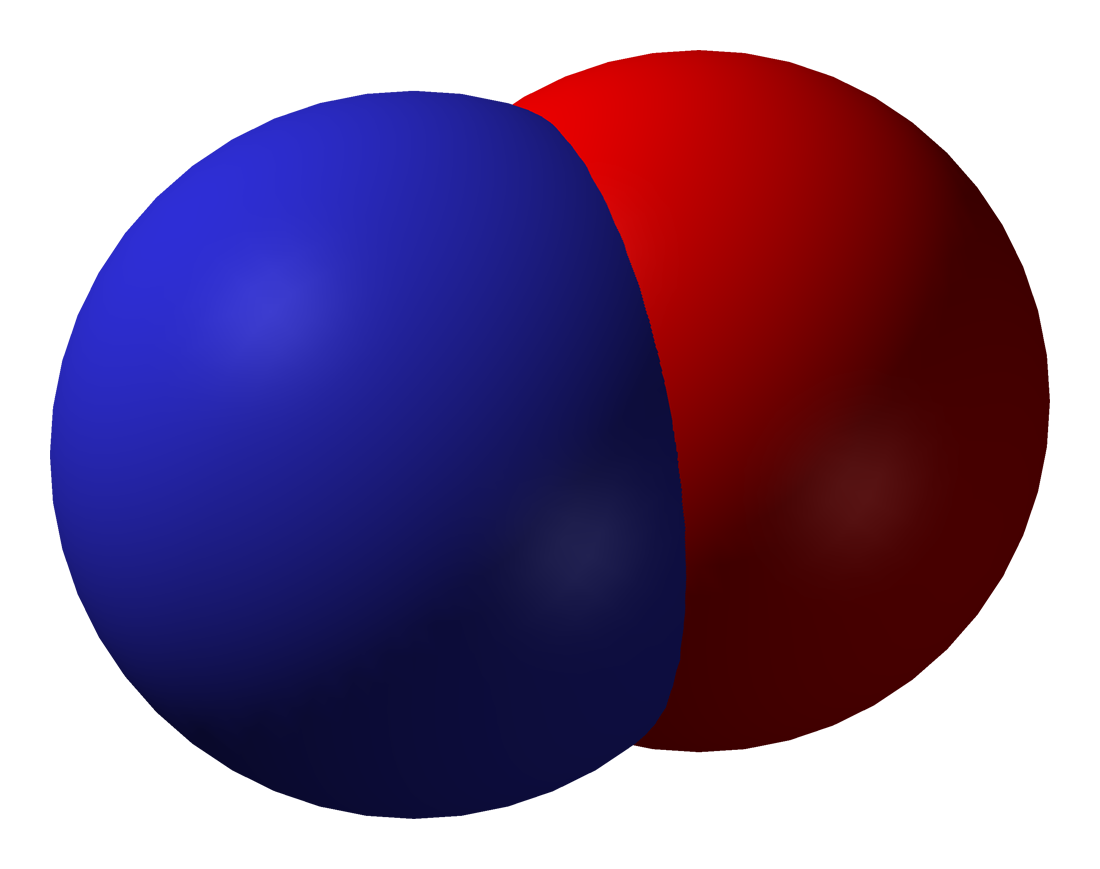

Clinical data
- Trade names: Inomax, Noxivent, Genosyl
- AHFS/Drugs.com: Monograph
- License data: EU EMA: by INN; US DailyMed: Nitric_oxide
- Pregnancy category: AU: B2
- Routes of administration: Inhalation
- ATC code: R07AX01 (WHO)

Legal status
- Legal status: AU: S4 (Prescription only); US: ℞-only; In general: ℞ (Prescription only)

Identifiers
- IUPAC name: Nitric oxide
- CAS Number: 10102-43-9
- PubChem CID: 145068
- IUPHAR/BPS: 2509
- DrugBank: DB00435
- ChemSpider: 127983
- UNII: 31C4KY9ESH
- KEGG: D00074; C00533
- ChEBI: CHEBI:16480
- ChEMBL: ChEMBL1200689

Chemical and physical data
- Formula: NO
- Molar mass: 30.006 g·mol^{−1}
- 3D model (JSmol): Interactive image
- SMILES: [N]=O
- InChI: InChI=1S/NO/c1-2; Key:MWUXSHHQAYIFBG-UHFFFAOYSA-N

In the European Union, nitric oxide in conjunction with ventilatory support and other appropriate active substances, is indicated:

- for the treatment of newborn infants ≥34 weeks gestation with hypoxic respiratory failure associated with clinical or echocardiographic evidence of pulmonary hypertension, in order to improve oxygenation and to reduce the need for extracorporeal membrane oxygenation (ECMO);
- as part of the treatment of peri- and post-operative pulmonary hypertension in adults and newborn infants, infants and toddlers, children and adolescents, ages 0–17 years in conjunction to heart surgery, in order to selectively decrease pulmonary arterial pressure and improve right ventricular function and oxygenation.

In the United States, it is indicated to improve oxygenation and reduce the need for extracorporeal membrane oxygenation in term and near-term (>34 weeks gestation) neonates with hypoxic respiratory failure associated with clinical or echocardiographic evidence of pulmonary hypertension in conjunction with ventilatory support and other appropriate agents.

The most common side effects include thrombocytopenia (low blood platelet counts), hypokalaemia (low blood potassium levels), hypotension (low blood pressure), atelectasis (collapse of the whole, or part of a, lung), and hyperbilirubinaemia (high blood levels of bilirubin).

Nitric oxide was approved for medical use in the United States in December 1999 and for medical use in the European Union in 2001.

==== Neonatal ====
Nitric oxide/oxygen blends are used in critical care to promote capillary and pulmonary dilation to treat primary pulmonary hypertension in neonatal patients and post-meconium aspiration related to birth defects. These are often a last-resort gas mixture before the use of extracorporeal membrane oxygenation (ECMO). Nitric oxide therapy has the potential to significantly increase the quality of life and, in some cases, save the lives of infants at risk for pulmonary vascular disease.

==== Pediatric and adult ====
The primary use is in the form of nitroglycerin, either pill or liquid spray forms, which, as a prodrug, is denitrated and releases the active metabolite nitric oxide (NO). As with all supplements of nitric oxide, the response is short-lived because, as a normally produced internal physiologic control mechanism, increased concentrations lead to increased rates of clearance, which is the reason that the effectiveness of sustained use of nitroglycerin for vasodilation fades to none after hours to days. In the United States, ongoing direct use of nitric oxide use is only approved for neonates. In the adult ICU setting, inhaled ·NO can improve hypoxemia in acute lung injury, acute respiratory distress syndrome, and severe pulmonary hypertension, although the effects are short-lived and there are no studies demonstrating improved clinical outcomes. It is used on an individualized basis in ICUs as an adjunct to other definitive therapies for reversible causes of hypoxemic respiratory distress.

==== Pulmonary embolism ====
Nitric oxide is also administered as salvage therapy in patients with acute right ventricular failure secondary to pulmonary embolism.

==== Veterinary ====
Nitric oxide can be delivered as a pulse in the beginning of each breath to horses during anaesthesia. This is called PiNO (pulsed inhaled nitric oxide) and results in better matching of ventilation and perfusion and thereby improves the arterial oxygenation.

=== Dosage and strength ===
In the United States, nitric oxide is a gas available in concentrations of only 100 ppm and 800 ppm. Overdosage with inhaled nitric oxide will be seen by elevations in methemoglobin and pulmonary toxicities associated with inspired ·NO. Elevated NO may cause acute lung injury.

=== Contraindications ===
Inhaled nitric oxide is contraindicated in the treatment of neonates known to be dependent on right-to-left shunting of blood. This is as the nitric oxide decreases the pulmonary circulation's resistance by dilating pulmonary blood vessels. The increased pulmonary return increases pressure in the left atrium, causing closure of the foramen ovale and reducing the blood flow through the ductus arteriosus. Closing these shunts can kill neonates with heart malformations that rely on the right-to-left shunting of blood.

=== Side effects ===
There are some associated complaints with utilization of nitric oxide in neonatal patients. Some of them include dose errors associated with the delivery system, headaches associated with environmental exposure of nitric oxide in hospital staff, hypotension associated with acute withdrawal of the drug, hypoxemia associated with acute withdrawal of the drug, and pulmonary edema in patients with CREST syndrome.

=== Pharmacology ===
==== Pharmacokinetics ====
Nitric oxide is absorbed systemically after inhalation. Most of it moves across the pulmonary capillary bed where it combines with hemoglobin that is 60% to 100% oxygen-saturated.

Nitrate has been identified as the predominant nitric oxide metabolite excreted in the urine, accounting for >70% of the nitric oxide dose inhaled. Nitrate is cleared from the plasma by the kidney at rates approaching the rate of glomerular filtration.

==== Pharmacodynamics ====
Nitric oxide is a cell signaling molecule produced by many cells of the body, and growing evidence suggests that the biological actions of the endocannabinoid system (ECS) may, in part, be mediated through its ability to regulate the production and/or release of nitric oxide. It relaxes vascular smooth muscle by binding to the heme moiety of cytosolic guanylate cyclase, activating guanylate cyclase and increasing intracellular levels of cyclic-guanosine 3',5'-monophosphate (cGMP). The elevation of intracellular cGMP results in relaxation by the activation of cGMP-dependent protein kinase, which phosphorylates target proteins such as the myosin phosphatase-targeting subunit (MYPT) and the IP3 receptor-associated cGMP kinase substrate (IRAG). In addition, cGMP has been proposed to also cause smooth muscle relaxation indirectly by increasing levels of cAMP.

When inhaled, nitric oxide dilates the pulmonary vasculature and, because of efficient scavenging by hemoglobin, has minimal effect on the vasculature of the entire body.

Inhaled nitric oxide appears to increase the partial pressure of arterial oxygen (P_{a}O_{2}) by dilating pulmonary vessels in better-ventilated areas of the lung, moving pulmonary blood flow away from lung segments with low ventilation/perfusion (V/Q) ratios toward segments with normal or better ratios.

Nitric oxide is considered an antianginal drug: It causes vasodilation, which can help with ischemic pain, known as angina, by decreasing the cardiac workload. By dilating (expanding) the arteries, nitric oxide drugs lower arterial pressure and left ventricular filling pressure. Nitric oxide can contribute to reperfusion injury when an excessive amount produced during reperfusion (following a period of ischemia) reacts with superoxide to produce the damaging oxidant peroxynitrite. In contrast, inhaled nitric oxide has been shown to help survival and recovery from paraquat poisoning, which produces lung tissue-damaging superoxide and hinders NOS metabolism.

This vasodilation does not decrease the volume of blood the heart pumps, but rather it decreases the force the heart muscle must exert to pump the same volume of blood. Nitroglycerin pills, taken sublingually (under the tongue), are used to prevent or treat acute chest pain. The nitroglycerin reacts with a sulfhydryl group (–SH) to produce nitric oxide, which eases the pain by causing vasodilation. There is a potential role for the use of nitric oxide in alleviating bladder contractile dysfunctions, and recent evidence suggests that nitrates may be beneficial for treatment of angina due to reduced myocardial oxygen consumption both by decreasing preload and afterload and by some direct vasodilation of coronary vessels.

== Pathology ==
People with diabetes usually have lower levels of nitric oxide than patients without diabetes. Diminished supply of nitric oxide can lead to vascular damage, such as endothelial dysfunction and vascular inflammation. Vascular damage can lead to decreased blood flow to the extremities, causing the diabetic patient to be more likely to develop neuropathy and non-healing ulcers, and to be at a greater risk for lower limb amputation.

=== Fatty liver disease ===
Nitric oxide production is associated with nonalcoholic fatty liver disease (NAFLD) and is essential for hepatic lipid metabolism under starvation.

=== Lung infection ===
Nitric oxide is a potential therapeutic intervention in acute and chronic lung infections.

== Research ==
=== COVID-19 ===
As of April 2020, studies and trials are underway that examine the possible benefits of nitric oxide in the treatment of COVID-19. This research is based on the fact that nitric oxide was investigated as an experimental therapy for SARS. Brian Strickland, MD, a fellow in Wilderness Medicine at Massachusetts General Hospital who studies "acute respiratory distress" in high altitudes, is applying this research towards COVID-19. He is involved in clinical trials which apply the use of inhaled nitric oxide as a treatment for COVID-19. This approach was inspired by the work of associate professor of emergency medicine at the Harvard Medical School N. Stuart Harris, who has been studying the effects of altitude sickness on mountain climbers, such as those who climb Mount Everest. Harris noticed that the consequences of high level altitude sickness on the human body mirrored COVID-19's dysfunctional impact on the lungs. His focus on nitric oxide comes from its role in being able to breathe in high altitudes. According to WCVB-TV, similar trials are being conducted at Tufts Medical Center. Other studies speculate that replacing mouth breathing (which reduces NO) with nasal breathing (which increases NO) is a "lifestyle change" that "may also help to reduce SARS-CoV-2 viral load and symptoms of COVID‑19 pneumonia by promoting more efficient antiviral defense mechanisms in the respiratory tract."

=== Cardiac protection ===
It is found, that the naturally occurring cannabinoid compound delta-9-tetrahydrocannabinol (THC: C_{21}H_{30}O_{2}), appearing in Cannabis, increase NO production in neonatal cardiac cells through the induction of the inducible nitric oxide synthase (iNOS) activity in a CB2 receptor dependent manner, while increasing endothelial nitric oxide synthase (eNOS) expression in diabetic hearts subject to ischaemia/reperfusion (I/R), thereby protecting cardiac cells from hypoxic damage, probably by pre-training the cardiomyocytes to hypoxic conditions, as an NOS inhibitor was able to block the THC-induced cardioprotective action. The activation of mainly CB2 receptors and the restoration of iNOS/eNOS cardiac equilibrium are mechanisms involved in this protective effect of cannabinoids.
