= Nitrosylruthenium(II) nitrate =

- Structure of mer-RuNO(NH_{3})_{2}(NO_{3})_{3}

Names
- IUPAC name azanylidyneoxidanium;ruthenium(2+);trinitrate
- Other names: Trinitratonitrosylruthenium(II)

Identifiers
CAS Number	34513-98-9
3D model (JSmol)	Interactive image
ChemSpider	148332
ECHA InfoCard	100.047.320
EC Number	252-068-8
PubChem CID	169615
CompTox Dashboard (EPA)	DTXSID70956040
- InChI: InChI=1S/3NO3.NO.Ru/c3*2-1(3)4;1-2;/q3*-1;+1;+2 Key: WOSOOWIGVAKGOC-UHFFFAOYSA-N
- SMILES: N#[O+].[N+](=O)([O-])[O-].[N+](=O)([O-])[O-].[N+](=O)([O-])[O-].[Ru+2]

Properties
Chemical formula	Ru(NO)(NO_{3})_{3}
Molar mass	317.09 g/mol
Appearance	Red-brown solid
Solubility in water	Soluble, slow hydrolysis
Solubility	Soluble in nitric acid and various organic solvents

Hazards
- GHS labelling
Pictograms	(GHS03: Oxidizing) (GHS05: Corrosive) (GHS09: Environmental hazard)
Signal word	Danger
Hazard statements	H271, H290, H314, H411
Precautionary statements	P210, P220, P234, P260, P264, P264+P265, P273, P280, P283, P301+P330+P331, P302+P361+P354, P304+P340, P305+P354+P338, P306+P360, P316, P317, P321, P363, P370+P378, P371+P380+P375, P390, P391, P405, P420, P501
NFPA 704 (fire diamond)	2 0 0 OX
- Except where otherwise noted, data are given for materials in their standard state (at 25 °C [77 °F], 100 kPa). Infobox references

Nitrosylruthenium(II) nitrate refers to a group of mostly ill-defined inorganic metal nitrosyl complexes with the general formula Ru(NO)L_{x}(NO_{3})_{y}, where L is a ligand. They are all orange or red amorphous and glassy solids. The only well-characterized simple nitrosylruthenium(II) trinitrate is the diammine complex, RuNO(NH_{3})_{2}(NO_{3})_{3}, which is a yellow crystalline solid.

== History ==
The first nitrosylruthenium compound to be prepared was the 'chloride' (formulated Ru(NO)Cl_{3}), first prepared by Karl Ernst Claus in 1844 while isolating and purifying ruthenium, but was wrongly identified as the chloro-ruthenate (K_{2}RuCl_{6}) by Jöns Jacob Berzelius due to the similar molecular weight of chloride (MW = 35.45) and nitrosyl (MW = 30.00). It was later correctly characterized by Antoine Joly in 1888, who also produced the 'hydroxide', which he formulated as (RuNO)_{2}O_{3}·2H_{2}O.

Nitrate derivatives, however, were not identified until 1955. They were all produced by dissolving the 'hydroxide' in nitric acid, then evaporating the solution. Various ill-defined hydrates and basic solids have been reported.

== Structure ==
The solid commercially available as nitrosylruthenium(II) nitrate, nominally Ru(NO)(NO_{3})_{3}, is a red-colored ill-defined mixture with the approximate formula Ru(NO)(NO_{3})_{2.13}(OH)_{0.87}(H_{2}O)_{2}. Other simple nitrosylruthenium(II) nitrates are also not structurally characterized. This is likely due to the polymerization of nitratoaqua complexes via the OH and NO_{3} bridging groups.

The only structurally characterized simple nitrosylruthenium(II) trinitrate through single-crystal X-ray diffraction is the diammine complex, RuNO(NH_{3})_{2}(NO_{3})_{3}. It consists of repeating distorted mer-[Ru(NO)(NH_{3})_{2}(NO_{3})_{3}] octahedra and crystallises in an orthorhombic crystal structure. However, the ruthenium centers are in two slightly different environments due to the different torsion angles between the two trans-coordinated nitrate anions. In the complex, the nitrosyl is N-bonded with a ~180° Ru-N-O bond angle signalling the presence of the NO^{+} cation.

The fac isomer of the diammine complex has also been reported, but the structure has not been fully elucidated.

== Preparation and properties ==
The simple 'nitrosylruthenium(II) nitrate' is prepared by the reaction of ruthenium(III) chloride and nitrous acid, followed by the precipitation of the 'hydroxide', formulated "Ru(NO)(OH)_{3}". The 'hydroxide' is then treated with nitric acid to yield the 'hydrated nitrosylruthenium(II) nitrate'. Heating to hydrate to 100 °C produces the 'anhydrous Ru(NO)(NO_{3})_{3}'.

It is soluble in various organic solvents, such as diethyl ether and methyl ethyl ketone. This property has been investigated for the solvent extraction of radioactive ruthenium from nitric acid solutions. It is also soluble in water, but slowly undergoes hydrolysis.

'Nitrosylruthenium(II) nitrate' decomposes to ruthenium(IV) oxide at around 250 °C. It also reacts with various acids, such as oxalic acid, sulfuric acid, and hydrofluoric acid to produce other ill-defined nitrosylruthenium salts.

Silicon dioxide-deposited 'nitrosylruthenium(II) nitrate' forms triruthenium dodecacarbonyl when heated under carbon monoxide.

The preparation of the well-defined RuNO(NH_{3})_{2}(NO_{3})_{3} is more complicated. First, ammonium pentachloronitrosoruthenate (produced from the reaction of ruthenium(III) chloride, sodium nitrite, and nitric acid in hydrochloric acid) is heated to 330 °C:

(NH_{4})_{2}[Ru(NO)Cl_{5}] → [Ru(NO)(NH_{3})_{2}Cl_{3}] + 2HCl↑

Then the resulting complex is reacted with an aqueous sodium nitrite solution:

2 Ru(NO)(NH_{3})_{2}Cl_{3} + 7 NaNO_{2} + H_{2}O → 2 RuNO(NH_{3})_{2}(NO_{2})_{2}OH + 6NaCl + NaNO_{3} + 2NO↑

Finally, RuNO(NH_{3})_{2}(NO_{2})_{2}OH is reacted with concentrated nitric acid to yield diamminenitrosylruthenium(II) nitrate as the mer isomer. It is a yellow crystalline solid poorly soluble in water, ethanol, and acetone.

== Other complexes ==
Name	Formula	Molar mass (g/mol)	Crystal system	Space group	Unit cell (Å)	Cell volume (Å^{3})	Density (g/cm^{3})	Note	Reference
Diamminenitrosylruthenium(II) nitrate	mer-[Ru(NO)(NH_{3})_{2}(NO_{3})_{3}]	351.15	Orthorhombic	P2_{1}2_{1}2_{1}	a = 7.64 b = 10.84 c = 24.03; Z = 8	1991	2.338	yellow solid	
Tetraamminenitratonitrosylruthenium nitrate	trans-[RuNO(NH_{3})_{4}(NO_{3})](NO_{3})_{2}	385.21	Tetragonal	I4̅	a = 7.82, c = 9.78	598	2.139	yellow-orange solid	
Tetraamminenitratonitrosylruthenium nitrate	trans-[RuNO(NH_{3})_{4}(NO_{3})](NO_{3})_{2}	385.21	Monoclinic	Cm	a = 11.56, b = 7.99, c = 7.79, β = 127.1°	574	2.230		
Aquatetraamminenitrosylruthenium nitrate	trans-[RuNO(NH_{3})_{4}(H_{2}O)](NO_{3})_{3}	403.23	Tetragonal	I4_{1}/a	a = 18.28, c = 15.13	5055	2.119		
	[RuNO(NH_{3})_{2}(H_{2}O)(NO_{3})_{2}]NO_{3}·H_{2}O	387.18	Monoclinic	P2_{1}	a = 6.63, b = 13.44, c = 7.02, β = 114.3°	570	2.256		
	cis-[RuNO(NH_{3})_{2}Py_{2}(NO_{3})](NO_{3})_{2}·H_{2}O	527.39	Triclinic	P1̅	a = 9.70, b = 9.81, c = 10.67, α = 97.4°, β = 102.7°, γ = 95.57°		1.797		
	RuNO(Py)_{2}(NO_{3})_{3}	475.31	Monoclinic	P2_{1}/c	a = 8.92, b = 12.28, c = 15.91, β = 94.4°	1737	1.638		
