= George Santos (disambiguation) =

George Santos (born 1988), a former member of the U.S. House of Representatives.

George Santos may also refer to:

- George W. Santos (1909–2001), American medical school professor

== See also ==
- Georges Santos (born 1970), Cape Verdean footballer
- George (footballer, born 1978), or George dos Santos Paladini, Brazilian footballer
