= Dinitrosyl iron complex =

Structure of a dinitrosyliron complex (DNIC)

In biochemistry, dinitrosyl iron complexes (DNIC's) are coordination complexes with the formula [Fe(NO)_{2}(SR)_{2}]^{−}. Together with Roussin esters (Fe_{2}(NO)_{4}(SR)_{2}), they result from the degradation of iron-sulfur proteins by nitric oxide. Commonly the thiolate ligands are cysteinyl residues or glutathione. These metal nitrosyl complexes have attracted much attention because they serve as biochemical signals in response to oxidative stress, manifested in the formation of NO. The anions are tetrahedral.
