= Metal nitrosyl complex =

Chemical compound of a transition metal and nitric oxide

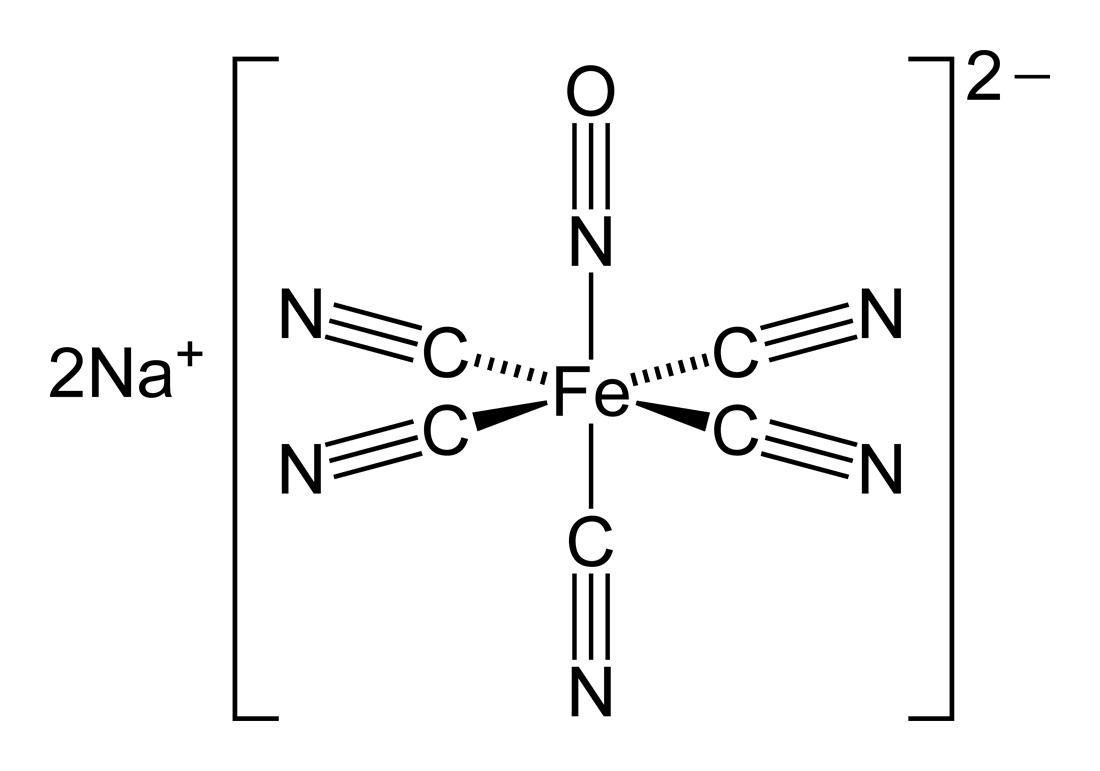
Sodium nitroprusside, a medicinally significant metal nitrosyl-pentacyanoferrate (Fe^{II}) compound, used to treat hypertension.

Metal nitrosyl complexes are complexes that contain nitric oxide, NO, bonded to a transition metal. Many kinds of nitrosyl complexes are known, which vary both in structure and coligand.

== Structure, bonding, spectroscopy ==
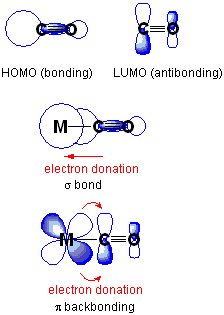
(Top) the HOMO and LUMO of CO. (Middle) Sigma bond. (Bottom) Back-bond.

Most complexes containing the NO ligand can be viewed as derivatives of the nitrosyl cation, NO^{+}. The nitrosyl cation is isoelectronic with carbon monoxide, thus the bonding between a nitrosyl ligand and a metal follows the same principles as the bonding in carbonyl complexes. The nitrosyl cation serves as a two-electron donor to the metal and accepts electrons from the metal via back-bonding. The compounds Co(NO)(CO)_{3} and Ni(CO)_{4} illustrate the analogy between NO^{+} and CO. In an electron-counting sense, two linear NO ligands are equivalent to three CO groups. This trend is illustrated by the isoelectronic pair Fe(CO)_{2}(NO)_{2} and [Ni(CO)_{4}]. These complexes are isoelectronic and, incidentally, both obey the 18-electron rule. The formal description of nitric oxide as NO^{+} does not match certain measureable and calculated properties. In an alternative description, nitric oxide serves as a 3-electron donor, and the metal-nitrogen interaction has multiple bond character.

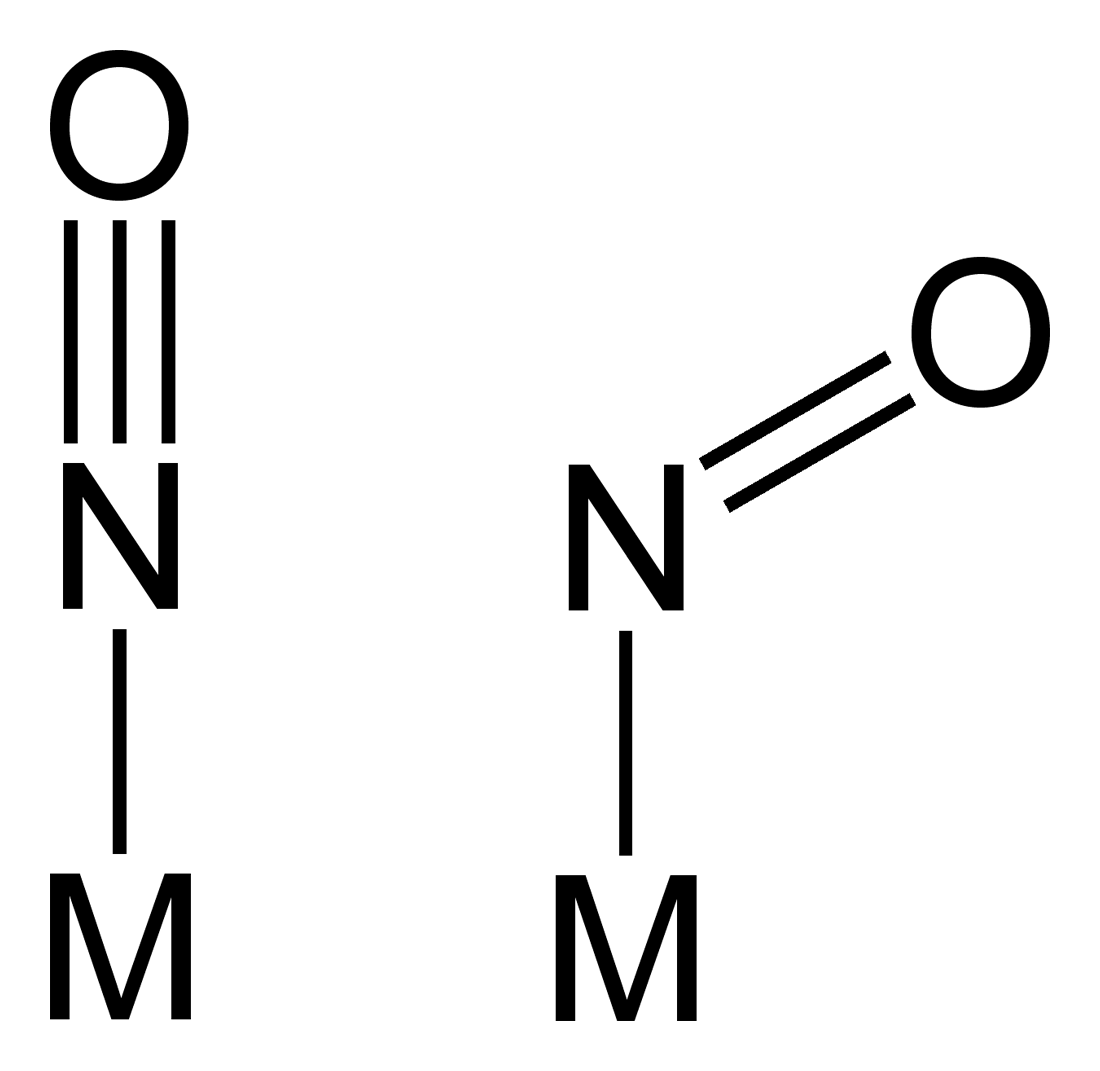
linear and bent M-NO bonds

=== Linear vs bent nitrosyl ligands ===
The M-N-O unit in nitrosyl complexes is usually within 15° of linearity. In some complexes, however, especially when back-bonding is less important, the M-N-O angle can strongly deviate from 180°.

The bent NO ligand is sometimes described as the anion, NO^{−}. Prototypes for such compounds are the organic nitroso compounds, such as nitrosobenzene. A complex with a bent NO ligand is trans-[Co(en)_{2}(NO)Cl]^{+}. The NO^{−} description is also common for alkali-metal or alkaline-earth metal-NO molecules. For example, LiNO is Li^{+}NO^{−}.

The adoption of linear vs bent bonding can be analyzed with the Enemark-Feltham notation. In their framework, the factor that determines the bent vs linear NO ligands is the electron count in the metal-N-O π system. According to this analysis, complexes {MNO}^{n}, where n > 6, will have bent geometries at N. Thus, [Co(en)_{2}(NO)Cl]^{+}, with eight electrons of pi-symmetry, i.e. {CoNO}^{8}, adopts a bent NO ligand, whereas [Fe(CN)_{5}(NO)]^{2−}, with six electrons of pi-symmetry, {FeNO}^{6}, adopts a linear nitrosyl. In a further illustration, consider the {MNO} d-electron count of the [Cr(CN)_{5}NO]^{3−} anion. In this example, the cyanide ligands are "innocent", i.e., they have a charge of −1 each, −5 total. To balance the fragment's overall charge, the charge on {CrNO} is thus +2 (−3 = −5 + 2). Using the neutral electron counting scheme, Cr has 6 d electrons and NO· has one electron for a total of 7. Two electrons are subtracted to take into account that fragment's overall charge of +2, to give 5. Written in the Enemark-Feltham notation, the d electron count is {CrNO}^{5}, and the nitrosyl is linear. The results are the same if the nitrosyl ligand were considered NO^{+} or NO^{−}.

=== Spectroscopy ===
Linear and bent NO ligands can often be distinguished using infrared spectroscopy. The vibration ν_{NO} for linear M-N-O groups occurs in the range 1650–1900 cm^{−1} and is intense. For bent nitrosyls, ν_{NO} falls in the range 1525–1690 cm^{−1}. The differing vibrational frequencies reflect the differing N-O bond orders for linear (triple bond) and bent NO (double bond).

^{15}N NMR measurements have been reported for many metal nitrosyls.

=== Bridging nitrosyl ligands ===
Nitric oxide can also serve as a bridging ligand. In the compound [Mn_{3}(η^{5}-C_{5}H_{5})_{3}(μ_{2}-NO)_{3}(μ_{3}-NO)], three NO groups bridge two metal centres and one NO group bridges to all three.

=== Isonitrosyl ligands ===
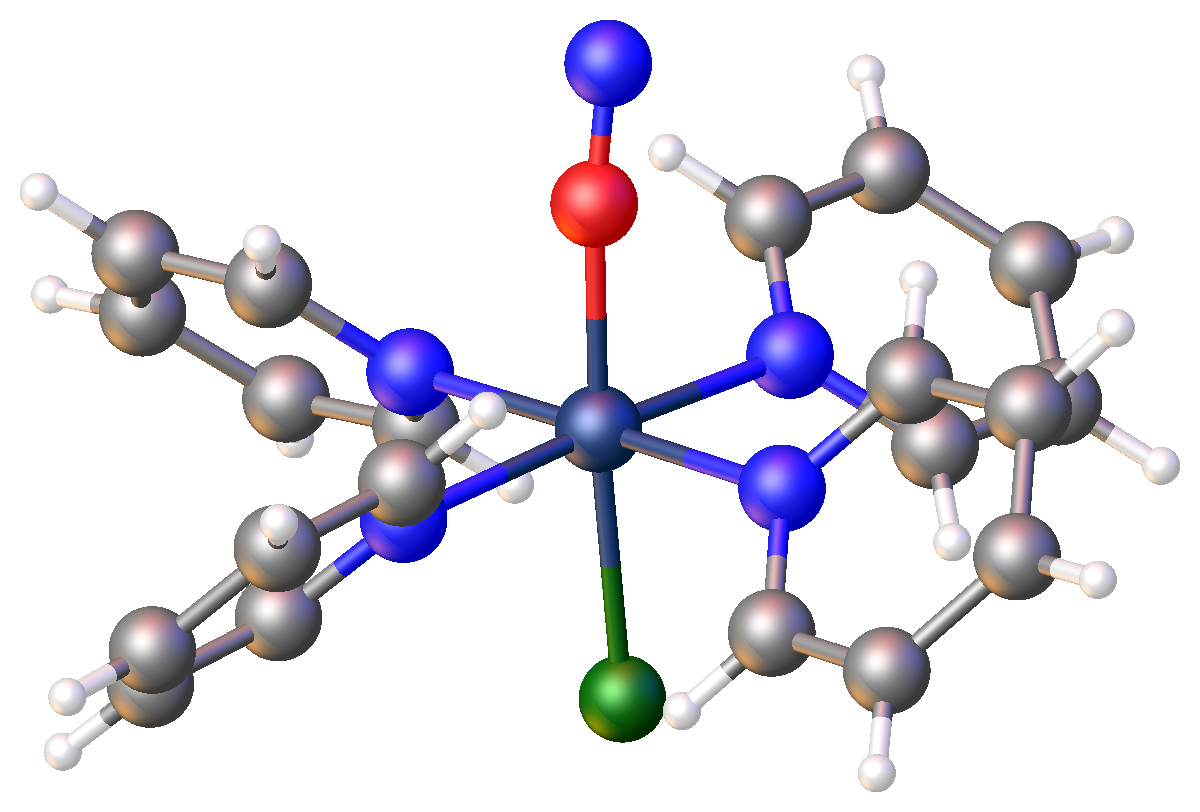
Structure of the isonitrosyl complex [Ru(Cl)(ON)(pyridine)_{4}]^{+} (color code: red (O), blue (N), gray (C), dark green (Ru), green (Cl)).

Usually only of transient existence, complexes of isonitrosyl ligands are known where the NO is coordinated by its oxygen atom. They can be generated by UV-irradiation of nitrosyl complexes.

== Representative classes of compounds ==
=== Homoleptic nitrosyl complexes ===
Metal complexes containing only nitrosyl ligands are called homoleptic nitrosyls. They are rare, the premier member being Cr(NO)_{4}. Even trinitrosyl complexes are uncommon, whereas polycarbonyl complexes are routine.

=== Roussin red and black salts ===
One of the earliest examples of a nitrosyl complex to be synthesized is Roussin's red salt, which is a sodium salt of the anion [Fe_{2}(NO)_{4}S_{2}]^{2−}. The structure of the anion can be viewed as consisting of two tetrahedra sharing an edge. Each iron atom is bonded linearly to two NO^{+} ligands and shares two bridging sulfido ligands with the other iron atom. Roussin's black salt has a more complex cluster structure. The anion in this species has the formula [Fe_{4}(NO)_{7}S_{3}]^{−}. It has C_{3v} symmetry. It consists of a tetrahedron of iron atoms with sulfide ions on three faces of the tetrahedron. Three iron atoms are bonded to two nitrosyl groups. The iron atom on the threefold symmetry axis has a single nitrosyl group which also lies on that axis.

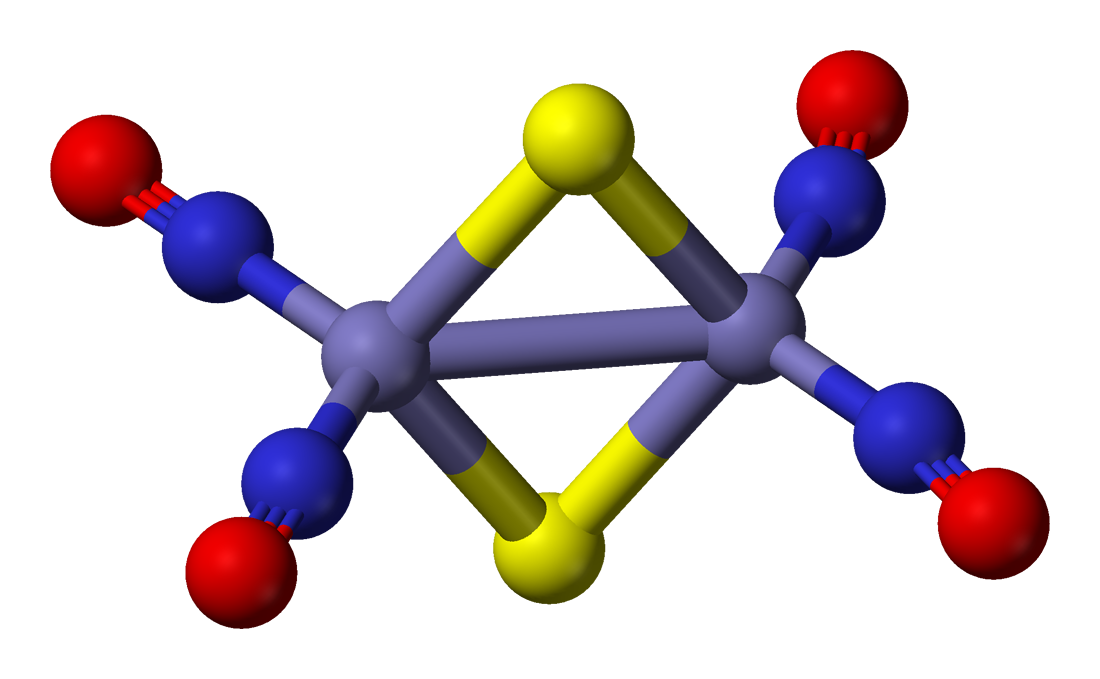
The anion in Roussin's red salt, [Fe_{2}S_{2}(NO)_{4}]^{2−}.

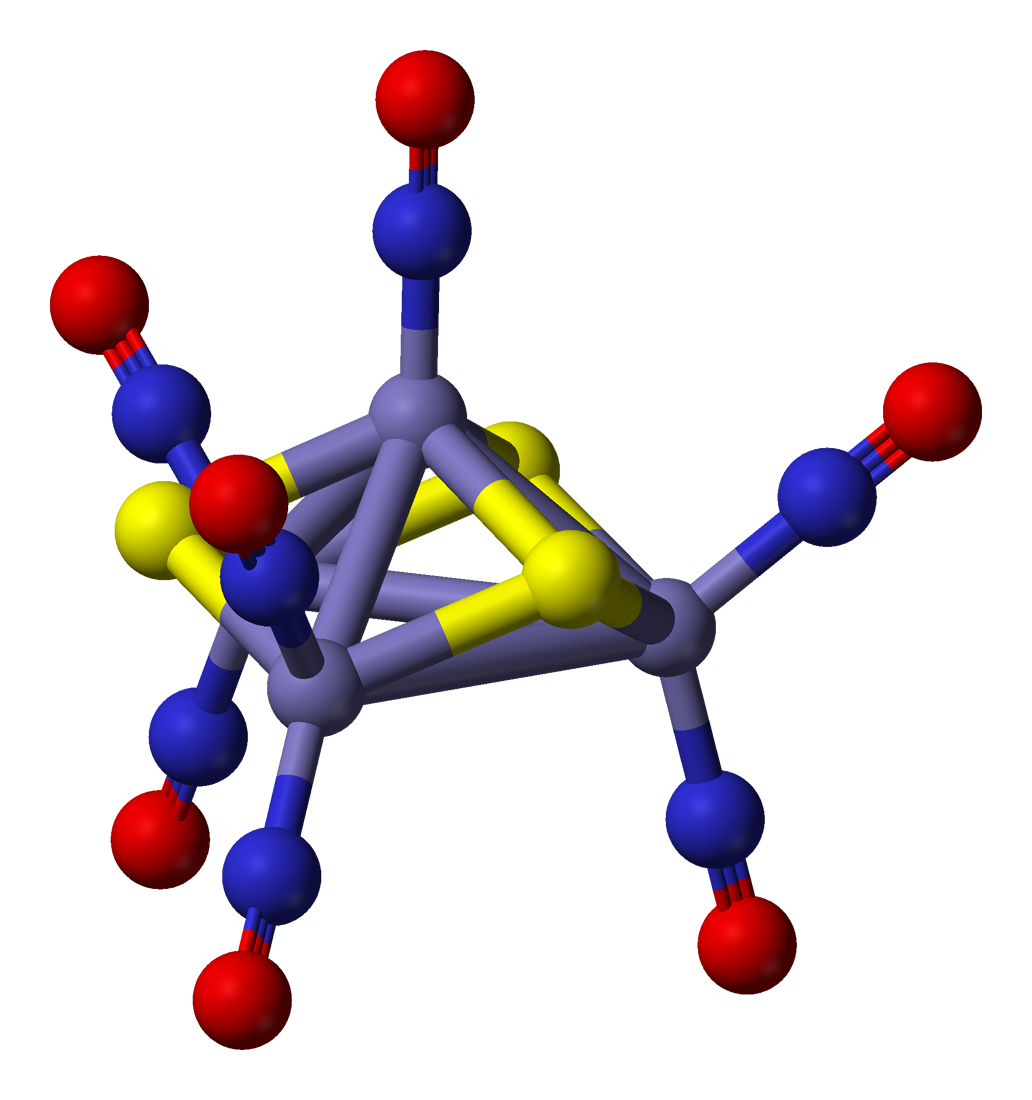
The anion in Roussin's black salt, [Fe_{4}S_{3}(NO)_{7}]^{−}.

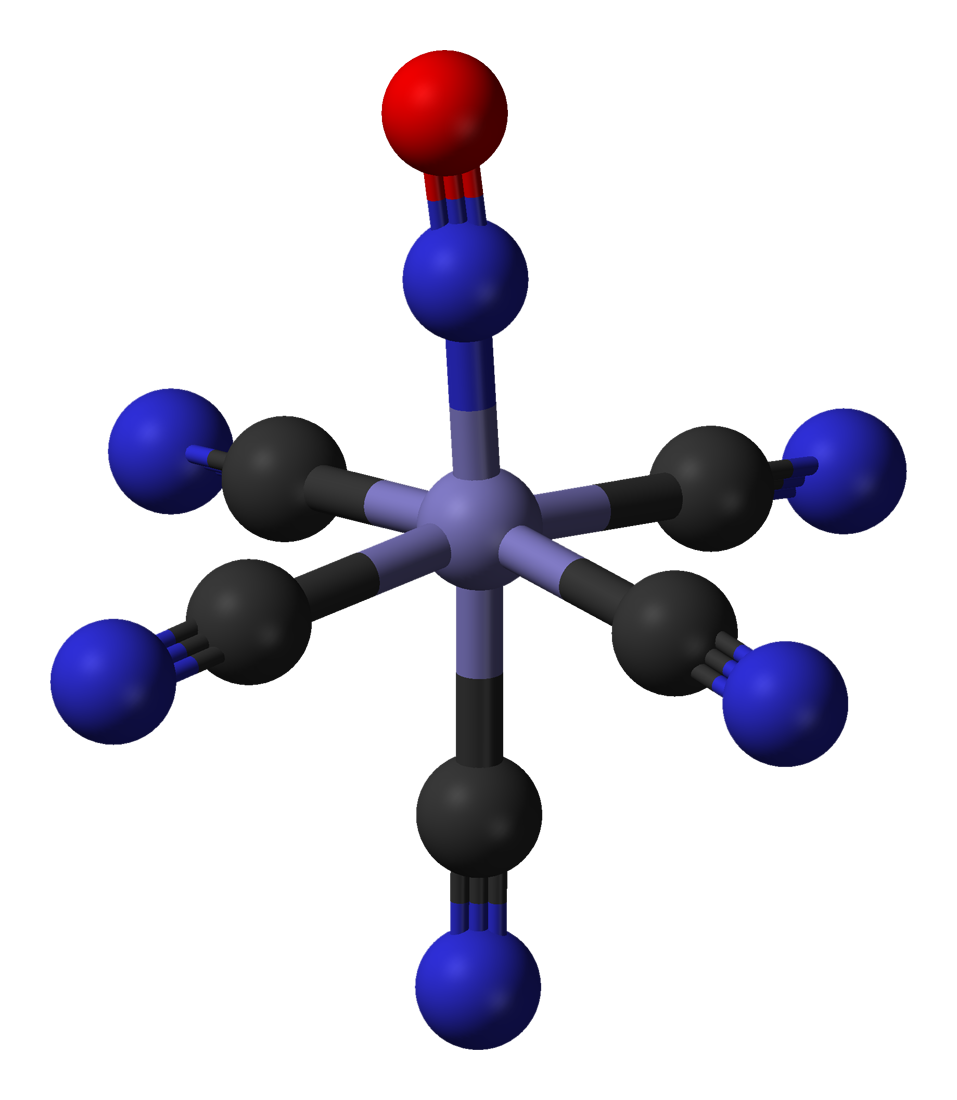
The nitroprusside anion, [Fe(CN)_{5}NO]^{2−}, an octahedral complex containing a "linear NO" ligand.

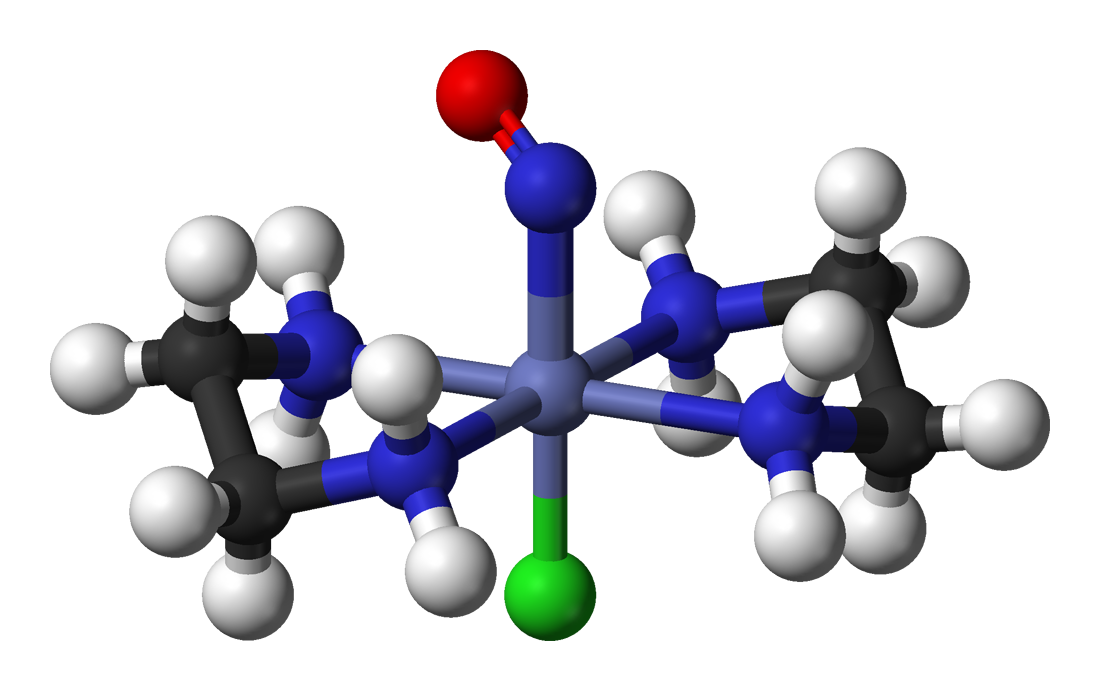
trans-[Co(en)_{2}(NO)Cl]^{+}, an octahedral complex containing a "bent NO" ligand.

== Preparation ==
Many nitrosyl complexes are quite stable, thus many methods can be used for their synthesis.

=== From NO ===
Nitrosyl complexes are traditionally prepared by treating metal complexes with nitric oxide. The method is mainly used with reduced precursors. Illustrative is the nitrosylation of cobalt carbonyl to give cobalt tricarbonyl nitrosyl:

Co_{2}(CO)_{8} + 2 NO → 2 CoNO(CO)_{3} + 2 CO

Alternatively, the cobalt may be reduced in situ:

2 CoX_{2} + Zn + 4 NO→ Co_{2}(NO)_{4}X_{2} + ZnX_{2}

where X is Cl, Br, or I.

=== From NO^{+} sources ===
Replacement of ligands by the nitrosyl cation may be accomplished using nitrosyl tetrafluoroborate. This reagent has been applied to the hexacarbonyls of molybdenum and tungsten:

M(CO)_{6} + 4 MeCN + 2 NOBF_{4} → [M(NO)_{2}(MeCN)_{4}](BF_{4})_{2} + 6 CO

Nitrosyl chloride and molybdenum hexacarbonyl react to give [Mo(NO)_{2}Cl_{2}]_{n}. Diazald is also used as an NO source.

Simple nitrite salts also oxidize metal carbonyls to the corresponding nitrosyl, i.e.:

Fe(CO)_{5} + KNO_{2} → K[Fe(CO)_{3}NO] + CO + CO_{2}

=== From hydroxylamine ===
Hydroxylamine is a source of nitric oxide anion via a disproportionation:

K_{2}[Ni(CN)_{4}] + 2 NH_{2}OH + KOH → K_{2}[Ni(CN)_{3}NO] + NH_{3} + 2 H_{2}O + KCN

=== From nitric acid ===
Nitric acid is a source of nitric oxide complexes, although the details are obscure. Probably relevant is the conventional self-dehydration of nitric acid:

2 HNO_{3} → NO_{2}^{+}NO_{3}^{−} + H_{2}O

Nitric acid is used in some preparations of nitroprusside from ferrocyanide:

HNO_{3} + [Fe(CN)_{6}]^{4-} → [Fe(CN)_{5}(NO)]^{2-} + OH^{−} + OCN^{−}

=== From nitrite complexes ===
Some anionic nitrito complexes undergo acid-induced deoxygenation to give the linear nitrosyl complex.

[L_{n}MNO_{2}]^{−} + 2 H^{+} → [L_{n}MNO]^{+} + H_{2}O

The reaction is reversible in some cases.

=== Oxidation of ammine complexes ===
In some metal-ammine complexes, the ammonia ligand can be oxidized to nitrosyl:

H_{2}O + [Ru(terpy)(bipy)(NH_{3})]^{2+} → [Ru(terpy)(bipy)(NO)]^{3+} + 5 H^{+} + 6 e^{−}

== Reactions ==
An important reaction is the acid/base equilibrium, yielding transition metal nitrite complexes:

[L_{n}MNO]^{2+} + 2OH^{−} ⇌ L_{n}MNO_{2} + H_{2}O

This equilibrium serves to confirm that the linear nitrosyl ligand is, formally, NO^{+}, with nitrogen in the oxidation state +3

NO^{+} + 2 OH^{−} ⇌ NO_{2}^{−} + H_{2}O

Since nitrogen is more electronegative than carbon, metal-nitrosyl complexes tend to be more electrophilic than related metal carbonyl complexes. Nucleophiles often add to the nitrogen.

The nitrogen atom in bent metal nitrosyls is basic, thus can be oxidized, alkylated, and protonated, e.g.:

OsCl(PPh_{3})_{2}(CO)(NO) + HCl → OsCl_{2}(PPh_{3})_{2}(CO)(HNO)

In rare cases, NO is cleaved by metal centers as illustrated by this niobocene chemistry:

Cp_{2}NbMe_{2} + NO → Cp_{2}(Me)Nb(O)NMe
2 Cp_{2}(Me)Nb(O)NMe → 2 Cp_{2}Nb(O)Me + MeN=NMe

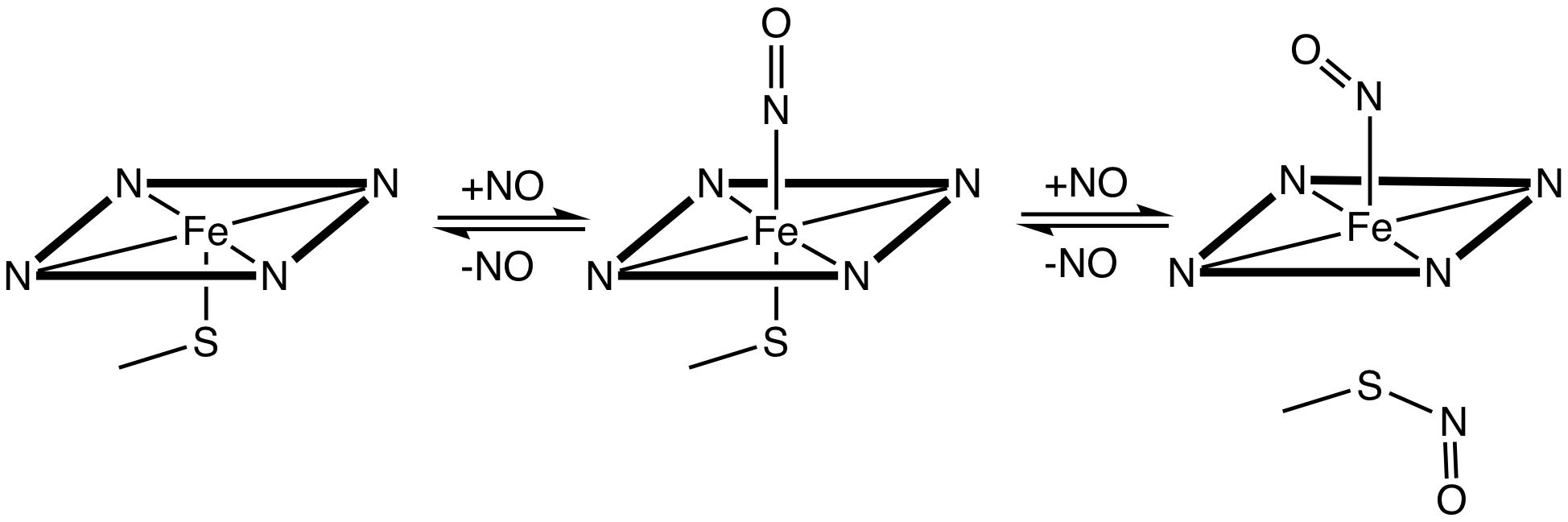
Nitrosylation of a heme-thiolate, steps in cell signaling by nitric oxide (porphyrin is depicted as the square).

== Applications ==
Metal-nitrosyls are assumed to be intermediates in catalytic converters, which reduce the emission of NO_{x} from internal combustion engines. This application has been described as "one of the most successful stories in the development of catalysts".

Structure of a dinitrosyl iron complex (DNIC).

Metal-catalyzed reactions of NO are not often useful in organic chemistry. In biology and medicine, nitric oxide is however an important signalling molecule in nature and this fact is the basis of the most important applications of metal nitrosyls. The nitroprusside anion, [Fe(CN)_{5}NO]^{2−}, a mixed nitrosyl cyano complex, has pharmaceutical applications as a slow release agent for NO. The signalling function of NO is effected via its complexation to haem proteins, where it binds in the bent geometry. Nitric oxide also attacks iron-sulfur proteins giving dinitrosyl iron complexes.

== Thionitrosyls ==
Several complexes are known with NS ligands. Like nitrosyls, thionitrosyls exist as both linear and bent geometries.
