= Roussin's black salt =

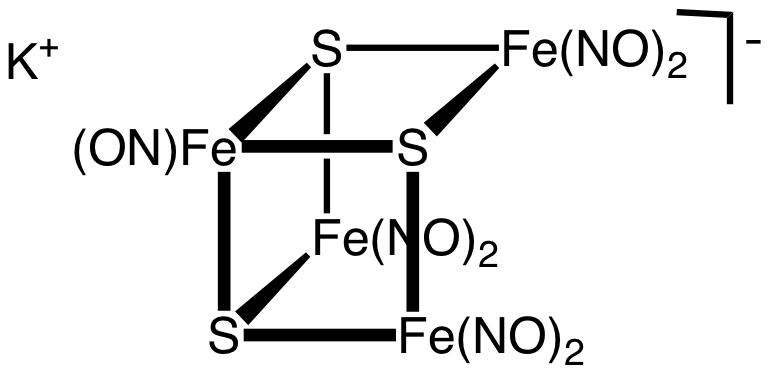

Names
- Other names potassium heptanitrosyltri-μ3-thiotetraferrate

Identifiers
CAS Number	12518-87-5 (potassium salt); 12518-87-5 (anion); 54724-04-8 (ammonium salt); 83017-31-6 (sodium salt)
3D model (JSmol)	Interactive image
- InChI: InChI=1S/4Fe.K.7NO.3S/c;;;;;7*1-2;;;/q4*-2;8*+1;;; Key: HCASECMHPPKIPY-UHFFFAOYSA-N
- SMILES: [K+].[Fe-3]12([N+]#[O+])S3[Fe-4]([N+]#[O+])([N+]#[O+])S1[Fe-4]([N+]#[O+])([N+]#[O+])S2[Fe-4]3([N+]#[O+])[N+]#[O+]

Properties
Chemical formula	Fe_{4}KN_{7}O_{7}S_{3}
Molar mass	568.70 g·mol^{−1}
Appearance	Black solid
Melting point	198 to 200 °C (388 to 392 °F; 471 to 473 K)

Related compounds
Related	Roussin's Red Salt
- Except where otherwise noted, data are given for materials in their standard state (at 25 °C [77 °F], 100 kPa). Infobox references

Roussin's black salt is a chemical compound with the formula KFe_{4}S_{3}(NO)_{7}. It consists of the potassium salt of the [Fe_{4}S_{3}(NO)_{7}]^{−} anion, metal nitrosyl compound. First described by Zacharie Roussin in 1858, it is one of the first synthetic iron-sulfur clusters along with the red salt also bearing his name.

== Structure ==
The cluster anion has the geometry of an incomplete cubane-type cluster with C_{3v} symmetry. The dark colour of the complex is attributed to a number of charge-transfer interactions.

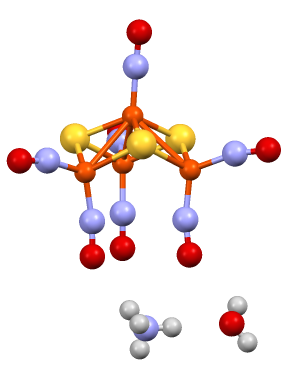
Structure of the hydrated ammonium salt of [Fe_{4}S_{3}(NO)_{7}]^{−}.

== Synthesis ==
Roussin’s black salt is produced by the reaction of nitrous acid, potassium hydroxide, potassium sulfide, and iron(II) sulfate in aqueous solution. It can also be formed by the conversion of Roussin's red salt in mildly acidic conditions. This reaction is reversible and Roussin’s red salt is reformed upon alkalization of the reaction solution.

== Uses ==
Roussin’s black salt is a nitric oxide donor. Also, Roussin’s Black Salt exhibits antibacterial activity in some food processing applications.

== See also ==
- Roussin's red salt
