= Roussin's red salt =

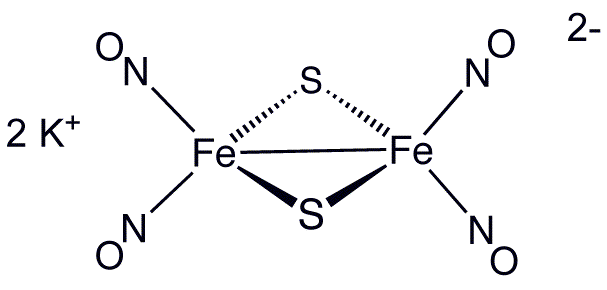

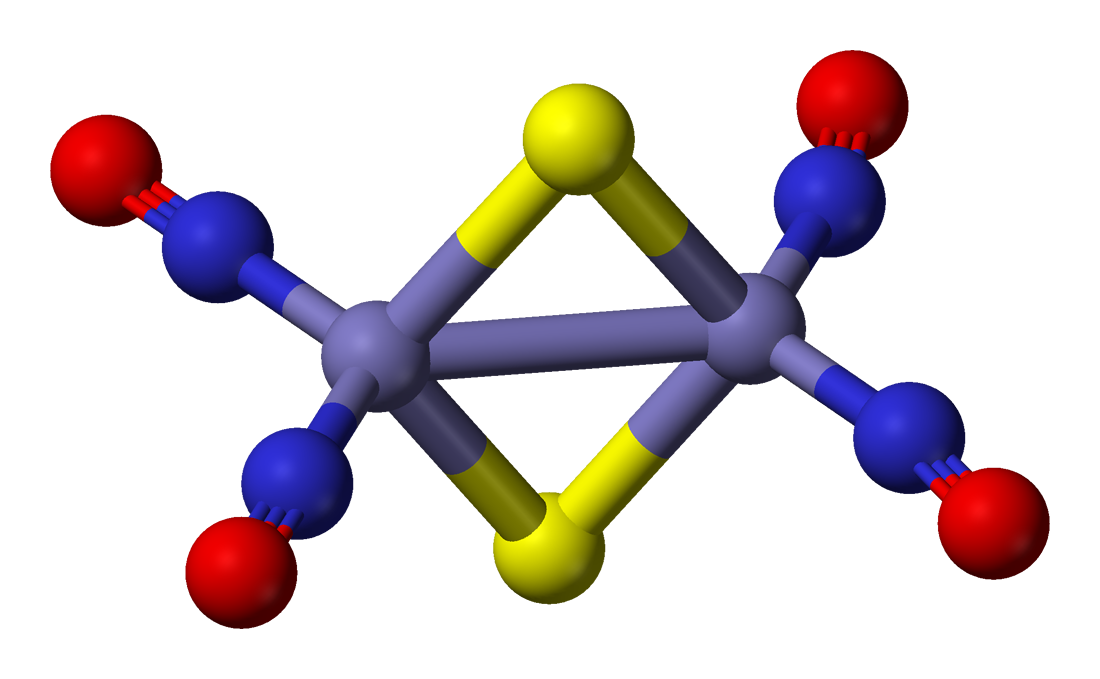

Names
- IUPAC name potassium tetranitrosyl-di-μ-sulfidodiiron(Fe–Fe)(2–)
- Other names Ferrate(2-), tetranitrosyldi-mu-thioxodi-, (Fe-Fe), dipotassium

Identifiers
CAS Number	58204-17-4
3D model (JSmol)	Interactive image
ChemSpider	142967
PubChem CID	162850 (formula error)
CompTox Dashboard (EPA)	DTXSID20973767
- InChI: InChI=1S/2Fe.4NO.2S/c;;4*1-2;;/q;;4*+1;2*-2 Key: HAJABACXLZMFIH-UHFFFAOYSA-N
- SMILES: [K+].[K+].O=N[Fe-]12(N=O)S[Fe-]1(S2)(N=O)N=O

Properties
Chemical formula	Fe_{2}N_{4}K_{2}O_{4}S_{2}
Molar mass	374.04 g/mol
Appearance	Dark red crystals
- Except where otherwise noted, data are given for materials in their standard state (at 25 °C [77 °F], 100 kPa). verify (what is ?) Infobox references

Roussin's red salt is the inorganic compound with the formula K_{2}[Fe_{2}S_{2}(NO)_{4}]. This metal nitrosyl was first described by Zacharie Roussin in 1858, making it one of the first synthetic iron-sulfur clusters.

== Structure and bonding ==
Roussin's red salt anion is an edge-shared bitetrahedron, wherein a pair Fe(NO)_{2} units are bridged by a pair of sulfide ligands. The Fe-NO bonds are linear indicating NO is acting as a three electron donor. The diamagnetic compound obeys the 18-electron rule. The dark red colour of the complex is attributed to a number of charge-transfer interactions between the iron core and nitrosyl ligands.

== Synthesis ==
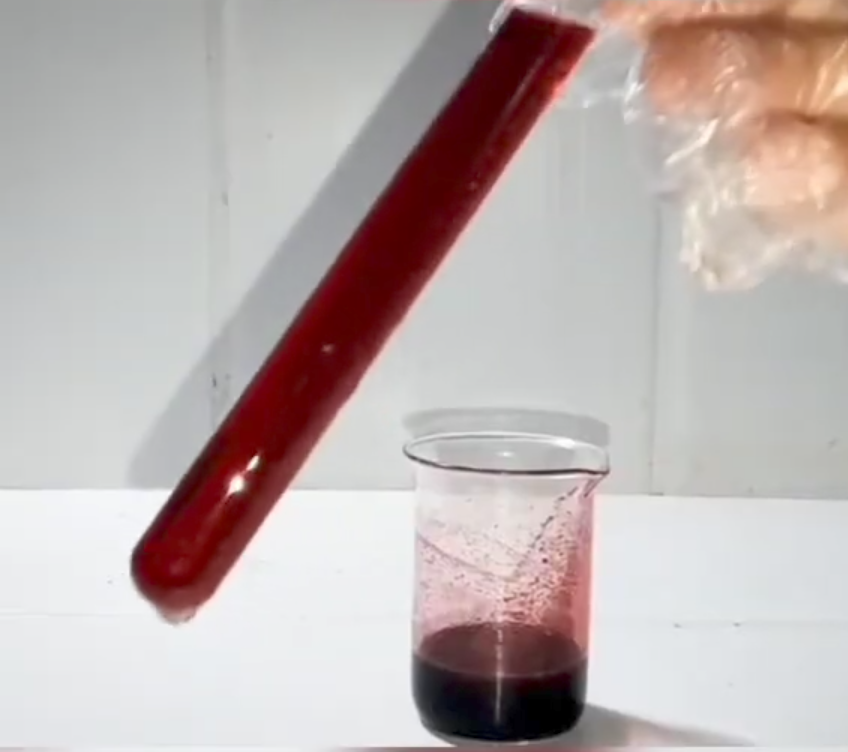
Roussin's red salt solution.

The French chemist Z. Roussin first prepared this salt while investigating reactions between nitroprusside ion ([Fe(CN)_{5}NO]^{2−}) and sulfur. The salt can be prepared by the reaction of sulfide salts with iron nitrosyl halides:

Fe_{2}I_{2}(NO)_{4} + 2 Li_{2}S → Li_{2}Fe_{2}S_{2}(NO)_{4} + 2 LiI

Another way to obtain Roussin's red salt is to alkalize a solution of the related compound Roussin's black salt, K[Fe_{4}S_{3}(NO)_{7}], using a suitable base:

2 K[Fe_{_{4}}S_{_{3}}(NO)_{_{7}}] + 4 KOH → 3 K_{_{2}}[Fe_{_{2}}S_{_{2}}(NO)_{_{4}}] + 2 Fe(OH)_{_{2}} + 2 NO

Another obtaining procedure consists of reacting sodium (or potassium) nitrite, ascorbic acid, ferrous sulfate, sodium sulfide and sodium (or potassium) hydroxide in this order. Ascorbic acid works both as an acidulant and as a reducing agent, converting nitrite into nitrous acid and then reducing it to nitrogen monoxide, which will then bind to iron ions forming nitrosyl complexes, which will react with sulfide in a basic medium giving Roussin's red salt.

2 FeSO_{4} + 4 HNO_{2} + 3 C_{6}H_{8}O_{6} + 2 Na_{2}S + 2 NaOH → Na_{2}[Fe_{2}S_{2}(NO)_{4}] + 3 C_{6}H_{6}O_{6} + 2 Na_{2}SO_{4} + 6 H_{2}O

To obtain the "esters", the salt is alkylated:

Li_{2}Fe_{2}S_{2}(NO)_{4} + 2 RX → Fe_{2}(SR)_{2}(NO)_{4} + 2 LiX

Esters can also be easily be prepared from the reaction of Fe_{2}I_{2}(NO)_{4} with the thiol or thiosulfate.

== Occurrence and potential applications ==
It is found in nature as its "esters" with the formula Fe_{2}(SR)_{2}(NO)_{4}, where "R" is any alkyl group. In addition Roussin's red salt is discussed in the fields of microbiology and food science due to its mutagenic properties.

The ester derivative are being investigated as nitric oxide donors in biology and medicine, due to the relatively low toxicity and good stability of Roussin's red salt.Photodissociation of the compound induces the release of NO, thereby sensitizing target cells to exposure to radiation.

== See also ==
- Roussin's black salt
