= George W. Santos =

American oncologist and medicine professor

George W. Santos (1928–2001) was a professor of oncology and medicine at the School of Medicine, Johns Hopkins University.

== Birth and education ==
George W. Santos was born in 1928. He received his bachelor's degree in quantitative biology from MIT. He completed his master's degree in physical biology from MIT. After his completing his studies at MIT, he received his medical degree and completed a residency and fellowship at Johns Hopkins University.

== Research ==
George W. Santos was a renowned expert in bone marrow transplantation. He became interested in bone marrow transplantation while serving in the Naval Reserves at the U.S. Naval Radiologic Defense Laboratory in San Francisco from 1956 to 1958. He founded the Johns Hopkins Oncology Center's bone marrow transplant program and served as its director from 1968 until his retirement in 1994. One of his major contributions was the development of the regimen to prepare patients for the procedure by using the anticancer drugs busulfan and cytoxan, which quickly became the worldwide standard.

His other research were:

- The use of the drug 4-HC to purge patients' diseased marrow of cancer cells, allowing them to self-donate;
- treatments to prevent and manage opportunistic infections in immuno-compromised bone marrow transplant patients;
- techniques in T-cell depletion that reduced both complications and relapses.

He was among the first to test the drug cyclosporine for the treatment of life-threatening transplantation complication known as graft-versus-host disease.

== Awards and honours ==
George W. Santos received several awards and honors for his contributions to medicine. He was awarded the Bristol Myers Squibb Award for Distinguished Achievement in Cancer Research and the American Society for Blood and Marrow Transplantation Lifetime Achievement Award.
