= Transition metal complexes of 2,2′-bipyridine =

Transition metal complexes of 2,2′-bipyridine are coordination complexes containing one or more 2,2′-bipyridine ligands. Complexes have been described for all of the transition metals. Although few have any practical value, these complexes have been influential. 2,2′-Bipyridine (bipy) is classified as a diimine ligand. Unlike the structures of pyridine complexes, the two rings in bipy are coplanar, which facilitates electron delocalization. As a consequence of this delocalization, bipy complexes often exhibit distinctive optical and redox properties.

== Complexes ==
Bipy forms a wide variety of complexes. Almost always, it is a bidentate ligand, binding metal centers with the two nitrogen atoms. Examples:

- Mo(CO)_{4}(bipy), derived from Mo(CO)_{6}.
- RuCl_{2}(bipy)_{2}, a popular precursor to mixed ligand complexes.
- [Ru(bipy)_{3}]^{2+}, a well studied luminophore.
- [Fe(bipy)_{3}]^{2+} has been used for the colorimetric analysis of iron ions.
- {[Ru(bipyridine)_{2}(OH_{2})]_{2}(O)}^{2+}, "ruthenium blue" has attracted academic interest as a rare complex that catalyzes the oxidation of water.

=== Tris-bipy complexes ===
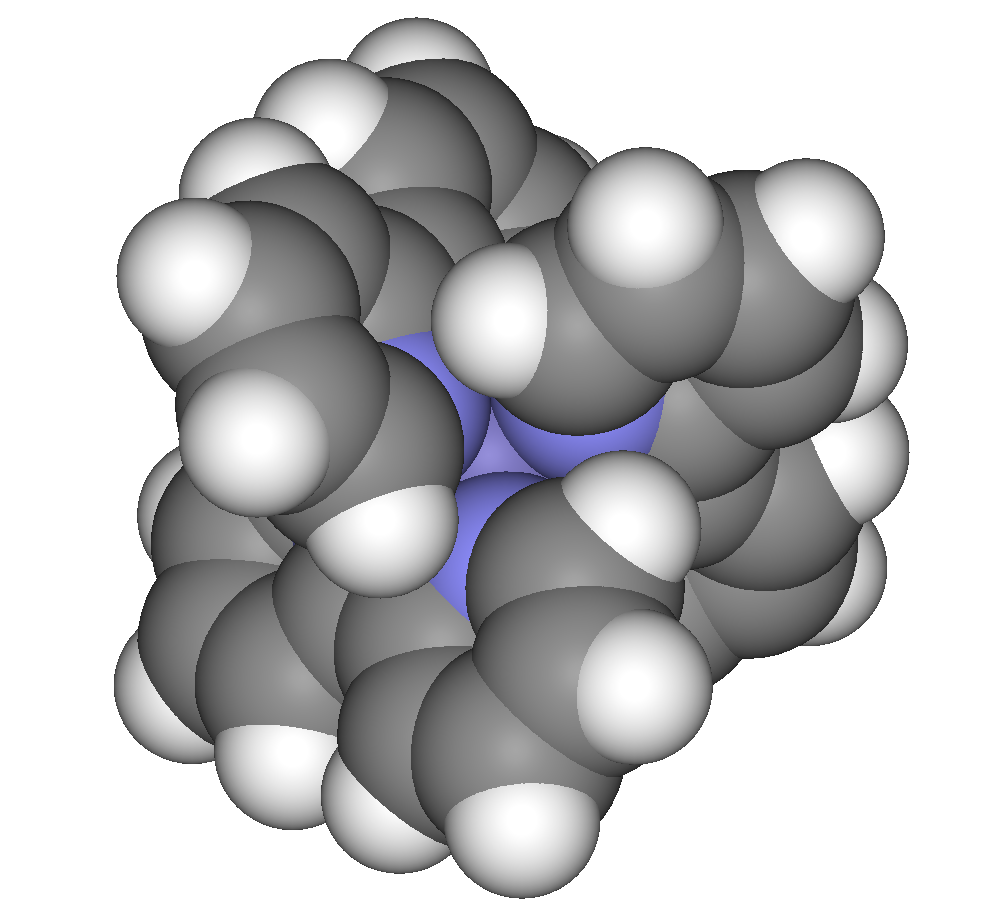
Three-dimensional view of the [Fe(bipy)_{3}]^{2+} complex.

Bipyridine complexes absorb intensely in the visible part of the spectrum. The electronic transitions are attributed to metal-to-ligand charge transfer (MLCT). In the "tris(bipy) complexes" three bipyridine molecules coordinate to a metal ion, written as [M(bipy)_{3}]^{n+} (M = metal ion; Cr, Fe, Co, Ru, Rh and so on). These complexes have six-coordinated, octahedral structures and exists as enantiomeric pairs:

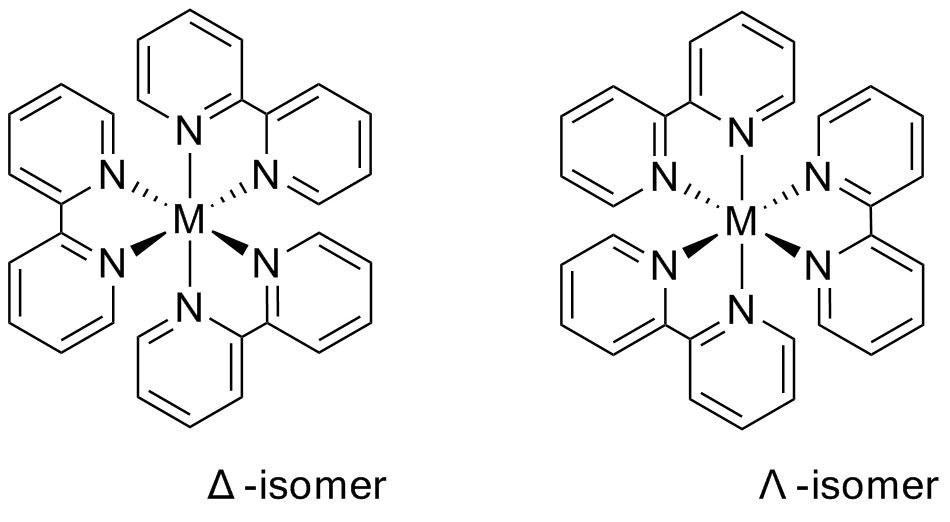

These and other homoleptic tris-2,2′-bipy complexes of many transition metals are electroactive. Often, both the metal centred and ligand centred electrochemical reactions are reversible one-electron reactions that can be observed by cyclic voltammetry. Under strongly reducing conditions, some tris(bipy) complexes can be reduced to neutral derivatives containing bipy^{−} ligands. Examples include M(bipy)_{3}, where M = Al, Cr, Si.

=== Square planar complexes ===
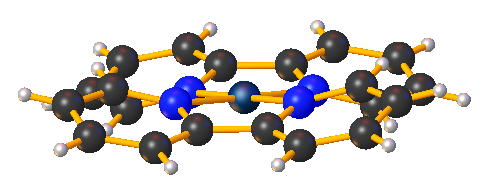
Structure of [Pt(bipy)_{2}]^{2+} as determined by X-ray crystallography.

Square planar complexes of the type [Pt(bipy)_{2}]^{2+} react with nucleophiles because of the steric clash between the 6,6′ positions between the pair of bipy ligands. This clash is indicated by the bowing of the pyridyl rings out of the plane defined by PtN_{4}.

== Related ligands ==
Many ring-substituted variants of bipy have been described, especially dimethyl-2,2'-bipyridines. Alkyl substituents enhance the solubility of the complexes in organic solvents. 6,6′-Substituents tend to protect the metal center.

The related N,N-heterocyclic ligand phenanthroline forms similar complexes. With respective pK_{a}'s of 4.86 and 4.3 for their conjugate acids, phenanthroline and bipy are of comparable basicity.

2,2′-Biquinoline is closely related to bipy as a ligand.
