= Tris(bipyridine)iron(II) chloride =

Identifiers
CAS Number	14751-83-8
3D model (JSmol)	Interactive image
ChemSpider	176367
PubChem CID	203609
- InChI: InChI=1S/3C10H8N2.2ClH.Fe/c3*1-3-7-11-9(5-1)10-6-2-4-8-12-10;;;/h3*1-8H;2*1H;/q;;;;;+2/p-2 Key: GBRPARYPGGYWHF-UHFFFAOYSA-L
- SMILES: [n+]12ccccc1c1cccc[n+1]1[Fe-4]234([n+]1ccccc1c1cccc[n+1]13)[n+]1ccccc1c1cccc[n+1]14.[Cl-].[Cl-]

Properties
Chemical formula	C_{30}H_{24}Cl_{2}FeN_{6}
Molar mass	595.31 g·mol^{−1}
Appearance	red solid
- Except where otherwise noted, data are given for materials in their standard state (at 25 °C [77 °F], 100 kPa). Infobox references

Tris(bipyridine)iron(II) chloride is the chloride salt of the coordination complex tris(bipyridine)iron(II), [Fe(C_{10}H_{8}N_{2})_{3}]^{2+} (often shortened to [Fe(bipy_{3}]^{2+}). It is a red, water-soluble solid. It is one of the most studied transition metal complexes of 2,2'-bipyridine.

== Structure ==
Tris(bipyridine)iron(II) center features an octahedral Fe(II) center bound to three bipyridine ligands. As confirmed many times by x-ray crystallography, the dication is octahedral, the Fe(II) center occupying a chiral pocket. The cation has idealized D_{3} symmetry, and as such both Δ and Λ are observed. The Fe-N distances are near 196 picometers, consistent with low spin complex.

The complex has been isolated as salts with many anions. The chloride salt is readily soluble in aqueous solution, and the hexafluorophosphate salt is soluble in organic solvents such as nitriles.

== Synthesis and reactions ==
The sulfate salt [Fe(bipy)_{3}]SO_{4} is produced by combining ferrous sulfate with excess bipy in aqueous solution. This result illustrates the preference of Fe(II) for bipyridine vs water. The potentials for |[Fe(bipy)_{3}]^{2+/3+} and [Fe(phen)_{3}]^{2+/3+} are very similar.

Addition of cyanide to an aqueous solution of [Fe(bipy)_{3}]SO_{4} precipitates Fe(bipy)_{2}(CN)_{2}.

[Fe(bipy)_{3}]^{2+} salts can also be prepared from Iron(II) tetrafluoroborate in the solid state via mechanochemistry.

== Electronic absorption spectrum ==
The electronic absorption spectrum of [Fe(bipy)_{3}]^{2+} features a metal-to-ligand charge-transfer (MLCT) band at 540 nm (ε = 8,000‑14,000 M^{−1}cm^{−1}), a weak shoulder due to the spin-forbidden ^{3}MLCT transition at 640 nm (ε < 50 M^{−1}cm^{−1}), a higher lying MLCT band at 350 nm (ε = 6,000‑10,500 M^{−1}cm^{−1}), and a bipy π‑π* transition at 290 nm (ε = 40,000‑70,000 M^{−1}cm^{−1}).

== Photoinduced dynamics ==
In contrast to tris(bipyridine)ruthenium(II), this iron complex is not a useful photosensitizer because its excited states relax too rapidly, a consequence of the primogenic effect.

[Fe(bipy)_{3}]^{2+} is a model system for photoinduced spin crossover/Light Induced Excited Spin State Trapping (LIESST). Upon photoexcitation of its ^{1}MLCT band, the molecule undergoes intersystem crossing to the high-spin ^{5}d–d state in less than 50 fs. The lifetime of the high-spin state is 650 ps. The large changes in electronic structure, spin state, and Fe–N bond length in the high-spin state lead to strong transient signals in the time-resolved X-ray absorption spectra (XAS) and X-ray emission spectra (XES). Time-resolved Fe K-edge EXAFS has revealed a 0.203 ± 0.008 Å increase in Fe–N bond length in the high-spin state. The large transient signals and ultrafast formation of the high-spin state has led to the application of [Fe(bipy)_{3}]^{2+} as a reference compound used at many synchrotron beamlines to find temporal overlap of the laser pump and X-ray probe pulses and to measure the instrument response function (IRF). The time resolution of these experiments is typically limited by the ~70 ps duration of the X-ray pulses, so the formation of the high-spin state is effectively instantaneous and the rise of the transient signal is IRF-limited. Since the advent of X-ray free-electron laser (XFEL) and high harmonic generation sources capable of producing sub-picosecond pulses of X-rays, the ultrafast spin-crossover dynamics of [Fe(bipy)_{3}]^{2+} and related complexes have been a popular target for femtosecond X-ray spectroscopy experiments. The improved time resolution of these experiments enabled detection of the short-lived intermediate ^{3}d–d state, whose lifetime was measured with Fe Kβ XES to be 58 fs in [Fe(bipy)_{3}]^{2+} and with Fe M_{2,3}-edge XANES to be 39 fs in tris(o-phenanthroline)iron(II).

== Related complexes ==
- Tris(o-phenanthroline)iron(II)
