= Polypyridine complex =

Polypyridine complexes are coordination complexes containing polypyridine ligands, such as 2,2'-bipyridine, 1,10-phenanthroline, or 2,2';6'2"-terpyridine.

Polypyridines are multidentate ligands that confer characteristic properties to the metal complexes that they form. Some complexes strongly absorb light via a process called metal-to-ligand charge transfer (MLCT). The properties of these complexes can be tuned by changes in substituents. For example, electron donation, electron withdrawal, and π-conjugating groups, to the polypyridine moiety. The MLCT absorption band can be shifted, the emission wavelength can be changed, and the emission lifetime can be extended.

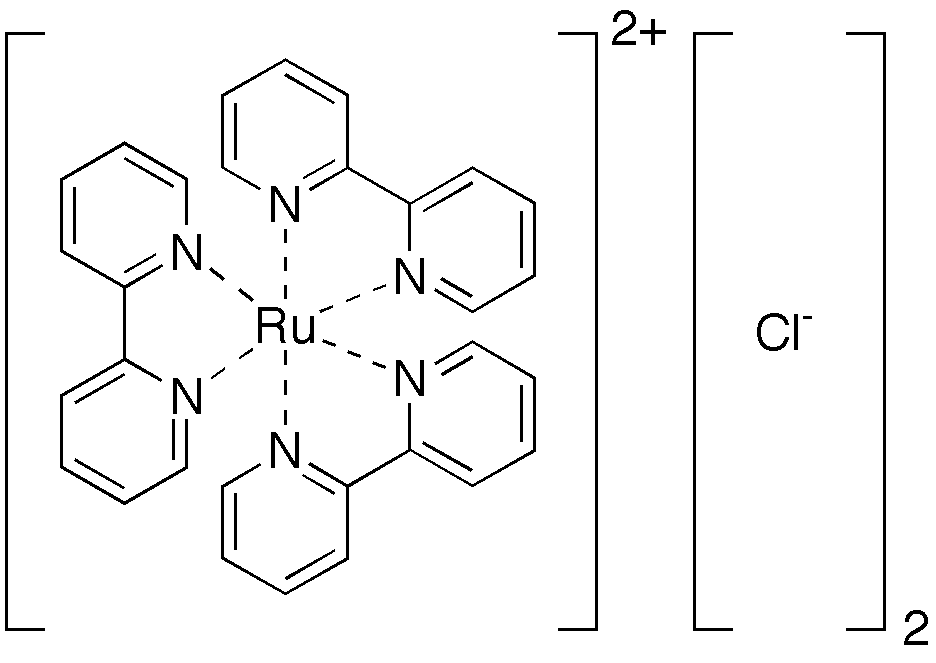
Tris(bipyridine)ruthenium(II) is the preeminent example of a polypyridine complex.

A well-known example of a polypyridine complex is the tris(bipyridine) derivative of ruthenium(II), [Ru(bpy)_{3}]^{2+}. This complex exhibits intense luminescence at room temperature in aqueous solution. Another example is a platinum-bipyridine-dithiolate complex, Pt(bpy)(bdt), in which bdt denotes a 1,2-benzenedithiolate anion. This complex also exhibits photoluminescence at room temperature, and its wavelength and lifetime can be tuned by substitution of either bipyridine or dithiolate moieties. Structural control is easier than for ruthenium complexes due to the square planar structure of the platinum complex.

Some other areas of investigation involves immobilizing these complexes on electrodes. Some polypyridyl complexes intercalate into DNA and show promise as drugs.

== See also ==
- Transition metal complexes of 2,2'-bipyridine
