= C11H9N3O =

The molecular formula C_{11}H_{9}N_{3}O (molar mass: 199.21 g/mol) may refer to:

- 3-Pyridylnicotinamide (3-pna), or N-(pyridin-3-yl)nicotinamide
- 4-Pyridylnicotinamide (4-PNA)
