= Pyridylnicotinamide =

Pyridylnicotinamide may refer to one of two isomers with molecular formula C_{11}H_{9}N_{3}O:

- 3-Pyridylnicotinamide
- 4-Pyridylnicotinamide
