= C10H8N2 =

The molecular formula C_{10}H_{8}N_{2} (molar mass: 156.18 g/mol, exact mass: 156.0687 u) may refer to:

- Bipyridines
  - 2,2'-Bipyridine
  - 4,4'-Bipyridine
