= Primogenic effect =

Differences in excited states of metals

In inorganic chemistry, the primogenic effect describes the change in excited state manifolds for first-row vs. second-row and third-row transition metal complexes. The effect is used to rationalize the ability or inability of certain metal complexes to function as photosensitizers, which in turn is relevant to photocatalysis.

Complexes of the type [M(2,2’-bipyridine)_{3}]^{2+} are low spin for M^{2+} = Fe(II), Ru(II), and Os(II). These species have similar ground state properties: they are diamagnetic and undergo reversible oxidation to the trications. As a consequence of the primogenic effect, the first excited state for [Fe(bipy)_{3}]^{2+} is a ligand field state (LF state) with a high spin configuration. Such LF states characteristically decay to the ground state rapidly (femtoseconds). By contrast, for [Ru(bipy)_{3}]^{2+} and [Os(bipy)_{3}]^{2+}, the first excited state is charge-transfer in character. Bonding in this kind of excited state can be described as [M^{III}(bipy^{−})(bipy)_{2}]^{2+}, i.e. an oxidized metal ion bound to one bipy radical anion as well as two ordinary bipy ligands. Such charge-separated states have relatively long lifetimes of 900 (Ru) and 25 (Os) nanoseconds. Nanosecond lifetimes are sufficiently long that these excited states can participate in bimolecular reactions, i.e. they can photosensitize. One consequence of the primogenic effect is that first-row metals are usually incapable of serving as photosensitizers. This failure is unfortunate because first row metals are far cheaper than second and third row metals.

The origin of the primogenic effect is traced to the presence (second-row and third-row metals) or absence (first-row metals) of a radial nodes in the wave functions of the valence d orbitals.
