= Ruthenium(III) chloride =

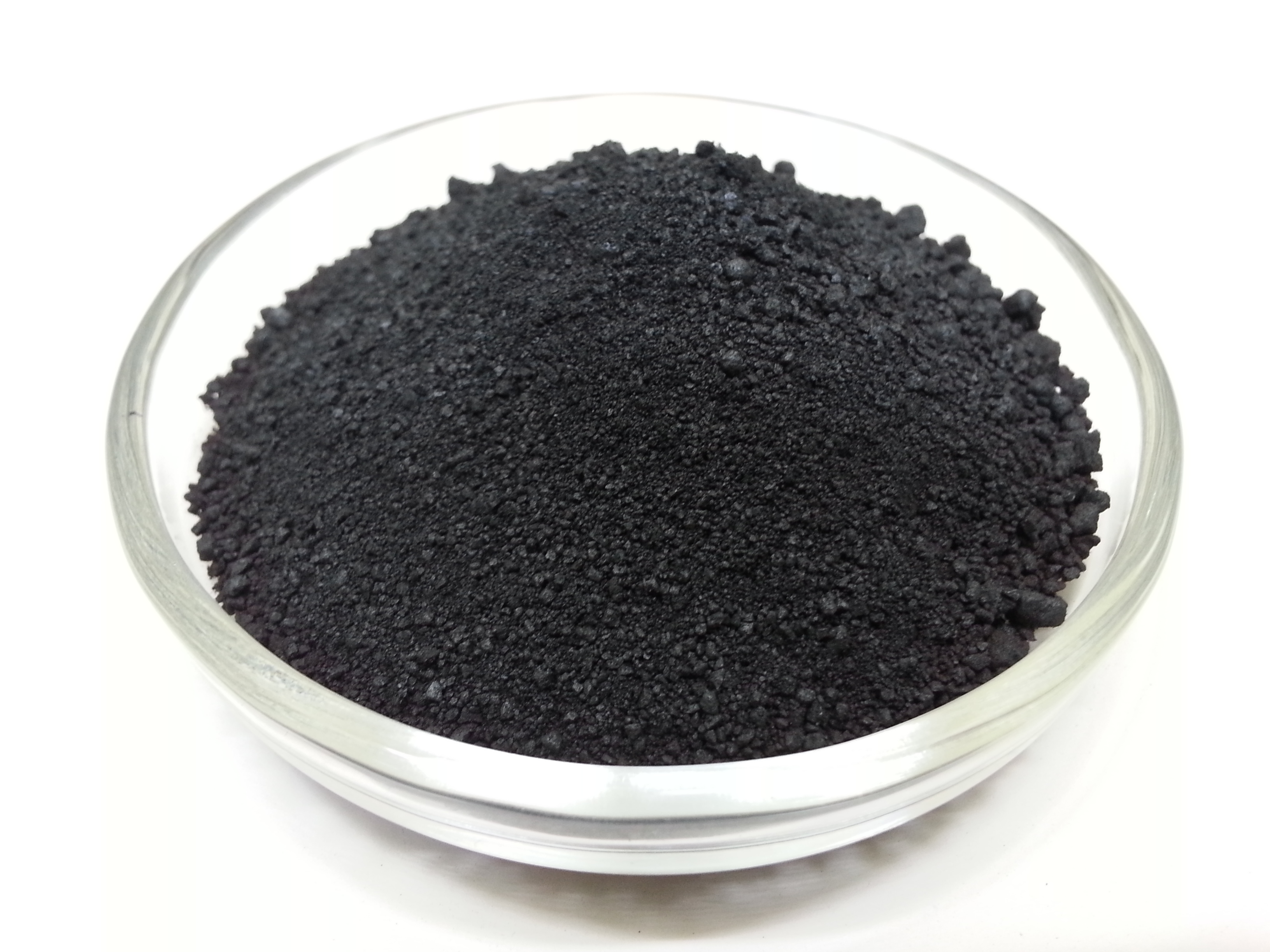

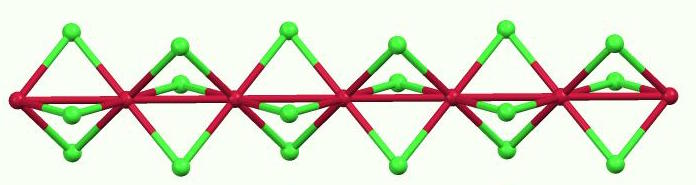

Identifiers
CAS Number	10049-08-8; 13815-94-6 (trihydrate); 14898-67-0 (x-hydrate)
3D model (JSmol)	Interactive image; Interactive image
ChemSpider	74294
ECHA InfoCard	100.030.139
PubChem CID	82323
RTECS number	VM2650000
UNII	RY8V1UJV23
CompTox Dashboard (EPA)	DTXSID101014308 DTXSID00275675, DTXSID101014308
- InChI: InChI=1S/3ClH.Ru/h3*1H;/q;;;+3/p-3 Key: YBCAZPLXEGKKFM-UHFFFAOYSA-K; InChI=1/3ClH.Ru/h3*1H;/q;;;+3/p-3 Key: YBCAZPLXEGKKFM-DFZHHIFOAX
- SMILES: Cl[Ru](Cl)Cl; [Cl-].[Cl-].[Cl-].[Ru+3]

Properties
Chemical formula	RuCl_{3}·xH_{2}O
Molar mass	207.43 g/mol
Melting point	>500°C (decomposes)
Solubility in water	Soluble, Anhydrous is insoluble
Magnetic susceptibility (χ)	+1998.0·10^{−6} cm^{3}/mol

Structure
Crystal structure	trigonal (RuCl_{3}), hP8
Space group	P3c1, No. 158
Coordination geometry	octahedral

Hazards
Flash point	Nonflammable

Related compounds
Other anions	Ruthenium(III) bromide
Other cations	Rhodium(III) chloride Iron(III) chloride
Related compounds	Ruthenium tetroxide
- Except where otherwise noted, data are given for materials in their standard state (at 25 °C [77 °F], 100 kPa). verify (what is ?) Infobox references

Ruthenium(III) chloride is the chemical compound with the formula RuCl_{3}. "Ruthenium(III) chloride" more commonly refers to the hydrate RuCl_{3}·xH_{2}O. Both the anhydrous and hydrated species are dark brown or black solids. The hydrate, with a varying proportion of water of crystallization, often approximating to a trihydrate, is a commonly used starting material in ruthenium chemistry.

== Preparation and properties ==
Anhydrous ruthenium(III) chloride is usually prepared by heating powdered ruthenium metal with chlorine. In the original synthesis, the chlorination was conducted in the presence of carbon monoxide, the product being carried by the gas stream and crystallising upon cooling. Two polymorphs of RuCl_{3} are known. The black α-form adopts the CrCl_{3}-type structure with long Ru-Ru contacts of 346 pm. This polymorph has honeycomb layers of Ru^{3+} which are surrounded with an octahedral cage of Cl^{−} anions. The ruthenium cations are magnetic residing in a low-spin J~1/2 ground state with net angular momentum L=1. Layers of α-RuCl_{3} are stacked on top of each other with weak Van der Waals forces. These can be cleaved to form mono-layers using scotch tape.

The dark brown metastable β-form crystallizes in a hexagonal cell; this form consists of infinite chains of face-sharing octahedra with Ru-Ru contacts of 283 pm, similar to the structure of zirconium trichloride. The β-form is irreversibly converted to the α-form at 450–600 °C. The β-form is diamagnetic, whereas α-RuCl_{3} is paramagnetic at room temperature.

RuCl_{3} vapour decomposes into the elements at high temperatures; the enthalpy change at 750 °C (1020 K), Δ_{diss}H_{1020} has been estimated as +240 kJ/mol.

== Solid state physics ==
α-RuCl_{3} was proposed as a candidate for a Kitaev quantum spin liquid state when neutron scattering revealed an unusual magnetic spectrum, and thermal transport revealed chiral Majorana Fermions when subject to a magnetic field.

== Coordination chemistry of hydrated ruthenium trichloride ==
As the most commonly available ruthenium compound, RuCl_{3}·xH_{2}O is the precursor to many hundreds of chemical compounds. The noteworthy property of ruthenium complexes, chlorides and otherwise, is the existence of more than one oxidation state, several of which are kinetically inert. All second and third-row transition metals form exclusively low spin complexes, whereas ruthenium is special in the stability of adjacent oxidation states, especially Ru(II), Ru(III) (as in the parent RuCl_{3}·xH_{2}O) and Ru(IV).

=== Illustrative complexes derived from "ruthenium trichloride" ===
- RuCl_{2}(PPh_{3})_{3}, a chocolate-colored, benzene-soluble species, which in turn is also a versatile starting material. It arises approximately as follows:

2 RuCl_{3}·xH_{2}O + 7 PPh_{3} → 2 RuCl_{2}(PPh_{3})_{3} + OPPh_{3} + 5 H_{2}O + 2 HCl

- Diruthenium tetraacetate chloride, a mixed valence polymer, is obtained by reduction of ruthenium trichloride in acetic acid.
- [RuCl_{2}(C_{6}H_{6})]_{2} arises from 1,3-cyclohexadiene or 1,4-cyclohexadiene as follows:

2 RuCl_{3}·xH_{2}O + 2 C_{6}H_{8} → [RuCl_{2}(C_{6}H_{6})]_{2} + 6 H_{2}O + 2 HCl + H_{2}

- Ru(bipy)_{3}Cl_{2}, an intensely luminescent salt with a long-lived excited state, arising as follows:

2 RuCl_{3}·xH_{2}O + 6 bipy + CH_{3}CH_{2}OH → 2 [Ru(bipy)_{3}]Cl_{2} + 6 H_{2}O + CH_{3}CHO + 2 HCl

This reaction proceeds via the intermediate cis-Ru(bipy)_{2}Cl_{2}.

- [RuCl_{2}(C_{5}Me_{5})]_{2}, arising as follows:

2 RuCl_{3}·xH_{2}O + 2 C_{5}Me_{5}H → [RuCl_{2}(C_{5}Me_{5})]_{2} + 6 H_{2}O + 2 HCl

[RuCl_{2}(C_{5}Me_{5})]_{2} can be further reduced to [RuCl(C_{5}Me_{5})]_{4}.

- Ru(C_{5}H_{7}O_{2})_{3} arises as follows:

RuCl_{3}·xH_{2}O + 3 C_{5}H_{8}O_{2} → Ru(C_{5}H_{7}O_{2})_{3} + 3 H_{2}O + 3 HCl

- RuO_{4} is produced by oxidation.

Some of these compounds were utilized in the research related to two Nobel Prizes. Ryōji Noyori was awarded the Nobel Prize in Chemistry in 2001 for the development of practical asymmetric hydrogenation catalysts based on ruthenium. Robert H. Grubbs was awarded the Nobel Prize in Chemistry in 2005 for the development of practical alkene metathesis catalysts based on ruthenium alkylidene derivatives.

=== Carbon monoxide derivatives ===
RuCl_{3}(H_{2}O)_{x} reacts with carbon monoxide under mild conditions. In contrast, iron chlorides do not react with CO. CO reduces the red-brown trichloride to yellowish Ru(II) species. Specifically, exposure of an ethanol solution of RuCl_{3}(H_{2}O)_{x} to 1 atm of CO gives, depending on the specific conditions, [Ru_{2}Cl_{4}(CO)_{4}], [Ru_{2}Cl_{4}(CO)_{4}]^{2−}, and [RuCl_{3}(CO)_{3}]^{−}. Addition of ligands (L) to such solutions gives Ru-Cl-CO-L compounds (L = PR_{3}). Reduction of these carbonylated solutions with Zn affords the orange triangular cluster Ru_{3}(CO)_{12}.

3 RuCl_{3}·xH_{2}O + 4.5 Zn + 12 CO (high pressure) → Ru_{3}(CO)_{12} + 3x H_{2}O + 4.5 ZnCl_{2}

== Sources ==
- Becker, Ramona; Hartwig, Helga; Köppe, Herbert; Vanecek, Hans; Velić, Paul; Warncke, Rudolf; Zelle, Anna (1978). Warncke, Rudolf (ed.). Gmelin Handbuch der Anorganischen Chemie. doi:10.1007/978-3-662-06224-1. ISBN 978-3-662-06226-5.
