= Aminopyridine =

Aminopyridine may refer to any of several chemical compounds:

- 2-Aminopyridine
- 3-Aminopyridine
- 4-Aminopyridine (4-AP), also known as fampridine or dalfampridine
