= 2-Chloroquinoline =

Names
- Preferred IUPAC name 2-Chloroquinoline

Identifiers
CAS Number	612-62-4
3D model (JSmol)	Interactive image
ChEMBL	ChEMBL2042580
ChemSpider	11434
ECHA InfoCard	100.009.381
EC Number	210-317-8
PubChem CID	11928
UNII	UX7RIN8GEW
CompTox Dashboard (EPA)	DTXSID8060612
- InChI: InChI=1S/C9H6ClN/c10-9-6-5-7-3-1-2-4-8(7)11-9/h1-6H Key: OFUFXTHGZWIDDB-UHFFFAOYSA-N
- SMILES: C1=CC=C2C(=C1)C=CC(=N2)Cl

Properties
Chemical formula	C_{9}H_{6}ClN
Molar mass	163.60 g·mol^{−1}
Appearance	White solid
Melting point	38 °C (100 °F; 311 K)
Boiling point	266 °C (511 °F; 539 K)

Hazards
- GHS labelling
Pictograms	(GHS07: Exclamation mark)
Signal word	Warning
Hazard statements	H315, H319, H335
Precautionary statements	P261, P264, P271, P280, P302+P352, P304+P340, P305+P351+P338, P312, P321, P332+P313, P337+P313, P362, P403+P233, P405, P501
- Except where otherwise noted, data are given for materials in their standard state (at 25 °C [77 °F], 100 kPa). Infobox references

2-Chloroquinoline is an organic compound with the formula ClC_{9}H_{6}N. It is one of several isomeric chloro derivatives of the bicyclic heterocycle called quinoline. A white solid, 2-chloroquinoline can be prepared from vinylaniline and phosgene. It is a precursor to 2,2'-biquinoline.
