= Tris(bipyridine)ruthenium(II) chloride =

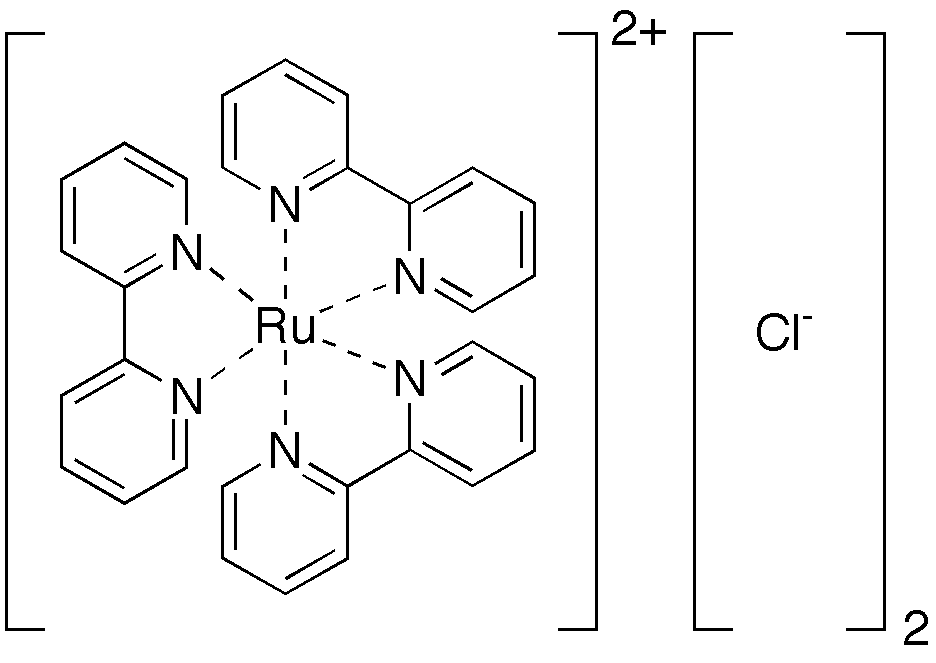

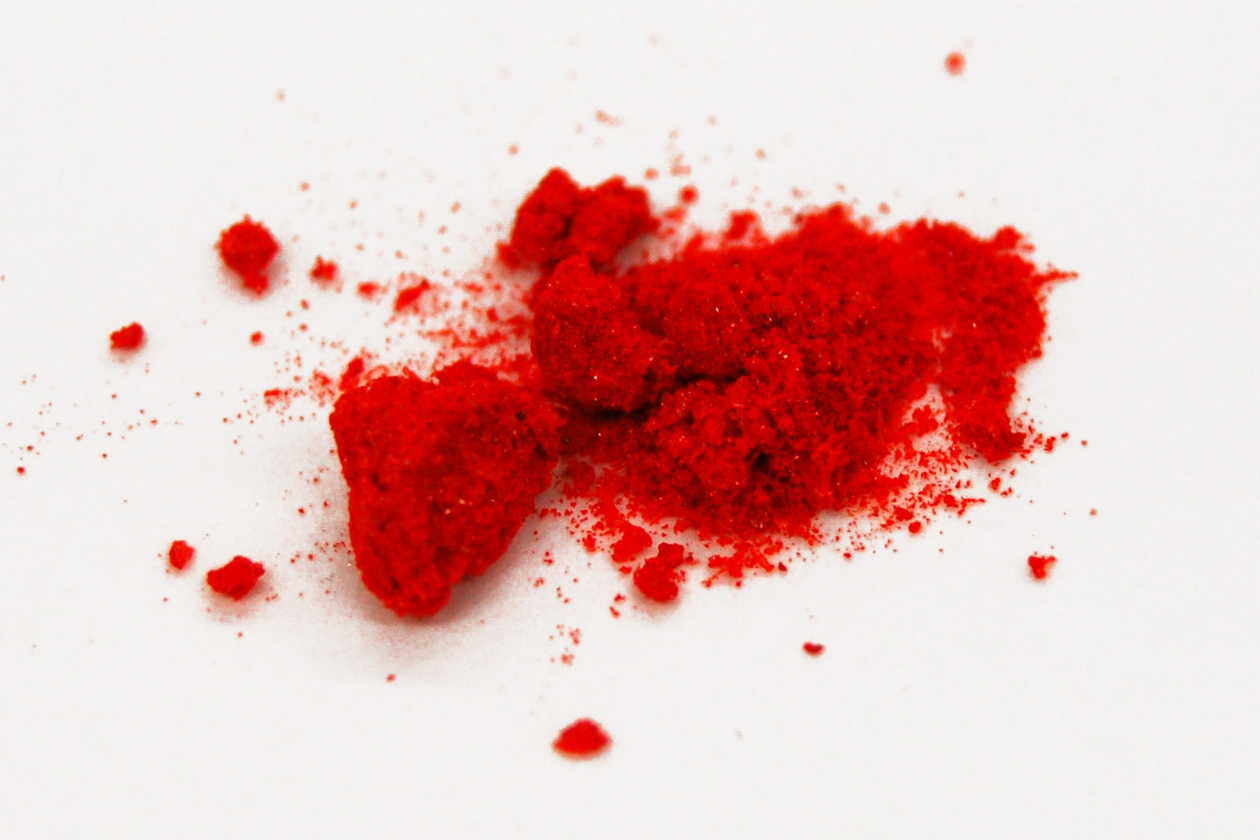

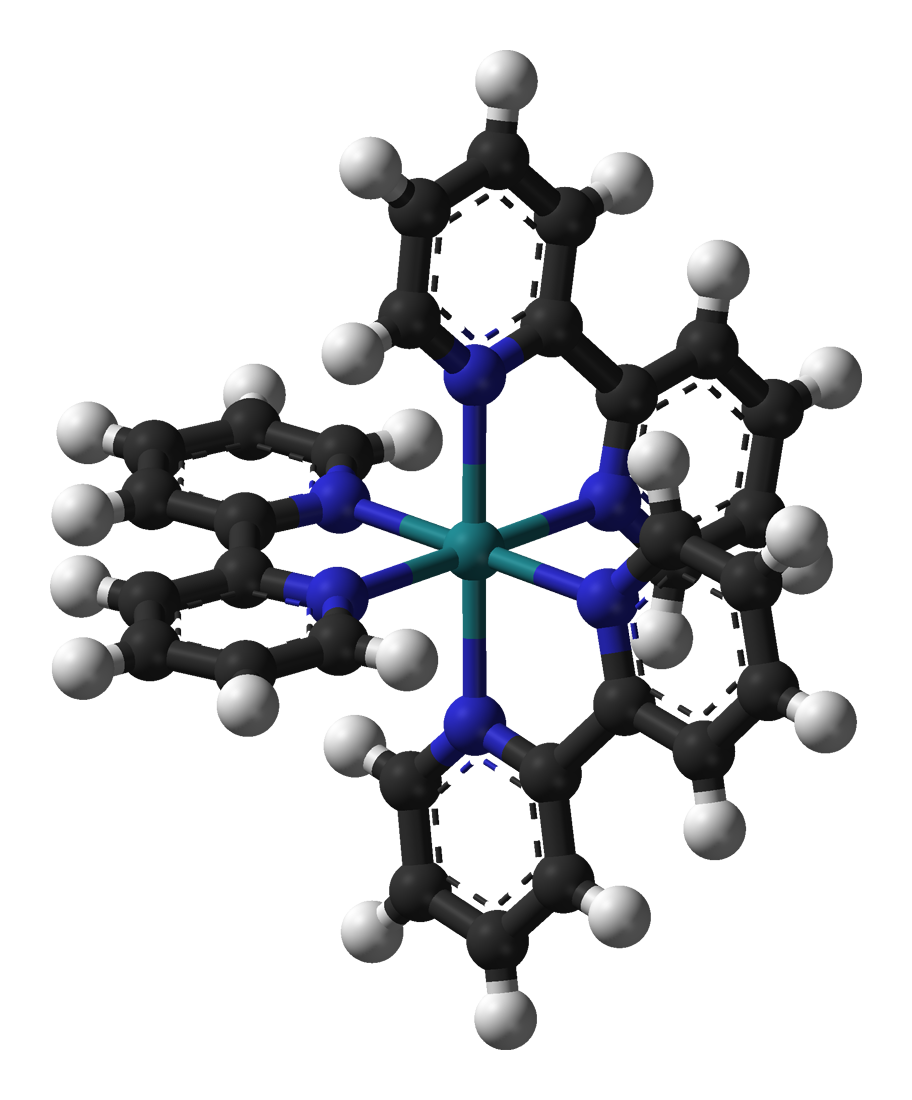

Names
- Other names Ru-bpy; Ruthenium-tris(2,2’-bipyridyl) dichloride

Identifiers
CAS Number	(anhydrous): 14323-06-9; (hexahydrate): 50525-27-4
3D model (JSmol)	(anhydrous): Interactive image; (hexahydrate): Interactive image
ChemSpider	(anhydrous): 76095; (hexahydrate): 149371
ECHA InfoCard	100.034.772
EC Number	(anhydrous): 238-266-7
PubChem CID	(anhydrous): 10908382; (hexahydrate): 170850
RTECS number	(anhydrous): VM2730000
UNII	(anhydrous): ALF8B3WYC2
CompTox Dashboard (EPA)	(anhydrous): DTXSID20931786; (hexahydrate): DTXSID50964749
- InChI: (anhydrous): InChI=1S/3C10H8N2.2ClH.Ru/c3*1-3-7-11-9(5-1)10-6-2-4-8-12-10;;;/h3*1-8H;2*1H;/q;;;;;+2/p-2 Key: SJFYGUKHUNLZTK-UHFFFAOYSA-L; (hexahydrate): InChI=1S/3C12H8N2.2ClH.6H2O.Ru/c3*1-3-9-5-6-10-4-2-8-14-12(10)11(9)13-7-1;;;;;;;;;/h3*1-8H;2*1H;6*1H2;/q;;;;;;;;;;;+2/p-2 Key: UUSPGQXHSZVVNL-UHFFFAOYSA-L
- SMILES: (anhydrous): [n+]12ccccc1c1cccc[n+1]1[Ru-4]234([n+]1ccccc1c1cccc[n+1]13)[n+]1ccccc1c1cccc[n+1]14.[Cl-].[Cl-]; (hexahydrate): [n+]12ccccc1c1cccc[n+1]1[Ru-4]234([n+]1ccccc1c1cccc[n+1]13)[n+]1ccccc1c1cccc[n+1]14.O.O.O.O.O.O.[Cl-].[Cl-]

Properties
Chemical formula	C_{30}H_{24}N_{6}Cl_{2}Ru·6H_{2}O
Molar mass	640.53 g/mol (anhydrous); 748.62 g/mol (hexahydrate)
Appearance	red solid
Density	solid
Melting point	>300 °C
Solubility in water	slightly soluble in water; soluble in acetone

Structure
Molecular shape	Octahedral
Dipole moment	0 D

Hazards
- Occupational safety and health (OHS/OSH)
Main hazards	mildly toxic
Safety data sheet (SDS)	External MSDS

Related compounds
Related compounds	Ruthenium trichloride 2,2'-bipyridine
- Except where otherwise noted, data are given for materials in their standard state (at 25 °C [77 °F], 100 kPa). verify (what is ?) Infobox references

Tris(bipyridine)ruthenium(II) chloride is the chloride salt coordination complex [Ru(bpy)_{3}]^{2+}. This polypyridine complex is a red crystalline salt obtained as the hexahydrate, although all of the properties of interest are in the cation [Ru(bpy)_{3}]^{2+}, which has received much attention because of its distinctive optical properties. The chlorides can be replaced with other anions, such as PF_{6}^{−}.

== Synthesis and structure ==
cis-Dichlorobis(bipyridine)ruthenium(II) is an intermediate in the synthesis of tris(bipyridine)ruthenium(II) chloride.

This salt is prepared by treating an aqueous solution of ruthenium trichloride with 2,2'-bipyridine. In this conversion, Ru(III) is reduced to Ru(II), and hypophosphorous acid is typically added as a reducing agent. [Ru(bpy)_{3}]^{2+} is octahedral, containing a central low spin d^{6} Ru(II) ion and three bidentate bpy ligands. The Ru-N distances are 2.053(2), shorter than the Ru-N distances for [Ru(bpy)_{3}]^{3+}. The complex is chiral, with D_{3} symmetry. It has been resolved into its enantiomers. In its lowest lying triplet excited state the molecule is thought to attain lower C_{2} symmetry, as the excited electron is localized primarily on a single bipyridyl ligand.

== Photochemistry of [Ru(bpy)_{3}]^{2+} ==
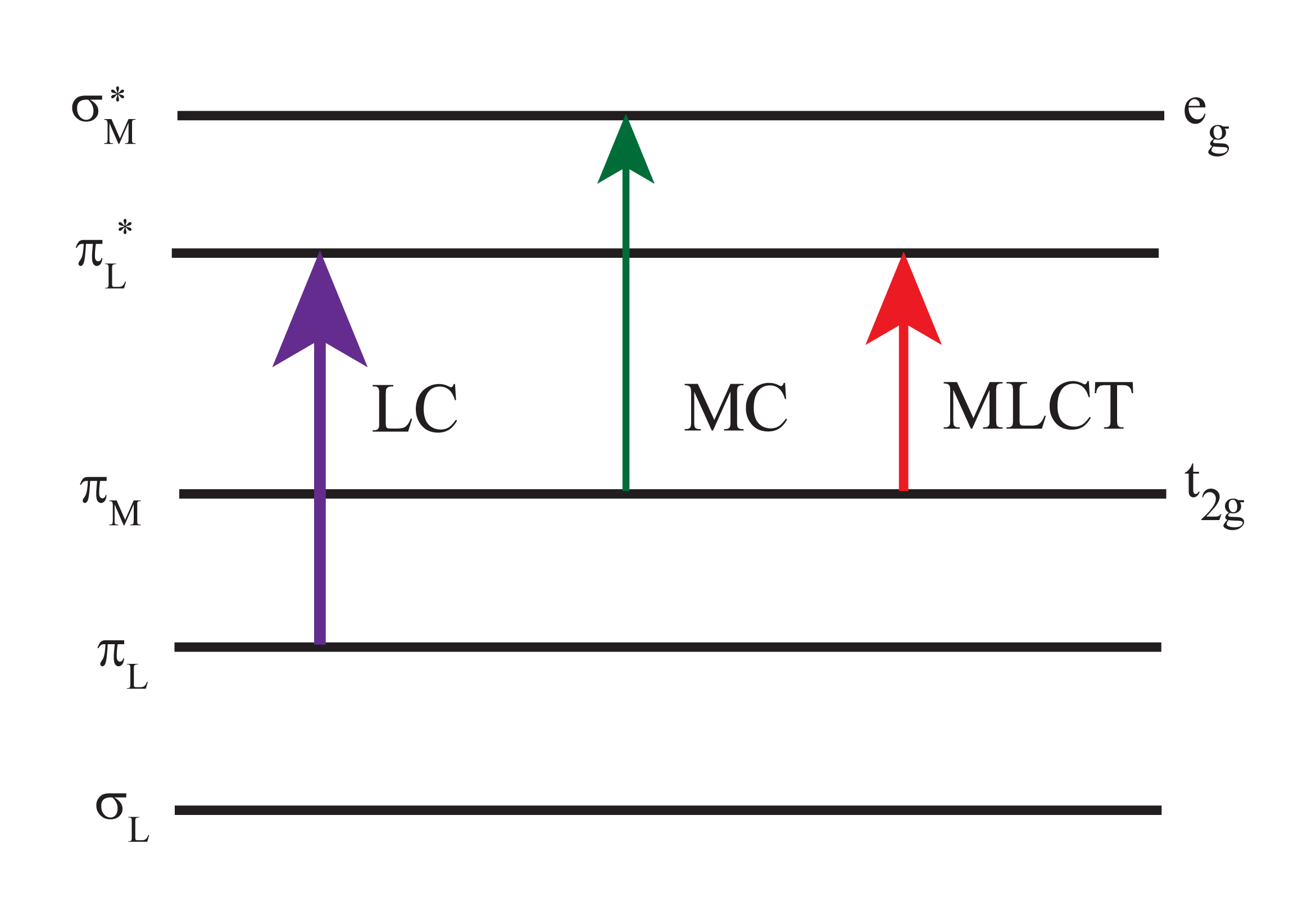
Transitions of [Ru(bpy)_{3}]^{2+} where MC is metal centered, LC is ligand centered, and MLCT is metal ligand charge transfer.

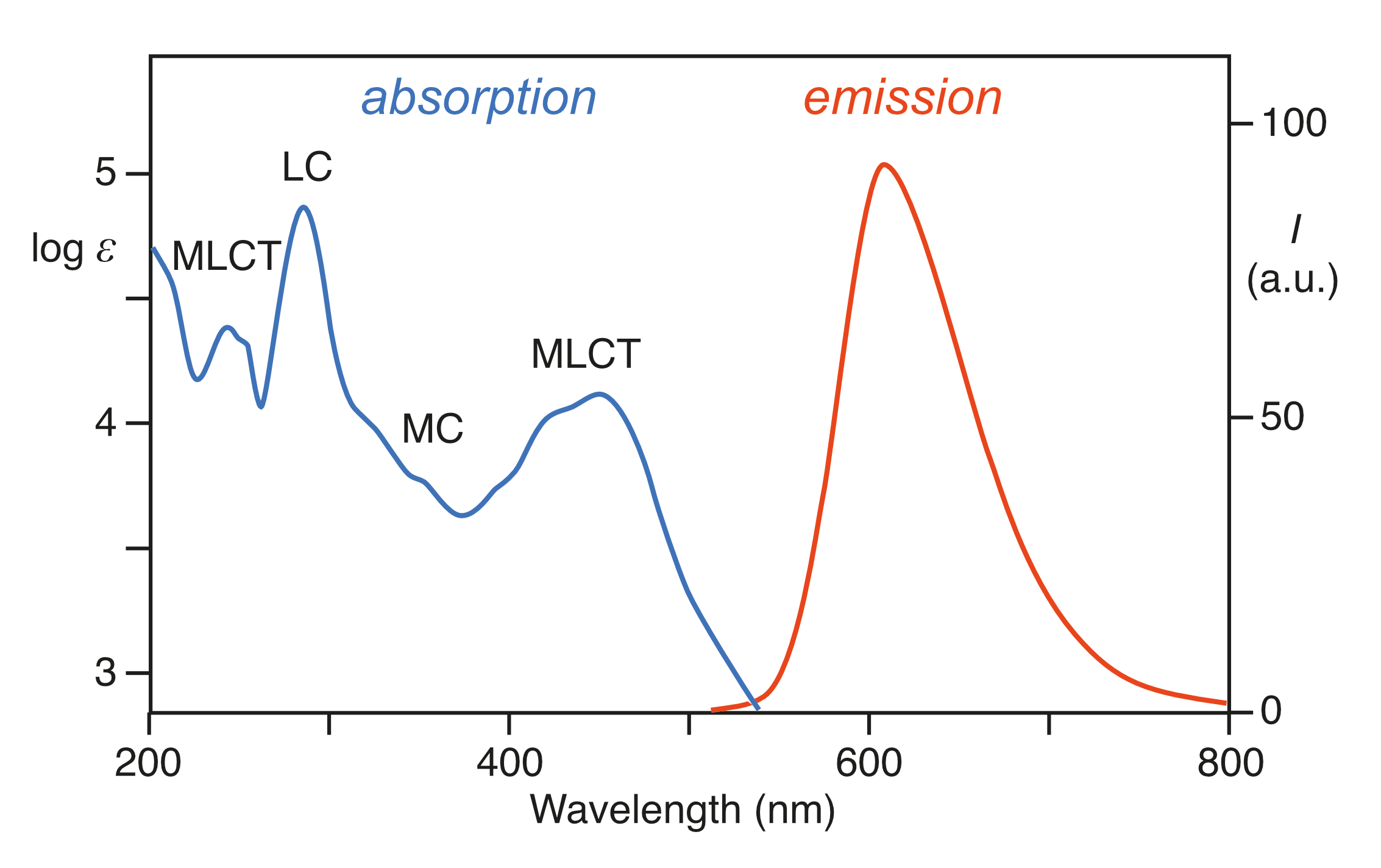
Absorption and emission spectrum of [Ru(bpy)_{3}]^{2+} in alcoholic solution at room temperature

[Ru(bpy)_{3}]^{2+} absorbs ultraviolet and visible light. Aqueous solutions of Ru(bpy)_{3}Cl_{2} are orange due to a strong MLCT absorption at 452 ± 3 nm (extinction coefficient of 14,600 M^{−1}cm^{−1}). Further absorption bands are found at 285 nm corresponding to ligand centered π^{*}← π transitions and a weak transition around 350 nm (d-d transition). Light absorption results in formation of an excited state have a relatively long lifetime of 890 ns in acetonitrile and 650 ns in water. The excited state relaxes to the ground state by emission of a photon or non-radiative relaxation. The quantum yield is 2.8% in air-saturated water at 298 K and the emission maximum wavelength is 620 nm. The long lifetime of the excited state is attributed to the fact that it is triplet, whereas the ground state is a singlet state and in part due to the fact that the structure of the molecule allows for charge separation. Singlet-triplet transitions are forbidden and therefore often slow.

Like all molecular excited states, the triplet excited state of [Ru(bpy)_{3}]^{2+} has both stronger oxidizing and reducing properties than its ground state. This situation arises because the excited state can be described as an Ru^{3+} complex containing a bpy^{•−} radical anion as a ligand. Thus, the photochemical properties of [Ru(bpy)_{3}]^{2+} are reminiscent of the photosynthetic assembly, which also involves separation of an electron and a hole.

[Ru(bpy)_{3}]^{2+} has been examined as a photosensitizer for both the oxidation and reduction of water. Upon absorbing a photon, [Ru(bpy)_{3}]^{2+} converts to the aforementioned triplet state, denoted [Ru(bpy)_{3}]^{2+}*. This species transfers an electron, located on one bpy ligand, to a sacrificial oxidant such as peroxodisulfate (S_{2}O_{8}^{2−}). The resulting [Ru(bpy)_{3}]^{3+} is a powerful oxidant and oxidizes water into O_{2} and protons via a catalyst. Alternatively, the reducing power of [Ru(bpy)_{3}]^{2+}* can be harnessed to reduce methylviologen, a recyclable carrier of electrons, which in turn reduces protons at a platinum catalyst. For this process to be catalytic, a sacrificial reductant, such as EDTA^{4−} or triethanolamine is provided to return the Ru(III) back to Ru(II).

Derivatives of [Ru(bpy)_{3}]^{2+} are numerous. Such complexes are widely discussed for applications in biodiagnostics, photovoltaics and organic light-emitting diode, but no derivative has been commercialized. Application of [Ru(bpy)_{3}]^{2+} and its derivatives to fabrication of optical chemical sensors is arguably one of the most successful areas so far.

== [Ru(bpy)_{3}]^{2+} and photoredox catalysis ==
Photoredox catalysis exploits [Ru(bpy)_{3}]^{2+} as a sensitizer as a strategy for organic synthesis. Many analogues of [Ru(bpy)_{3}]^{2+} are employed as well. These transformations exploit the redox properties of [Ru(bpy)_{3}]^{2+}* and its reductively quenched derivative [Ru(bpy)_{3}]^{+}.

== Safety ==
Metal bipyridine as well as related phenanthroline complexes are generally bioactive, as they can act as intercalating agents.

== See also ==
- Primogenic Effect
- Tris(bipyridine)iron(II) chloride
