= 4-Aminopyridine =

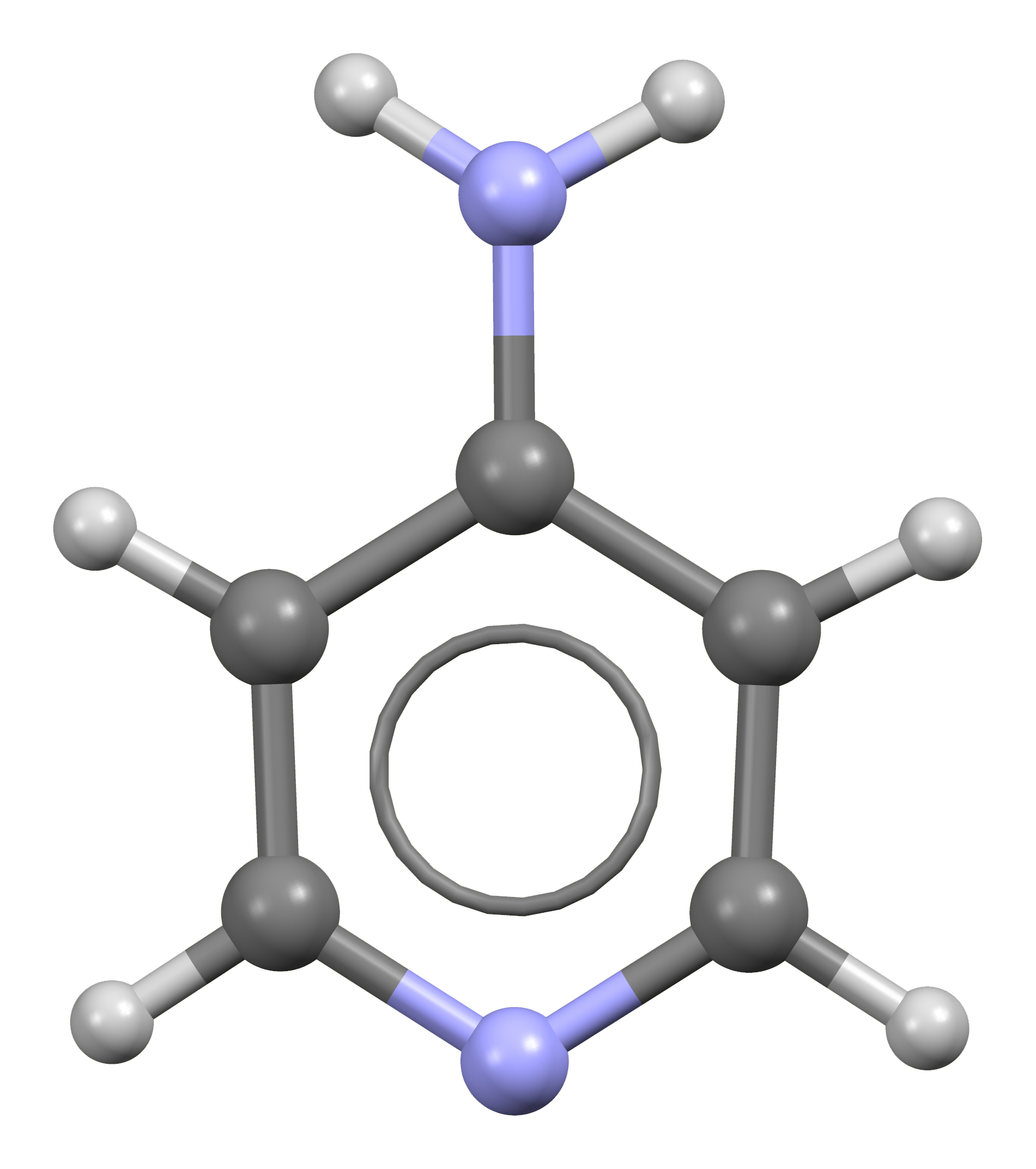

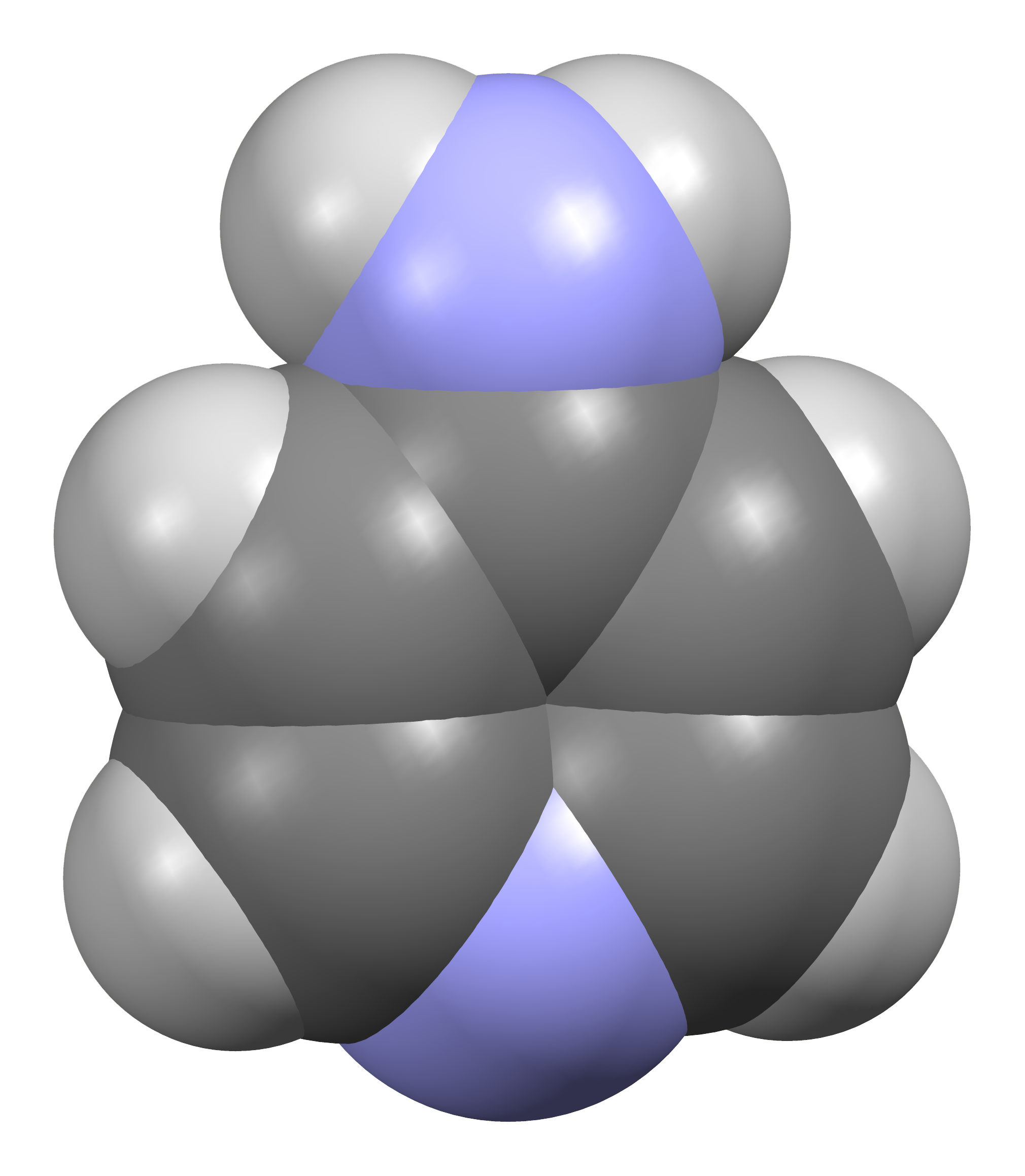

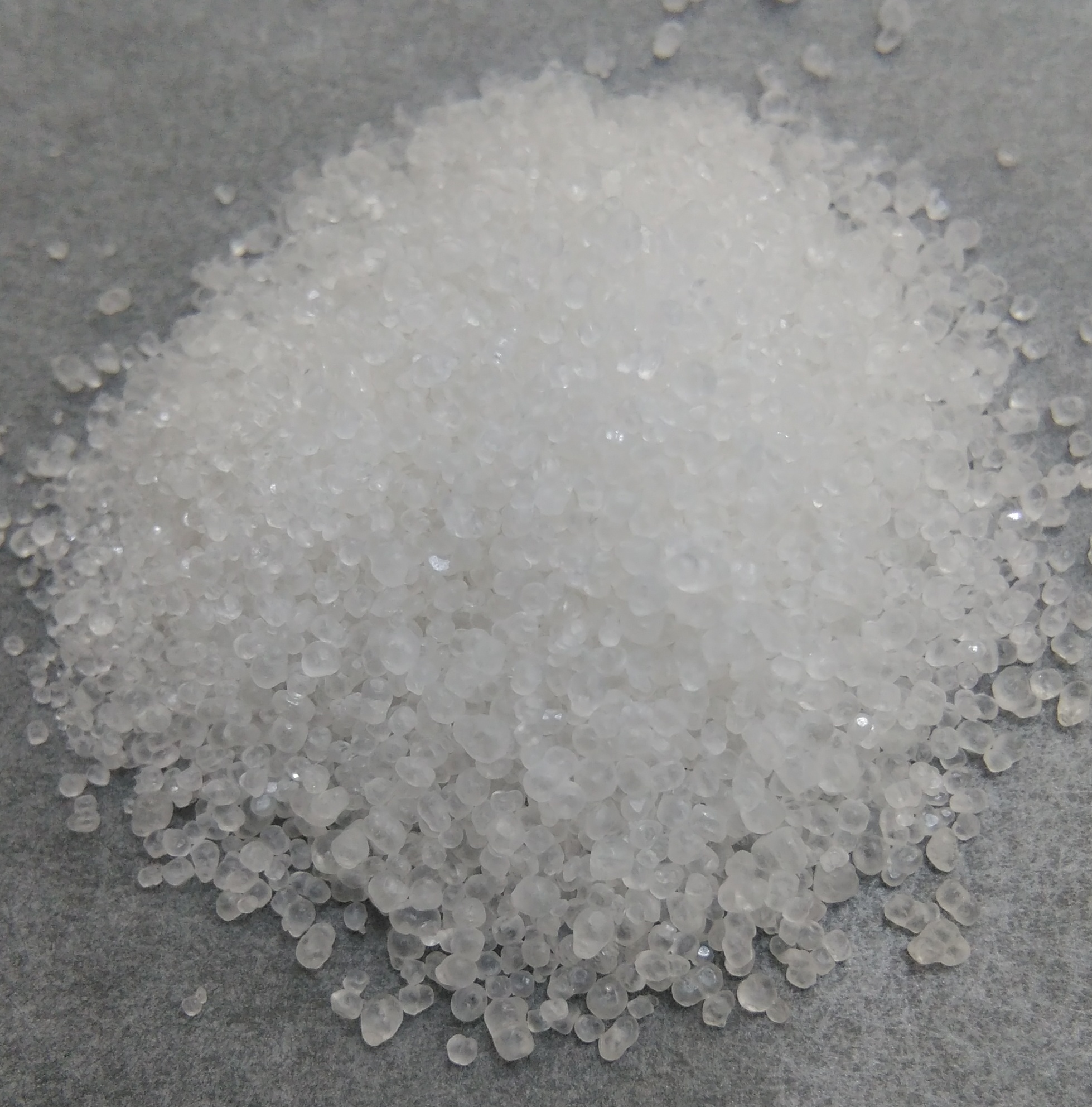

Names
- Preferred IUPAC name Pyridin-4-amine
- Other names 4-Pyridinamine; 4-Pyridylamine; Para-aminopyridine fampridine (INN) dalfampridine (USAN)

Identifiers
CAS Number	504-24-5
3D model (JSmol)	Interactive image
ChEBI	CHEBI:34385
ChEMBL	ChEMBL284348
ChemSpider	1664
DrugBank	DB06637
ECHA InfoCard	100.007.262
EC Number	207-987-9
IUPHAR/BPS	2416
KEGG	D04127; C13728
MeSH	4-Aminopyridine
PubChem CID	1727
UNII	BH3B64OKL9
CompTox Dashboard (EPA)	DTXSID0023870
- InChI: InChI=1S/C5H6N2/c6-5-1-3-7-4-2-5/h1-4H,(H2,6,7) Key: NUKYPUAOHBNCPY-UHFFFAOYSA-N; InChI=1/C5H6N2/c6-5-1-3-7-4-2-5/h1-4H,(H2,6,7) Key: NUKYPUAOHBNCPY-UHFFFAOYAH
- SMILES: n1ccc(N)cc1

Properties
Chemical formula	C_{5}H_{6}N_{2}
Molar mass	94.117 g·mol^{−1}
Appearance	Colourless solid
Melting point	155 to 158 °C (311 to 316 °F; 428 to 431 K)
Boiling point	273 °C (523 °F; 546 K)
Solubility in water	polar organic solvents
Basicity (pK_{b})	4.83

Pharmacology
ATC code	N07XX07 (WHO)
Pregnancy category	AU: C
Routes of administration	Oral
- Pharmacokinetics
Bioavailability	96%
Legal status	AU: S4 (Prescription only); UK: POM (Prescription only); US: ℞-only; EU: Rx-only
- Except where otherwise noted, data are given for materials in their standard state (at 25 °C [77 °F], 100 kPa). verify (what is ?) Infobox references

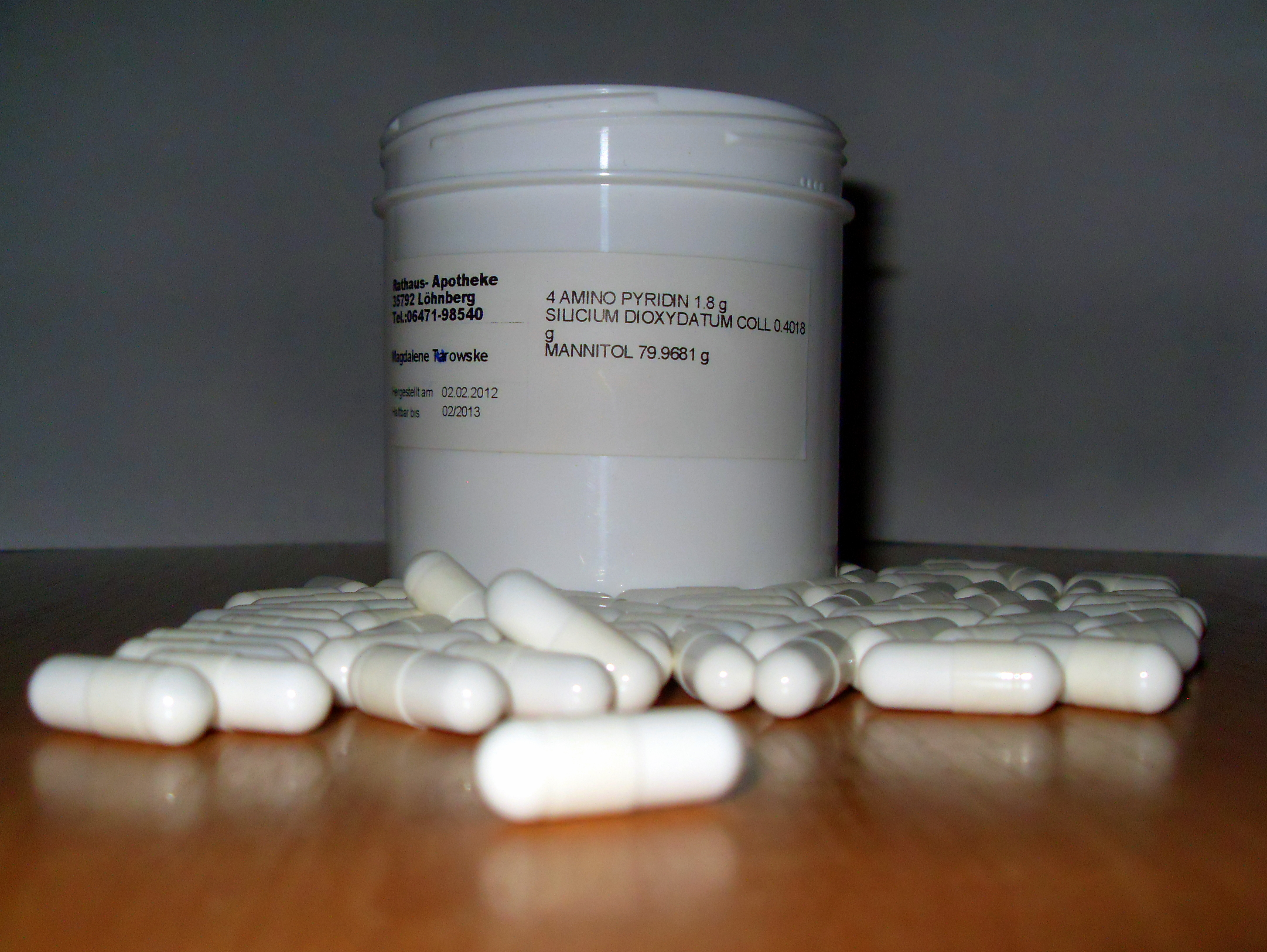
4-Aminopyridine

4-Aminopyridine (4-AP, fampridine, dalfampridine) is an organic compound with the chemical formula H_{2}NC_{5}H_{4}N. It is one of the three isomeric aminopyridines. It is used as a research tool in characterizing subtypes of the potassium channel. It has also been used as a drug, to manage some of the symptoms of multiple sclerosis, and is indicated for symptomatic improvement of walking in adults with several variations of the disease. It was undergoing Phase III clinical trials as of 2008, and the U.S. Food and Drug Administration (FDA) approved the compound on January 22, 2010. 4-AP has been used as treatment for KCNA2-related disorders with gene mutations that show a clear gain-of-function. Benefits include decreased seizures and improved ataxia, alertness, and cognition. Fampridine is also marketed as Ampyra (pronounced "am-PEER-ah", according to the maker's website) in the United States by Acorda Therapeutics and as Fampyra in the European Union, Canada, and Australia. In Canada, the medication has been approved for use by Health Canada since February 10, 2012.

== Applications ==
In the laboratory, 4-AP is a useful pharmacological tool in studying various potassium conductances in physiology and biophysics. It is a relatively selective blocker of members of Kv1 (Shaker, KCNA) family of voltage-activated K+ channels. However, 4-AP has been shown to potentiate voltage-gated Ca^{2+} channel currents independent of effects on voltage-activated K+ channels.

== Convulsant activity ==
4-Aminopyridine is a potent convulsant and is used to generate seizures in animal models for the evaluation of antiseizure agents.

=== Vertebrate pesticide ===
4-Aminopyridine is also used under the trade name Avitrol as 0.5% or 1% in bird control bait. It causes convulsions and, infrequently, death, depending on dosage. The manufacturer says the proper dose should cause epileptic-like convulsions which cause the poisoned birds to emit distress calls resulting in the flock leaving the site; if the dose was sub-lethal, the birds will recover after 4 or more hours without long-term ill effect. The amount of bait should be limited so that relatively few birds are poisoned, causing the remainder of the flock to be frightened away with a minimum of mortality. A lethal dose will usually cause death within an hour. The use of 4-aminopyridine in bird control has been criticized by the Humane Society of the United States.

=== Medical use ===
Fampridine
Clinical data
- Trade names: Ampyra, Fampyra, others
- AHFS/Drugs.com: Monograph
- MedlinePlus: a611005
- License data: US DailyMed: Dalfampridine

Identifiers
- IUPAC name: 1,4-dihydropyridin-4-imine
- DrugBank: DB06637
- CompTox Dashboard (EPA): DTXSID0023870
- ECHA InfoCard: 100.007.262

Fampridine has been used clinically in Lambert–Eaton myasthenic syndrome and multiple sclerosis. It acts by blocking voltage-gated potassium channels, prolonging action potentials and thereby increasing neurotransmitter release at the neuromuscular junction. The drug has been shown to reverse saxitoxin and tetrodotoxin toxicity in tissue and animal experiments. In calcium entry blocker overdose in humans, 4-aminopyridine can increase the cytosolic Ca2+ concentration very efficiently independent of the calcium channels.

==== Multiple sclerosis ====
Fampridine has been shown to improve visual function and motor skills and relieve fatigue in patients with multiple sclerosis (MS). However, the effect of the drug is strongly established for walking capacity only. Common side effects include dizziness, nervousness and nausea, and the incidence of adverse effects was shown to be less than 5% in all studies.

4-AP works as a potassium channel blocker. Strong potassium currents decrease action potential duration and amplitude, which increases the probability of conduction failure − a well documented characteristic of demyelinated axons. Potassium channel blockade has the effect of increasing axonal action potential propagation and improving the probability of synaptic vesicle release. A study has shown that 4-AP is a potent calcium channel activator and can improve synaptic and neuromuscular function by directly acting on the calcium channel beta subunit.

MS patients treated with 4-AP exhibited a response rate of 29.5% to 80%. A long-term study (32 months) indicated that 80-90% of patients who initially responded to 4-AP exhibited long-term benefits. Although improving symptoms, 4-AP does not inhibit progression of MS. Another study, conducted in Brazil, showed that treatment based on fampridine was considered efficient in 70% of the patients.

==== Spinal cord injury ====
Spinal cord injury patients have also seen improvement with 4-AP therapy. These improvements include sensory, motor and pulmonary function, with a decrease in spasticity and pain.

==== KCNA2-related disorders ====
4-Aminopyridine is a gene-targeted therapy option for KCNA2-related disorders with a gain-of-function (GOF) or some mix-of-function (MOF) gene mutations. It has shown to improve seizure control, gait, ataxia, alertness, and cognition. GOF KCNA2 disorders are caused by voltage-gated potassium channels in the central nervous system that stay open and allow too much flow of potassium currents. Some MOF KCNA2 disorders also act like GOF in regards to their flow of potassium through the channel which is why they may also benefit from 4-AP therapy. 4-AP acts by closing these channels and improves the natural flow of potassium through the neuron.

As of 2025 the use of 4-AP for KCNA2 is in an experimental stage, but it has shown significant improvement for most patients that have used it. Out of 13 documented patients, eight became seizure free, two others experienced a reduction in seizures, and 11 had improved gait, ataxia, alertness, cognition, or speech. Only one patient experienced side effects of increased seizures and no other symptoms were reported.

Authors of the first 4-AP KCNA2 study created an online tool to guide physicians in identifying which KCNA2 patients would benefit from this therapy. It is publicly accessible due to the importance for treating this disease from young age. See the article for details on accessing this information.

==== Tetrodotoxin poisoning ====
Clinical studies have shown that 4-AP is capable of reversing the effects of tetrodotoxin poisoning in animals, however, its effectiveness as an antidote in humans has not yet been determined.

=== Overdose ===
Case reports have shown that overdoses with 4-AP can lead to paresthesias, seizures, and atrial fibrillation.

== Contraindications ==
4-aminopyridine is excreted by the kidneys. 4-AP should not be given to people with significant kidney disease (e.g., acute kidney injury or advanced chronic kidney disease) due to the higher risk of seizures with increased circulating levels of 4-AP.

== Branding ==
The drug was originally intended, by Acorda Therapeutics, to have the brand name Amaya, however the name was changed to Ampyra to avoid potential confusion with other marketed pharmaceuticals.

Four of Acorda's patents pertaining to Ampyra were invalidated in 2017 by the United States District Court for the District of Delaware and a fifth patent expired in 2018. Since then, generic alternatives have been developed for the U.S. market.

The drug is marketed by Biogen Idec in Canada as Fampyra and as Dalstep in India by Sun Pharma.

== Research ==
=== Parkinson's disease ===
Dalfampridine completed Phase II clinical trials for Parkinson's disease in July 2014.

== See also ==
- 4-Dimethylaminopyridine, a popular laboratory reagent, is prepared directly from pyridine instead of via methylating this compound.
- Pyridine
- 4-Pyridylnicotinamide, useful as a ligand in coordination chemistry, is prepared by the reaction of this compound with nicotinoyl chloride.
