= 3-Aminopyridine =

Names
- Preferred IUPAC name Pyridin-3-amine
- Other names 3-Pyridinamine; 3-Pyridylamine

Identifiers
CAS Number	462-08-8
3D model (JSmol)	Interactive image
ChEMBL	ChEMBL25541
ChemSpider	9615
ECHA InfoCard	100.006.658
EC Number	207-322-2
PubChem CID	10009
UNII	69JE8P2L84
CompTox Dashboard (EPA)	DTXSID9047461
- InChI: InChI=1S/C5H6N2/c6-5-2-1-3-7-4-5/h1-4H,6H2 Key: CUYKNJBYIJFRCU-UHFFFAOYSA-N
- SMILES: C1=CC(=CN=C1)N

Properties
Chemical formula	C_{5}H_{6}N_{2}
Molar mass	94.117 g·mol^{−1}
- Appearance
Melting point	65 °C (149 °F; 338 K)
Boiling point	248 °C (478 °F; 521 K)
Solubility in water	>1,000g/l
Solubility in alcohol and benzene	Soluble

Hazards
- GHS labelling
Pictograms	(GHS06: Toxic) (GHS07: Exclamation mark) (GHS08: Health hazard)
Signal word	Danger
Hazard statements	H301, H311, H315, H319, H331, H335, H373
Precautionary statements	P260, P262, P264, P264+P265, P270, P271, P273, P280, P301+P316, P302+P352, P304+P340, P305+P351+P338, P316, P319, P321, P330, P332+P317, P337+P317, P361+P364, P362+P364, P391, P403+P233, P405, P501
Flash point	124 °C (255 °F; 397 K)
Autoignition temperature	628 °C (1,162 °F; 901 K)
- Except where otherwise noted, data are given for materials in their standard state (at 25 °C [77 °F], 100 kPa). verify (what is ?) Infobox references

3-Aminopyridine is an aminopyridine. It is a colorless solid.

== Preparation ==
3-Aminopyridine is prepared by heating nicotinamide with sodium hypobromite (Hofmann rearrangement), which is in turn prepared in situ by the reaction of sodium hydroxide and bromine at 70 °C.

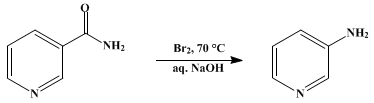

It can be used in the synthesis of organic ligand 3-pyridylnicotinamide. Troxipide is another synthesis that uses 3-AP.

== Toxicity ==
The acute toxicity is indicated by the LD_{50} = 178 mg/kg (quail, oral).
