= KCNA2-related disorders =

Group of genetic disorders

KCNA2-related disorders are caused by mutations to the Kv1.2 channels encoded by the KCNA2 gene. These neurological disorders are associated with a spectrum of symptoms including seizures, developmental and epileptic encephalopathies, cognitive and intellectual disabilities, and movement and motor disorders.

Diagnosis of KCNA2-related disorders comes from genetic testing, usually completed after signs of seizures, missed developmental milestones, or unusual motor development. The vast majority of cases are de novo mutations and all occur in the voltage-gated potassium channel KCNA2 causing too much, too little, or a mixed effect of excitability in the neurons of the brain. There is no cure, but 4-aminopyridine is a targeted drug therapy that has been studied to help treat gain-of-function and some mix-of-function mutations. Management of the disease includes anti-epileptic medications to control seizures and therapies to assist with development.

== Signs and symptoms ==
The most common first signs of KCNA2-related disorders are seizures which usually occur within the first two years of life. Epilepsy is the most prominent symptom with 84% of patients reporting multiple seizures. Seizure types include generalized tonic-clonic seizures, focal seizures, febrile seizures, absence seizures, and myoclonic seizures and most patients experience more than one type. Other common symptoms include: developmental delays, cognitive and language impairments, cerebellar involvement, and behavioral disorders.

=== Seizures ===
Seizure onset and seizure type varies with the phenotype of KCNA2 epilepsy. Loss-of-function (LOF) variants have a mean age of onset of 17 months with mostly focal seizures. Gain-of-function (GOF) variants have a slightly earlier onset between 3 and 19 months with mostly generalized seizures. Febrile seizures occur more frequently with the LOF and GOF variants, and rarely with the MOF variants.

=== Movement and motor disorders ===
Ataxia, dystonia, tremors, myoclonus, dyskinesia, hypertonia, and hypotonia have all been identified across KCNA2 disorders. Ataxia is the most common movement disorder reported across all types of KCNA2 disorders, with nearly all GOF patients experiencing a more severe form of this symptom.

=== Developmental and cognitive delays ===
Delays in development occur in most cases of KCNA2-related disorders but differ in onset and severity. LOF variants tend to have better development before seizure onset and more mild versions of intellectual and developmental disabilities (IDD). GOF and MOF variants typically show more moderate to severe IDD with the MOF types showing the most severe.

=== Behavioral disorders ===
Some individuals with KCNA2-related disorders have also been diagnosed with autism and attention deficit hyperactivity disorder, but the numbers are small and more data is necessary.

== Causes ==
KCNA2-related disorders are caused by mutations to the KCNA2 voltage-gated potassium channel gene. It is an autosomal dominant genetic disorder, but most cases are de novo. The majority of mutations are missense variations and they result in either a gain-of-function, loss-of-function, or mix-of-function effect in the channel. Studies have shown these variations of channel function cause three distinct phenotypes.

== Diagnosis ==
KCNA2-related disorders are diagnosed based on genetic testing. The result can come from an epilepsy gene panel, whole exome sequencing, or whole genome sequencing, the latter of which is the most comprehensive and informative of an individual's genetic makeup.

=== Imaging ===
Initially, individuals will likely experience seizures as their first sign and typically this is followed by an electroencephalogram (EEG) exam, leading to a general diagnosis of epilepsy. To further investigate the cause of the epilepsy, genetic testing occurs and this is when the KCNA2 mutation would be found. MRIs might also be used when determining the extent of the condition, however, these are usually normal early on in life. Brain abnormalities typically occur with most GOF and MOF phenotypes as the disease progresses, whereas many LOF individuals have normal MRIs.

== Treatment ==
There is currently no cure, but one promising treatment exists for GOF variants and some MOF variants called 4-aminopyridine. Management of the disease typically involves anti-epileptic medications, often needing more than one to control seizures. Management of these disorders also includes but is not limited to therapies such as: physical therapy, speech therapy, and occupational therapy.

== Prognosis ==
KCNA2-related disorders are extremely heterogenous in their presentation and therefore difficult to make conclusions on the overall prognosis. There is, however, varying severities of the identified phenotypes which likely lead to differences in outcomes. LOF mutations typically present as more mild cases and have shown more favorable outcomes including better or complete seizure control, normal MRIs, and less comorbidities compared to GOF and MOF mutations. In contrast, the GOF and MOF phenotype typically has a more moderate to severe effect due to difficult to control seizures, cerebellar atrophy, and motor disorders.

== History ==
In 2015, mutations to the KCNA2 gene were first recognized to cause epileptic encephalopathy. Shortly after, KCNA2 was included on epilepsy gene panels and could be identified through genetic testing. In 2015, a private Facebook group was established to connect KCNA2 families around the world. Then in 2020, KCNA2 Epilepsy, Inc. was established as a 501c3 non-profit organization with a mission to support families facing KCNA2-related disorders and further research to better understand and treat the disease.

Experimental treatment using 4-aminopyridine began in 2016 and then was more widely used after a published study on its effects.

== Research and potential therapies ==
Active research is taking place around the globe on KCNA2-related disorders. There are varying approaches in how to best treat these disorders. Small molecules are being tested on human KCNA2 induced pluripotent stem cell lines (iPSC) and animal models. Repurposed drugs are being scanned as potential treatment options. The first KCNA2 variant specific antisense oligonucleotide (ASO) has also been created and tested. Much more research and testing is needed to identify successful treatment options for this ultra-rare disease.

== Advocacy ==
The KCNA2 Epilepsy, Inc. foundation advocates for individuals with KCNA2-related disorders by bringing the community together through online social groups and scientific convenings. The organization supports KCNA2 research through annual grants.
