= Cis-Dichlorobis(bipyridine)ruthenium(II) =

cis-Dichlorobis(bipyridine)ruthenium(II)

Identifiers
CAS Number	monohydrate: 98014-14-3; dihydrate: 19542-80-4
3D model (JSmol)	monohydrate: Interactive image; dihydrate: Interactive image
ChemSpider	monohydrate: 17339772; dihydrate: 2016292
PubChem CID	monohydrate: 16211844; dihydrate: 2734543
CompTox Dashboard (EPA)	DTXSID50583494
- InChI: monohydrate: InChI=1S/2C10H8N2.2ClH.H2O.Ru/c2*1-3-7-11-9(5-1)10-6-2-4-8-12-10;;;;/h2*1-8H;2*1H;1H2;/q;;;;;+2/p-2 Key: XBOQABVNRXVAKI-UHFFFAOYSA-L; dihydrate: InChI=1S/2C10H8N2.2ClH.2H2O.Ru/c2*1-3-7-11-9(5-1)10-6-2-4-8-12-10;;;;;/h2*1-8H;2*1H;2*1H2;/q;;;;;;+2/p-2 Key: NHKTUSUPCAKVHT-UHFFFAOYSA-L
- SMILES: monohydrate: [n+]12ccccc1c1cccc[n+1]1[Ru-4]23(Cl)(Cl)[n+]1ccccc1c1cccc[n+1]13.O; dihydrate: [n+]12ccccc1c1cccc[n+1]1[Ru-4]23(Cl)(Cl)[n+]1ccccc1c1cccc[n+1]13.O.O

Properties
Chemical formula	C_{20}H_{16}Cl_{2}N_{4}Ru
Molar mass	484.35 g·mol^{−1}
Appearance	dark green solid
Density	1.59 g/cm^{3}

Hazards
- GHS labelling
Pictograms	(GHS07: Exclamation mark)
Signal word	Warning
Hazard statements	H315, H319, H335
Precautionary statements	P261, P264, P271, P280, P302+P352, P304+P340, P305+P351+P338, P312, P321, P332+P313, P337+P313, P362, P403+P233, P405, P501
- Except where otherwise noted, data are given for materials in their standard state (at 25 °C [77 °F], 100 kPa). Infobox references

cis-Dichlorobis(bipyridine)ruthenium(II) is the coordination complex with the formula RuCl_{2}(bipy)_{2}, where bipy is 2,2'-bipyridine. It is a dark green diamagnetic solid that is a precursor to many other complexes of ruthenium, mainly by substitution of the two chloride ligands. The compound has been crystallized as diverse hydrates. It is a precursor to tris(bipyridine)ruthenium(II) chloride

== Synthesis and structure ==
The complex is prepared by heating a DMF solution of ruthenium trichloride and bipyridine.

With octahedral coordination geometry, the complex exists exclusively as the chiral cis isomer. The corresponding Ru(III) salts are also known.
