= Charge-transfer band =

Characteristic feature of the optical spectra of many compounds

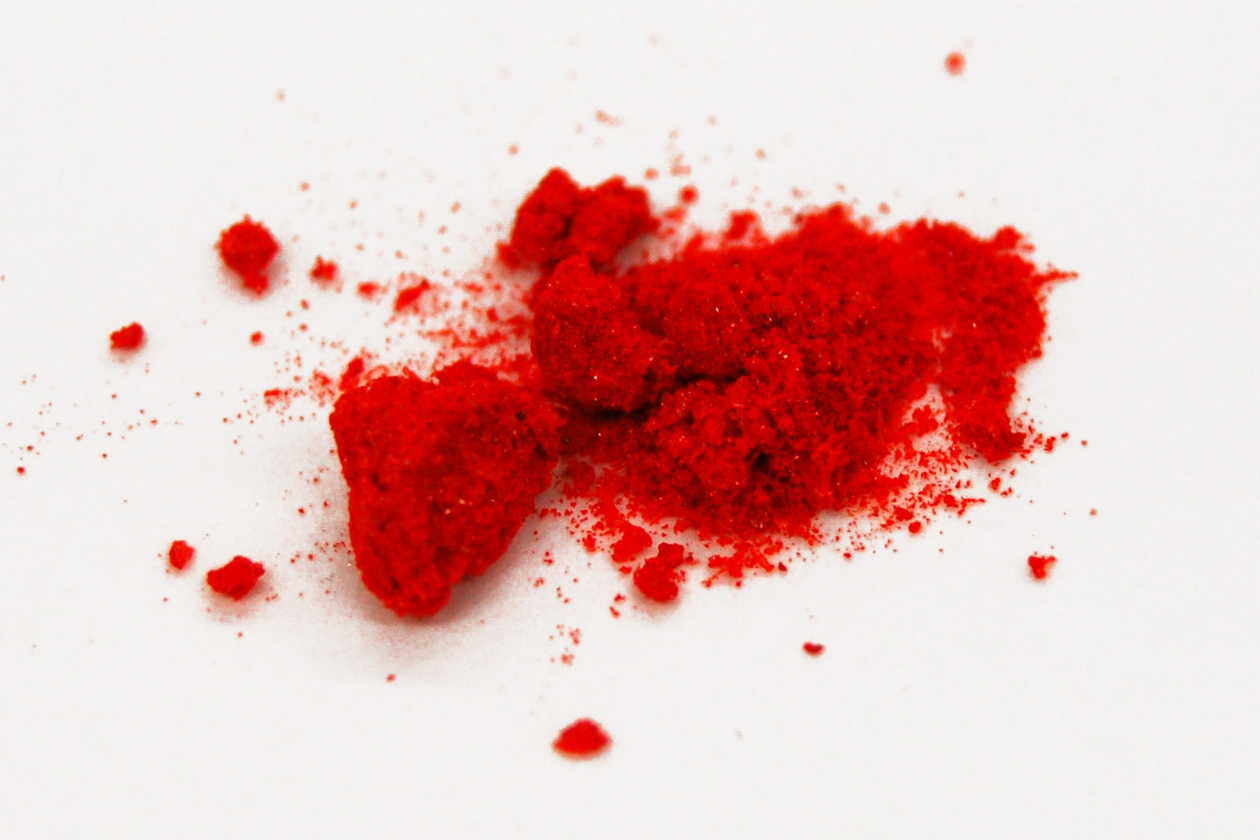
The intense color of tris(bipyridine)ruthenium(II) arises from a metal-to-ligand charge-transfer band.

Charge-transfer bands are a characteristic feature of the optical spectra of many compounds. These bands are typically more intense than d–d transitions. They typically exhibit solvatochromism, consistent with shifts of electron density that would be sensitive to solvation.

CT absorptions bands are intense and often lie in the ultraviolet or visible portion of the spectrum. For coordination complexes, charge-transfer bands often exhibit molar absorptivities, ε, of about 50000 L mol^{−1} cm^{−1}. By contrast ε values for d–d transitions are in the range of 20–200 L mol^{−1} cm^{−1}. CT transitions are spin-allowed and Laporte-allowed. The weaker d–d transitions are potentially spin-allowed but always Laporte-forbidden.

Charge-transfer bands of transition metal complexes result from shift of charge density between molecular orbitals (MO) that are predominantly metal in character and those that are predominantly ligand in character. If the transfer occurs from the MO with ligand-like character to the metal-like one, the transition is called a ligand-to-metal charge-transfer (LMCT). If the electronic charge shifts from the MO with metal-like character to the ligand-like one, the band is called a metal-to-ligand charge-transfer (MLCT). Thus, a MLCT results in oxidation of the metal center, whereas a LMCT results in the reduction of the metal center.

== Case studies ==
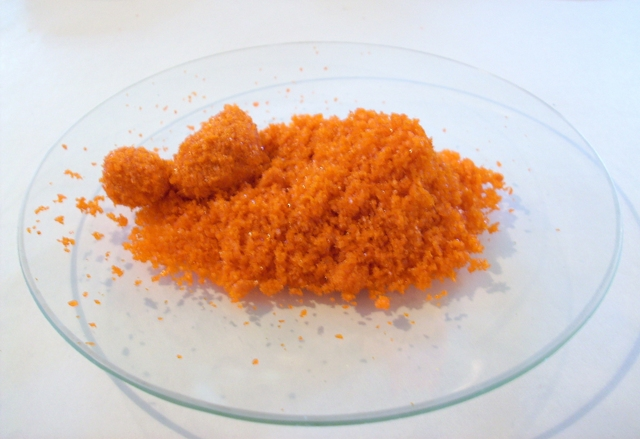
Sample of sodium dichromate. Its orange color arises from LMCT bands, involving transfer of electron from an oxide-dominated state to a metal-dominated state.

=== IrBr_{6}^{3-/2-} ===
In IrBr_{6}^{3-}, the optical spectrum of this d^{6} octahedral complex exhibits an intense absorption near 250 nm corresponding to a transition from ligand σ MO to the empty e_{g} MO. In IrBr_{6}^{2-}, which is a d^{5} complex, two absorptions, one near 600 nm and another near 270 nm, are observed. These are assigned as two LMCT bands, one to t_{2g} and another to e_{g}. The 600 nm band corresponds to transition to the t_{2g} MO and the 270 nm band to the e_{g} MO.

Charge transfer bands may also arise from transfer of electrons from nonbonding orbitals of the ligand to the e_{g} MO.

==== d^{0} oxometallates ====
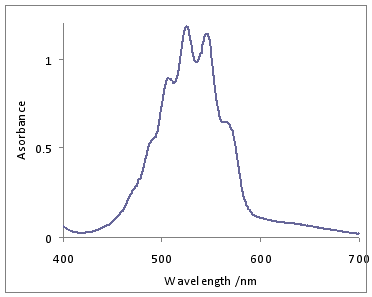
Absorption spectrum of an aqueous solution of potassium permanganate, showing a vibronic fine structure in the LMCT band.

The tetraoxides of d^{0} metal centers are often deeply colored for the first row metals. This coloration is assigned to LMCT, involving transfer of nonbonding electrons on the oxo ligands to empty d-levels on the metal. For heavier metals, these same transitions occur in the UV region, hence no color is observed. Hence perrhenate, tungstate, and molybdate are colorless.

The energies of transitions correlate with the order of the electrochemical series. The metal ions that are most easily reduced correspond to the lowest energy transitions. The above trend is consistent with transfer of electrons from the ligand to the metal, thus resulting in a reduction of metal ions by the ligand.

=== Polypyridine complexes ===
Complexes of bipyridine, phenanthroline, and related unsaturated heterocycles often exhibit strong C-T bands. Most famous is Ru(bipy)_{3}^{2+}, which upon irradiation gives excited states described as [Ru(III)(bipy^{−})(bipy)_{2}]^{2+}. The CT excited state is long-lived, allowing a rich chemistry ensues.

=== Mixed valence complexes ===
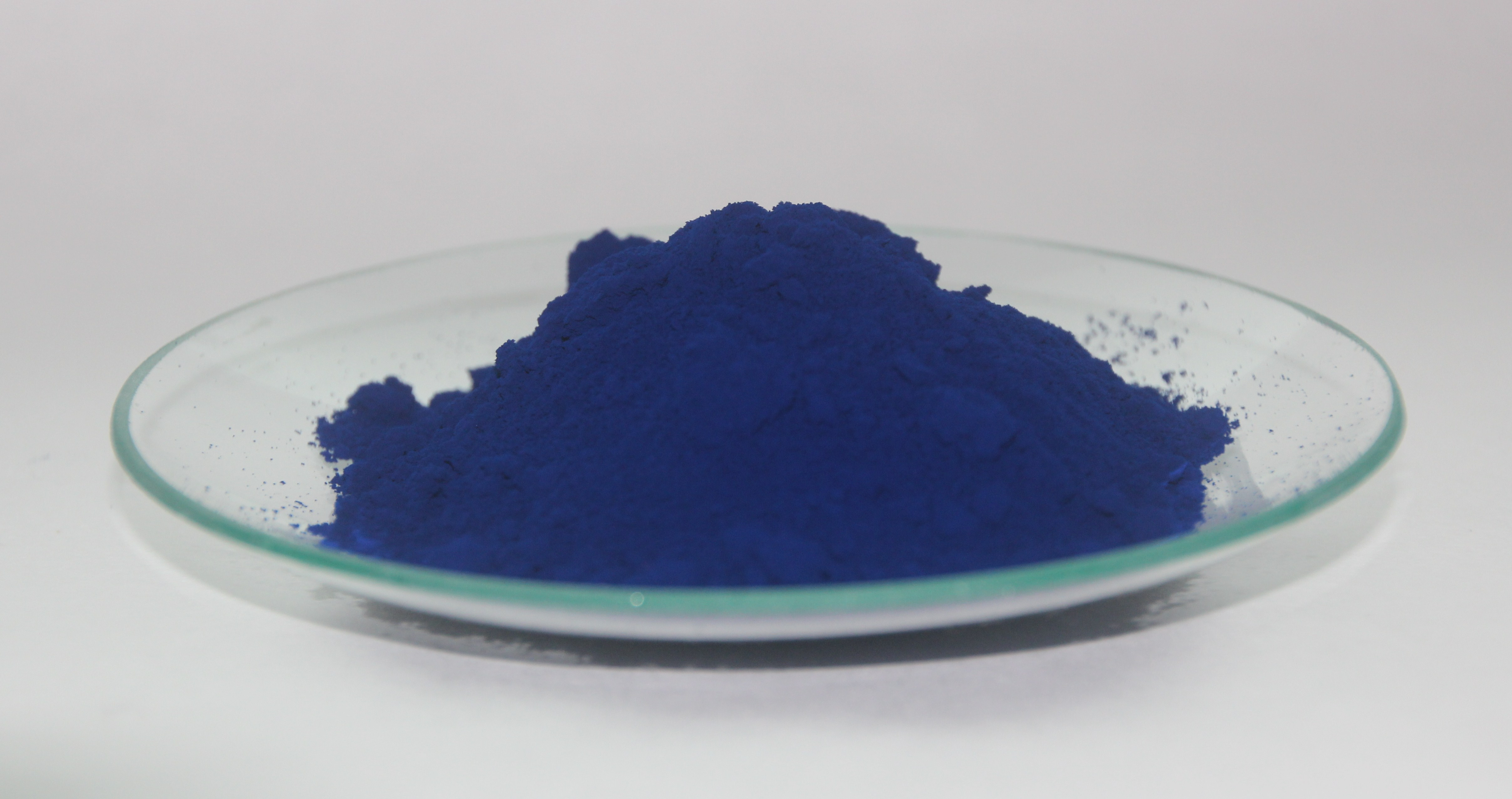
Prussian blue is intensely blue owing to an intervalence charge transfer band.

Intervalence charge transfer (IVCT) is a type of charge-transfer band that is associated with mixed-valence compounds. Unlike the usual MLCT or LMCT bands, the IVCT bands are lower in energy, usually in the visible or near-infrared region of the spectrum and is broad. Prussian blue, the blue pigment derived from Fe(III), Fe(II), and cyanide, owes its intense color to IVCT.
