= Iron(II) tetrafluoroborate =

Names
- IUPAC name Iron(II) tetrafluoroborate
- Other names: Ferrous tetrafluoroborate

Identifiers
CAS Number	(anhydrous): 15283-51-9
3D model (JSmol)	(anhydrous): Interactive image
ChemSpider	(anhydrous): 9911059
ECHA InfoCard	100.035.736
EC Number	(anhydrous): 239-327-0
PubChem CID	(anhydrous): 11736352; (hexahydrate): 15762351
CompTox Dashboard (EPA)	(anhydrous): DTXSID30884830
- InChI: InChI=1S/2BF4.Fe/c2*2-1(3,4)5;/q2*-1;+2 Key: GXZXLFFLHJJJLX-UHFFFAOYSA-N
- SMILES: (anhydrous): [B-](F)(F)(F)F.[B-](F)(F)(F)F.[Fe+2]

Properties
Chemical formula	Fe(BF_{4})_{2}
Molar mass	229.46 g/mol (anhydrous); 337.55 g/mol (hexahydrate)
Appearance	Light green crystals (hexahydrate)
Solubility in water	Soluble

Hazards
- GHS labelling
Pictograms	(GHS07: Exclamation mark) (GHS05: Corrosive)
Signal word	Danger
Hazard statements	H302, H312, H314, H332
Precautionary statements	P260, P264, P270, P271, P280, P301+P312, P301+P330+P331, P302+P352, P303+P361+P353, P304+P312, P304+P340, P305+P351+P338, P310, P312, P321, P322, P330, P363, P405, P501
- Except where otherwise noted, data are given for materials in their standard state (at 25 °C [77 °F], 100 kPa). Infobox references

Iron(II) tetrafluoroborate or ferrous tetrafluoroborate is an inorganic chemical with chemical formula Fe(BF_{4})_{2}. Both the anhydrous form and a hexahydrate are known. The hexahydrate and aqueous solutions are green. Tetrafluoroborate is generally a weakly coordinating anion, so iron(II) tetrafluoroborate is used as the starting material for forming various other iron(II) coordination complexes.

For example, a complex composed of iron(II) tetrafluoroborate and the ligand tris[2-(diphenylphosphino)-ethyl]phosphine catalyzes the transfer hydrogenation of various aldehydes to give the corresponding primary alcohols, using formic acid as hydrogen donor.
