= Dimethyl-2,2'-bipyridine =

Structure of 4,4'-dimethyl-2,2'-bipyridine.

Dimethyl-2,2'-bipyridine can refer to many isomers of 2,2'-bipyridine containing two methyl substituents. All have the formula (CH_{3})_{2}C_{10}H_{6}N_{2}, but the most common are symmetrical derivatives (CH_{3}C_{5}H_{3}N)_{2} listed below. These compounds are used as ligands in coordination chemistry and homogeneous catalysis. They are white or colorless. Most are solids except the 3,3' isomer which is a liquid.

Common isomers
Compound	Registry number	Melting/boiling point (°C)
4,4'-dimethyl-2,2'-bipyridine	1134-35-6	171–172
5,5'-dimethyl-2,2'-bipyridine	1762-34-1	114.5–115
6,6'-dimethyl-2,2'-bipyridine	4411-80-7	89.5–90.5
3,3'-dimethyl-2,2'-bipyridine	1762-32-9	293–298
