= 3-Pyridylnicotinamide =

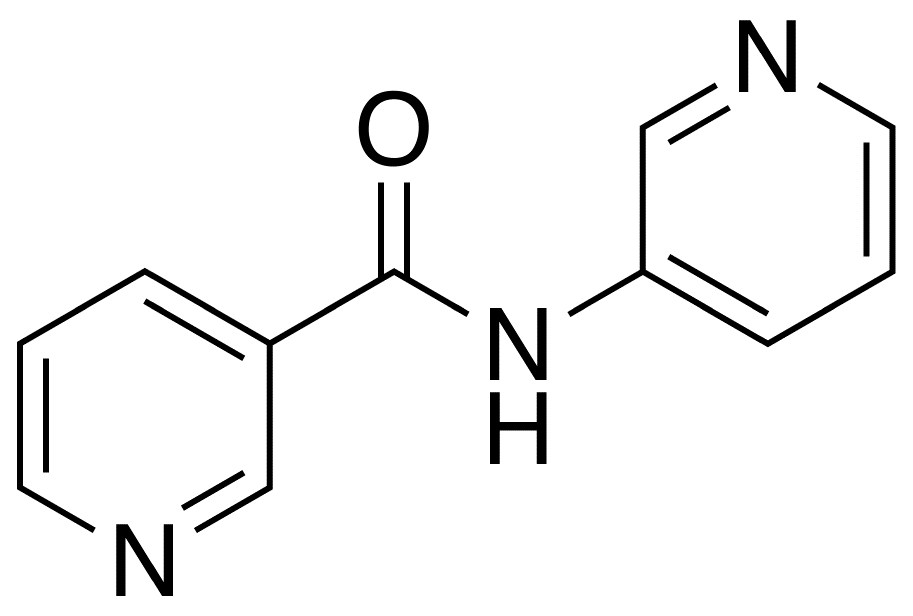
- 3-pyridylnicotinamide

Names
- Preferred IUPAC name N-(Pyridin-3-yl)pyridine-3-carboxamide
- Other names 3-pna 3-pyridinecarboxamide, N-3-pyridinyl- N-(Pyridin-3-yl)nicotinamide

Identifiers
CAS Number	13160-06-0
3D model (JSmol)	Interactive image
ChEMBL	ChEMBL1358838
ChemSpider	175548
PubChem CID	202725
UNII	M9RK4LD77M
CompTox Dashboard (EPA)	DTXSID00157124
- InChI: InChI=1S/C11H9N3O/c15-11(9-3-1-5-12-7-9)14-10-4-2-6-13-8-10/h1-8H,(H,14,15) Key: HMCAHAHCCWFPOF-UHFFFAOYSA-N
- SMILES: O=C(Nc1cccnc1)c2cccnc2

Properties
Chemical formula	C_{11}H_{9}N_{3}O
Molar mass	199.20 g/mol
Density	1.287 g/cm^{3}
Boiling point	286.08 °C (546.94 °F; 559.23 K)

Structure
Dipole moment	0 D

Hazards
Flash point	127 °C (261 °F; 400 K)

Related compounds
Related compounds	4,4'-bipyridine Pyridine; Nicotinamide; 3-Aminopyridine; 4-Pyridylnicotinamide
- Except where otherwise noted, data are given for materials in their standard state (at 25 °C [77 °F], 100 kPa). verify (what is ?) Infobox references

The organic compound 3-pyridylnicotinamide (3-pna), also known as N-(pyridin-3-yl)nicotinamide, is a kinked dipodal dipyridine that is synthesized through the reaction of nicotinoyl chloride and 3-aminopyridine. The nitrogen atoms on its pyridine rings, like those of its isomer 4-pyridylnicotinamide, can donate their electron lone pairs to metal cations, allowing it to bridge metal centers and act as a bidentate ligand in coordination polymers. It can be used to synthesize polymers that have potentially useful gas adsorption properties.
