= Nicotinoyl chloride =

Names
- IUPAC name Pyridine-3-carbonyl chloride
- Other names: Nicotinic acid chloride; 3-Pyridinecarbonyl chloride

Identifiers
CAS Number	10400-19-8
3D model (JSmol)	Interactive image
ChemSpider	74545
ECHA InfoCard	100.030.773
EC Number	233-863-9
PubChem CID	82604
UNII	7Y3X2E4XUG
CompTox Dashboard (EPA)	DTXSID40146214
- InChI: InChI=1S/C6H4ClNO/c7-6(9)5-2-1-3-8-4-5/h1-4H Key: ATBIAJXSKNPHEI-UHFFFAOYSA-N
- SMILES: C1=CC(=CN=C1)C(=O)Cl

Properties
Chemical formula	C_{6}H_{4}ClNO
Molar mass	141.55 g·mol^{−1}
Density	1.298±0.06 g/cm³
Melting point	188-194
Boiling point	110–113 °C (230–235 °F; 383–386 K) (25-26 mmHg)

Hazards
- Occupational safety and health (OHS/OSH)
Main hazards	Corrosive (H314); causes severe skin burns and eye damage
Flash point	96 °C (205 °F; 369 K)
- Except where otherwise noted, data are given for materials in their standard state (at 25 °C [77 °F], 100 kPa). Infobox references

Nicotinoyl chloride (also known as nicotinyl chloride or pyridine-3-carbonyl chloride) is an organic compound with the chemical formula C_{6}H_{4}ClNO. It is the acyl chloride derivative of nicotinic acid (pyridine-3-carboxylic acid, also known as niacin or vitamin B_{3}).

== Preparation ==
Nicotinyl chloride is prepared by treating potassium nicotinate suspended in anhydrous benzene with oxalyl chloride solution at low temperature, then heating to reflux. The by-products (carbon dioxide, carbon monoxide, and potassium chloride) are readily removed, and the product is isolated by distillation.
