= 2,2′-Biquinoline =

Names
- Preferred IUPAC name 2,2′-Biquinoline
- Other names 2,2′-Biquinolyl; 2-Quinolin-2-ylquinoline; Cuproin

Identifiers
CAS Number	119-91-5
3D model (JSmol)	Interactive image
ChemSpider	8105
ECHA InfoCard	100.003.961
EC Number	204-357-5
PubChem CID	8412
UNII	6RO6GA6RP3
CompTox Dashboard (EPA)	DTXSID8059500
- InChI: InChI=1S/C18H12N2/c1-3-7-15-13(5-1)9-11-17(19-15)18-12-10-14-6-2-4-8-16(14)20-18/h1-12H Key: WPTCSQBWLUUYDV-UHFFFAOYSA-N
- SMILES: C1=CC=C2C(=C1)C=CC(=N2)C3=NC4=CC=CC=C4C=C3

Properties
Chemical formula	C_{18}H_{12}N_{2}
Molar mass	256.308 g·mol^{−1}
Appearance	White solid
Density	1.374 g/cm^{3}
Melting point	194.5 °C (382.1 °F; 467.6 K)

Hazards
- GHS labelling
Pictograms	(GHS07: Exclamation mark)
Signal word	Warning
Hazard statements	H315, H319, H335
Precautionary statements	P261, P264, P271, P280, P302+P352, P304+P340, P305+P351+P338, P312, P321, P332+P313, P337+P313, P362, P403+P233, P405, P501
- Except where otherwise noted, data are given for materials in their standard state (at 25 °C [77 °F], 100 kPa). Infobox references

2,2′-Biquinoline is an organic compound with the formula (C_{9}H_{6}N)_{2}. It is one of several biquinolines. It is prepared by reductive coupling of 2-chloroquinoline. It is a colorimetric indicator for organolithium compounds.

== Ligand properties ==
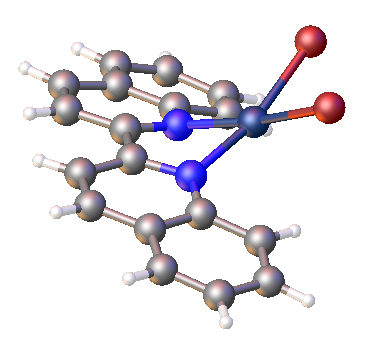
Structure of PdBr_{2}(2,2'-biquinoline).

2,2′-Biquinoline is a bidentate ligand. Unlike the related complexes of 2,2′-bipyridine, the metal does not typically occupy the plane of the biquinoline.
