= 4,4'-Bipyridine =

4,4′-Bipyridine
- 4,4′-bipyridine

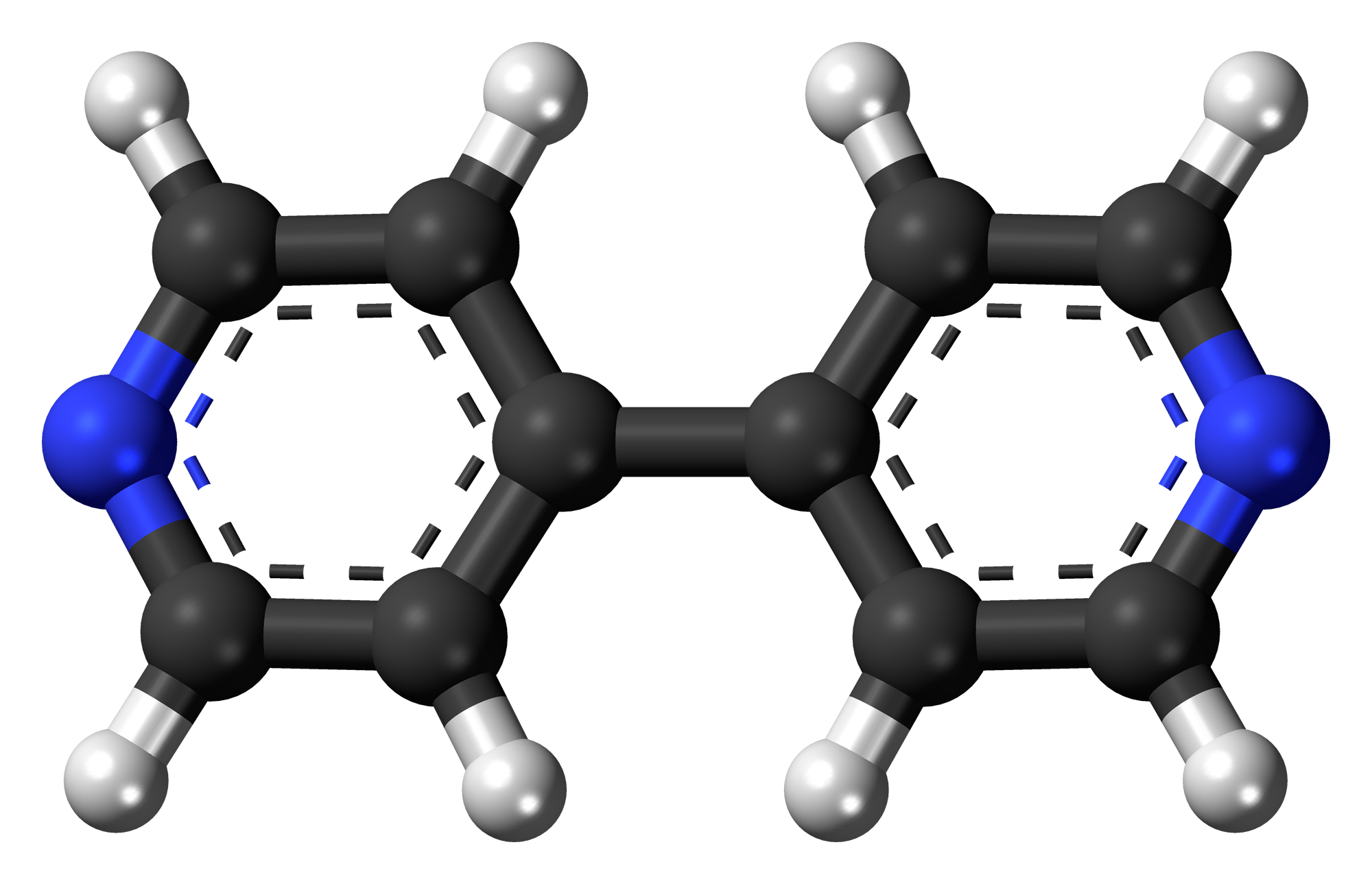

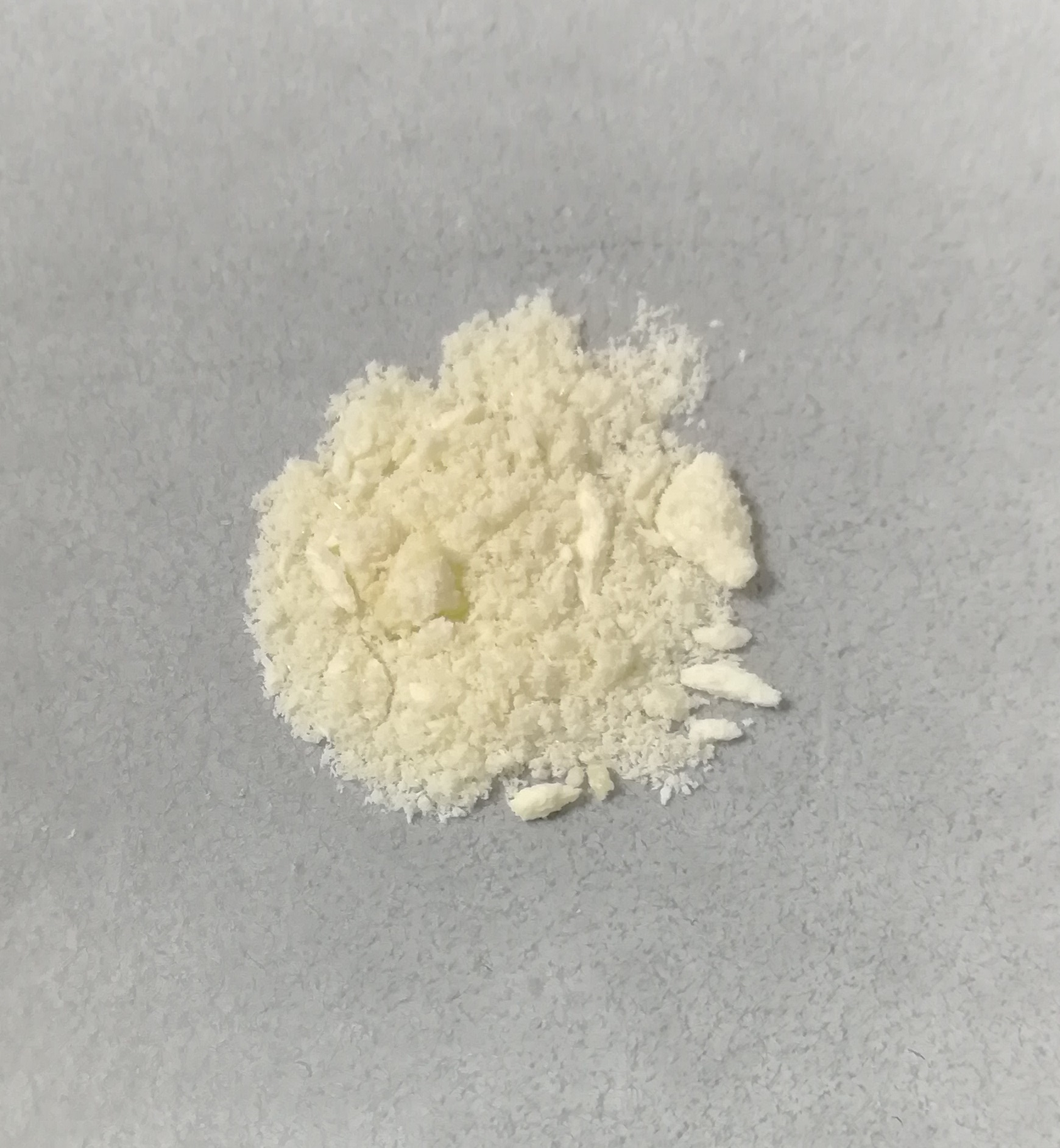

Names
- Preferred IUPAC name 4,4′-Bipyridine

Identifiers
CAS Number	553-26-4
3D model (JSmol)	Interactive image
Beilstein Reference	113176
ChEBI	CHEBI:30985
ChEMBL	ChEMBL1374568
ChemSpider	10636
ECHA InfoCard	100.008.216
EC Number	209-036-3
Gmelin Reference	3759
PubChem CID	11107
UNII	X4O2OD61CB
CompTox Dashboard (EPA)	DTXSID2027200
- InChI: InChI=1S/C10H8N2/c1-5-11-6-2-9(1)10-3-7-12-8-4-10/h1-8H Key: MWVTWFVJZLCBMC-UHFFFAOYSA-N
- SMILES: c1cnccc1-c2ccncc2

Properties
Chemical formula	C_{10}H_{8}N_{2}
Molar mass	156.188 g·mol^{−1}
Melting point	114 °C (237 °F; 387 K)
Boiling point	305 °C (581 °F; 578 K)

Structure
Dipole moment	0 D

Related compounds
Related compounds	2,2′-Bipyridine; Pyridine; 4-Pyridylnicotinamide; Terpyridine; Biphenyl
- Except where otherwise noted, data are given for materials in their standard state (at 25 °C [77 °F], 100 kPa). verify (what is ?) Infobox references

4,4′-Bipyridine (abbreviated to 4,4′-bipy or 4,4′-bpy) is an organic compound with the formula (C_{5}H_{4}N)_{2}. It is one of several isomers of bipyridine. It is a colorless solid that is soluble in organic solvents. is mainly used as a precursor to N,N′-dimethyl-4,4′-bipyridinium [(C_{5}H_{4}NCH_{3})_{2}]^{2+}, known as paraquat.

== History ==
4,4′-Bipyridine was first obtained in 1868 by the Scottish chemist Thomas Anderson via heating pyridine with sodium metal. However, Anderson's empirical formula for 4,4′-bipyridine was incorrect. The correct empirical formula, and the correct molecular structure, for 4,4′-bipyridine was provided in 1882 by the Austrian chemist Hugo Weidel and his student M. Russo.

== Uses ==
4,4'-Bipyridine is an intermediate in the production of paraquat, a widely used herbicide. In this process, pyridine is oxidized to 4,4'-bipyridine in a coupling reaction, followed by dimethylation to form paraquat. One possible interpretation of the synthesis is:

However, the Birch reduction is not performed in a distinct step from the oxidation, and the reaction may not involve complete reduction to the aminoalkane (sodium is used in excess, so the distinction cannot be deduced from stoichiometry). An alternative interpretation is an interrupted reduction: another pyridine molecule captures the Birch pyridinyl radical intermediate to give bypyridinyl, which oxygen then quenches.

== Reactions ==
The reducing agent N,N'-bis(trimethylsilyl)-4,4'-bipyridinylidene is produced by reduction of 4,4'-bipyridine in the presence of trimethylsilyl chloride (Me = CH_{3}):

NC_{5}H_{4}C_{5}H_{4}N + 2 Li + 2 Me_{3}SiCl → Me_{3}SiNC_{5}H_{4}C_{5}H_{4}NSiMe_{3} + 2 LiCl

The silylated derivative, which is red, is used in salt-free reductions.

4,4′-bipyridine forms a variety of coordination polymers.
