= 4-Pyridylnicotinamide =

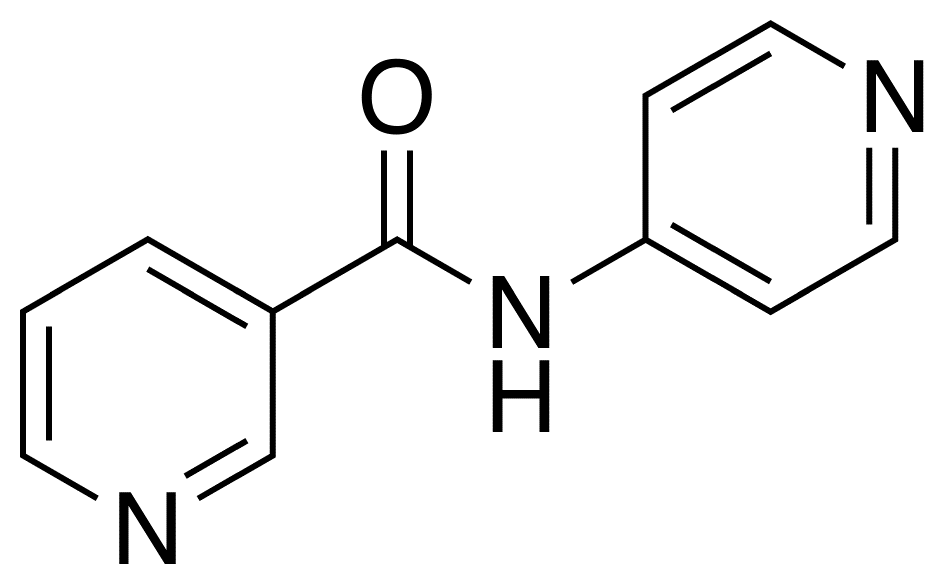
- 4-pyridylnicotinamide sketch

Names
- Preferred IUPAC name N-(Pyridin-4-yl)pyridine-3-carboxamide
- Other names 4-PNA; N-4-Pyridinyl-3-pyridinecarboxamide,; N-(Pyridin-4-yl)nicotinamide

Identifiers
CAS Number	64479-79-4
3D model (JSmol)	Interactive image
ChemSpider	2311305
PubChem CID	3049109
CompTox Dashboard (EPA)	DTXSID30214739
- InChI: InChI=1S/C11H9N3O/c15-11(9-2-1-5-13-8-9)14-10-3-6-12-7-4-10/h1-8H,(H,12,14,15) Key: HVLLFBPOFNSPRN-UHFFFAOYSA-N
- SMILES: O=C(Nc1ccncc1)c2cccnc2

Properties
Chemical formula	C_{11}H_{9}N_{3}O
Molar mass	199.213 g·mol^{−1}
Density	1.287 g/cm^{3}
Boiling point	286.08 °C (546.94 °F; 559.23 K)

Structure
Dipole moment	0 D

Related compounds
Related compounds	4,4'-bipyridine Pyridine; Nicotinamide; 4-Aminopyridine; 3-Pyridylnicotinamide
- Except where otherwise noted, data are given for materials in their standard state (at 25 °C [77 °F], 100 kPa). verify (what is ?) Infobox references

4-Pyridylnicotinamide (4-PNA), also known as N-(pyridin-4-yl)nicotinamide, is a kinked dipodal dipyridine which was originally developed for use in chemotherapy. As in its isomer 3-pyridylnicotinamide, the nitrogen atoms on its pyridine rings can donate their electron lone pairs to metal cations, allowing it to bridge metal centers and act as a bidentate ligand in coordination polymers. It is synthesized through the reaction of nicotinoyl chloride and 4-aminopyridine.
