= 2,2′-Bipyridine =

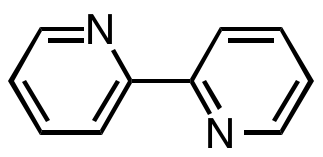

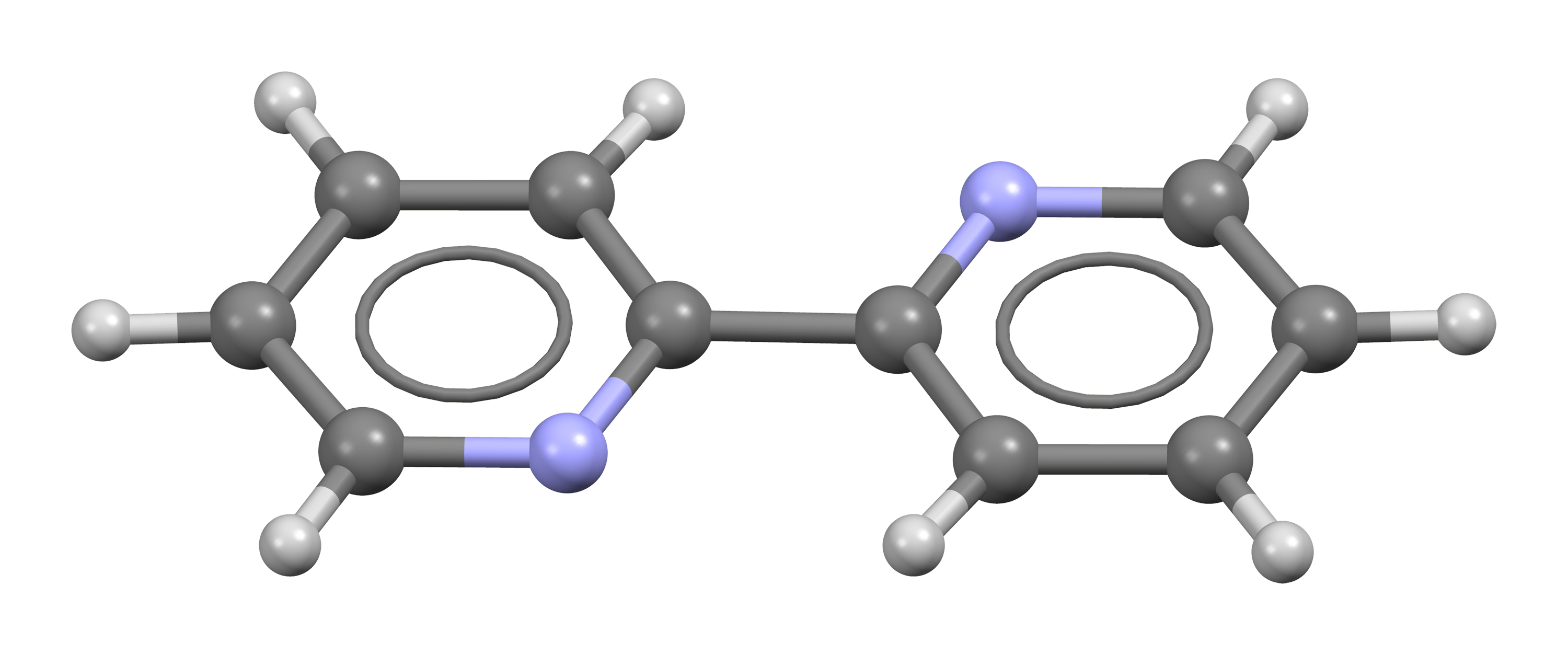

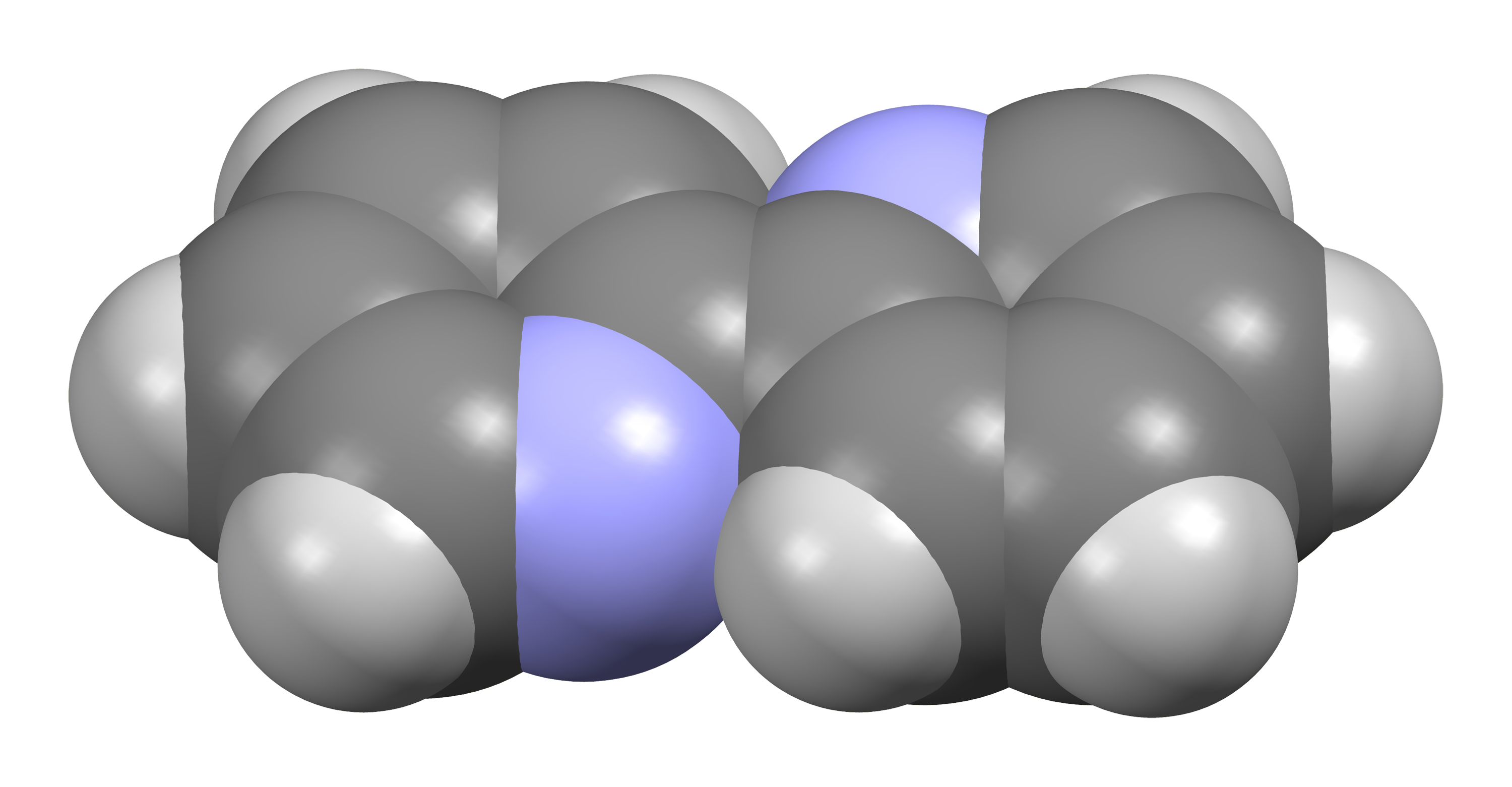

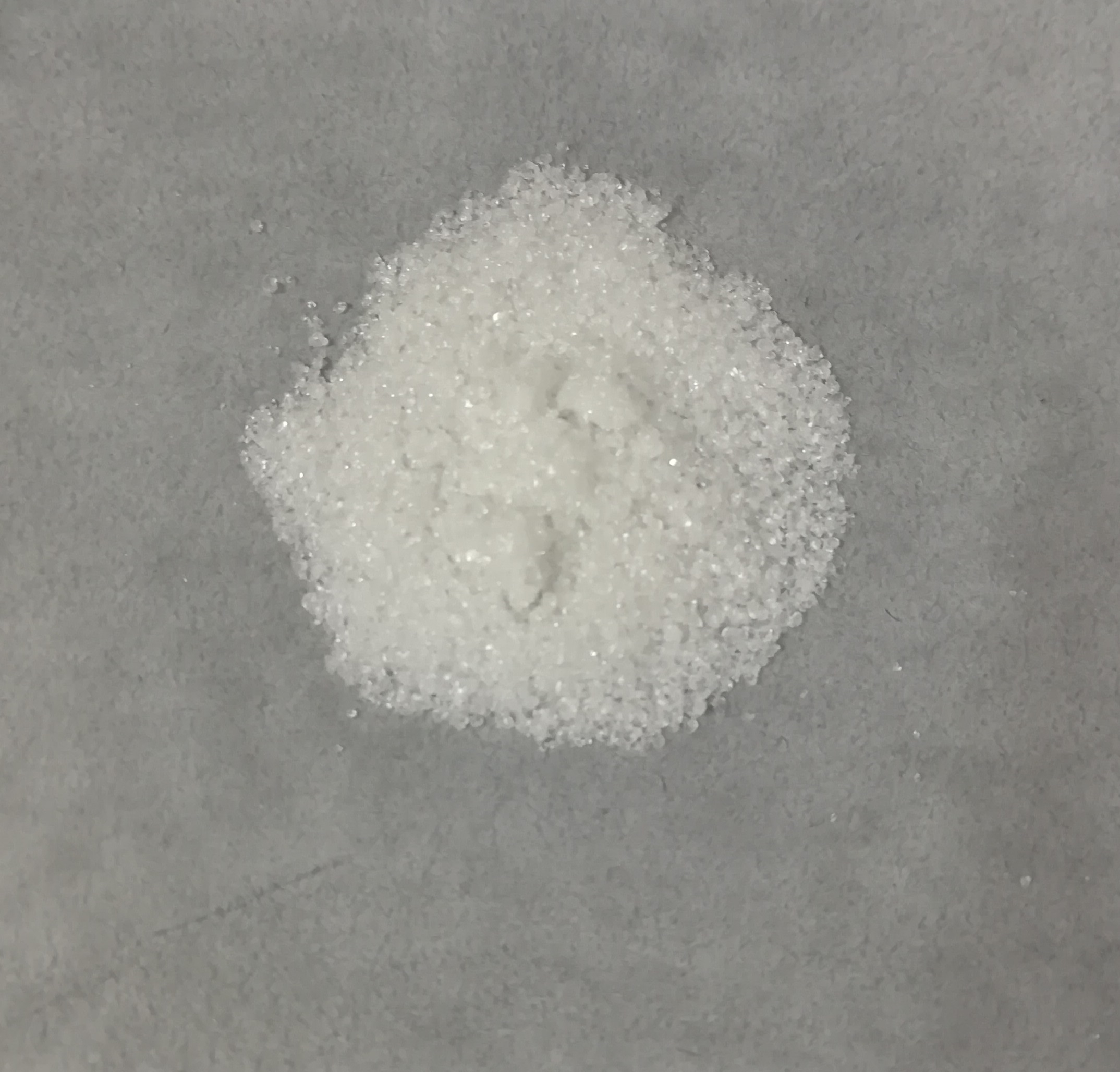

Names
- Preferred IUPAC name 2,2′-Bipyridine
- Other names Bipyridyl; Dipyridyl; Bipy; Bpy; Dipy

Identifiers
| CAS Number | 366-18-7 |
| 3D model (JSmol) | Interactive image |
| Beilstein Reference | 113089 |
| ChEBI | CHEBI:30351 |
| ChEMBL | ChEMBL39879 |
| ChemSpider | 13867714 |
| ECHA InfoCard | 100.006.069 |
| EC Number | 206-674-4 923-456-0 |
| Gmelin Reference | 3720 936807 |
| PubChem CID | 1474 |
| RTECS number | DW1750000 |
| UNII | 551W113ZEP |
| CompTox Dashboard (EPA) | DTXSID9040635 |
- InChI: InChI=1S/C10H8N2/c1-3-7-11-9(5-1)10-6-2-4-8-12-10/h1-8H Key: ROFVEXUMMXZLPA-UHFFFAOYSA-N; InChI=1/C10H8N2/c1-3-7-11-9(5-1)10-6-2-4-8-12-10/h1-8H Key: ROFVEXUMMXZLPA-UHFFFAOYAP
- SMILES: n1ccccc1-c2ccccn2

Properties
| Chemical formula | (C_{5}H_{4}N)_{2} |
| Molar mass | 156.188 g·mol^{−1} |
| Appearance | Colorless solid |
| Melting point | 70 to 73 °C (158 to 163 °F; 343 to 346 K) |
| Boiling point | 273 °C (523 °F; 546 K) |

Structure
| Dipole moment | 0 D |

Hazards
- Occupational safety and health (OHS/OSH)
| Main hazards | toxic |
- GHS labelling
| Pictograms | (GHS06: Toxic) (GHS07: Exclamation mark) |
| Signal word | Danger |
| Hazard statements | H301, H302, H311, H312, H319, H412 |
| Precautionary statements | P264, P270, P273, P280, P301+P310, P301+P312, P302+P352, P305+P351+P338, P312, P321, P322, P330, P337+P313, P361, P363, P405, P501 |
- Lethal dose or concentration (LD, LC)
| LD_{50} (median dose) | 15-78 mg/kg (oral, rat); 20-140 mg/kg (oral, mouse) |

Related compounds
| Related compounds | 4,4′-Bipyridine; Pyridine; Phenanthroline; 3-Pyridylnicotinamide; Terpyridine; Biphenyl |
- Except where otherwise noted, data are given for materials in their standard state (at 25 °C [77 °F], 100 kPa). verify (what is ?) Infobox references

2,2′-Bipyridine (bipy or bpy, pronounced /ˈbɪpiː/) is an organic compound with the formula (C_{5}H_{4}N)_{2}. This colorless solid is an important isomer of the bipyridine family. It is a bidentate chelating ligand, forming complexes with many transition metals. Ruthenium and platinum complexes of bipy exhibit intense luminescence.

== Preparation, structure, and general properties ==
2,2′-Bipyridine was first prepared by decarboxylation of divalent metal derivatives of pyridine-2-carboxylate:

2C_{5}H_{4}NCOO^{−} → (C_{5}H_{4}N)_{2} + 2CO_{2} + 2e^{−}

It is prepared by the dehydrogenation of pyridine using Raney nickel:

2C_{5}H_{5}N → (C_{5}H_{4}N)_{2} + H_{2}

=== Substituted 2,2′-bipyridines ===
Unsymmetrically substituted 2,2′-bipyridines can be prepared by cross coupling reaction of 2-pyridyl and substituted pyridyl reagents.

== Structure ==
Although bipyridine is often drawn with its nitrogen atoms in cis conformation, the lowest energy conformation both in solid state and in solution is in fact coplanar, with nitrogen atoms in trans position. Monoprotonated bipyridine adopts a cis conformation.

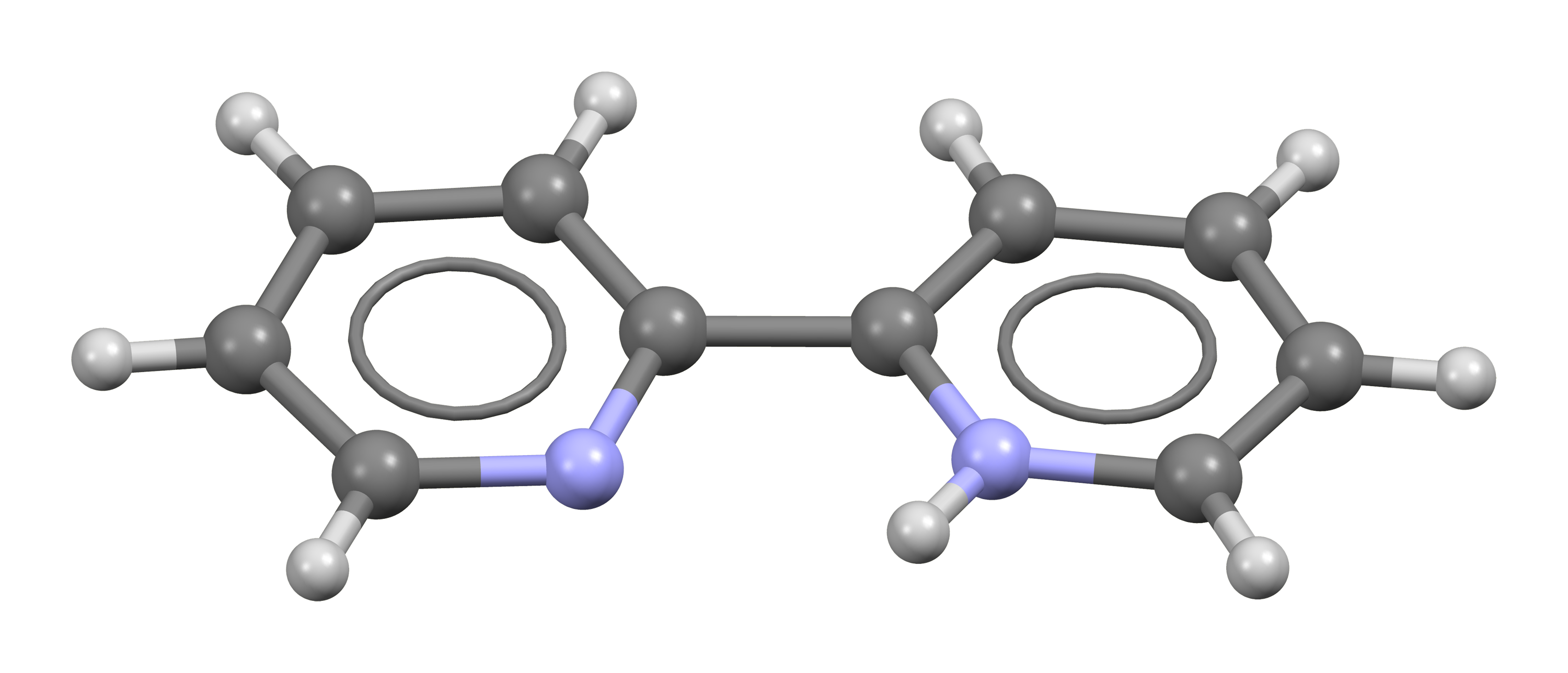

== Reactions ==
2,2′-Bipyridine produces multiple coordination complexes. It binds metals as a ligand for chelation, forming a 5-membered chelate ring.

== See also ==
- 2,2'-Biquinoline
- 1,10-Phenanthroline
- Dimethyl-2,2'-bipyridine
