= Viologen =

Redox-active bipyridinium derivative

Paraquat is a prominent viologen.

Viologens are a family of organic compounds with the formula (C_{5}H_{4}NR)_{2}^{n+}(X^{-})_{2}. They are N-alkyl derivatives of bipyridines. In some viologens, the pyridyl groups are further modified.

The viologen paraquat (R = methyl), is a widely used herbicide. As early as in the 1930s, paraquat was being used as an oxidation-reduction indicator, because it becomes violet on reduction.

Other viologens have been commercialized because they can change color reversibly many times through reduction and oxidation. The name viologen alludes to violet, one color it can exhibit, and the radical cation (C_{5}H_{4}NR)_{2}^{+} is colored intensely blue.

== Types of viologens ==
Paraquat is a derivative of 4,4'-bipyridine. The basic nitrogen centers in these compounds are alkylated to give viologens:

(C_{5}H_{4}N)_{2} + 2 RX → [(C_{5}H_{4}NR)_{2}]^{2+}(X^{−})_{2}

The alkylation is a form of quaternization. When the alkylating agent is a small alkyl halide, such as methyl chloride or methyl bromide, the viologen salt is often water-soluble. A wide variety of alkyl substituents have been investigated. Common derivatives are methyl (see paraquat), long chain alkyl, and benzyl.

== Redox properties ==
Viologens, in their dicationic form, typically undergo two one-electron reductions. The first reduction affords the deeply colored radical cation:

[V]^{2+} + e^{−} $\ce{<=>>}$ [V]^{+}

The radical cations are blue for 4,4'-viologens and green for 2,2'-derivatives. The second reduction yields a yellow quinoid compounds:

[V]^{+} + e^{−} $\ce{<=>>}$ [V]^{0}

The electron transfer is fast because the redox process induces little structural change. The redox is reversible. These reagents are relatively inexpensive among redox-active organic compounds. They are convenient colorimetric reagents for biochemical redox reactions.

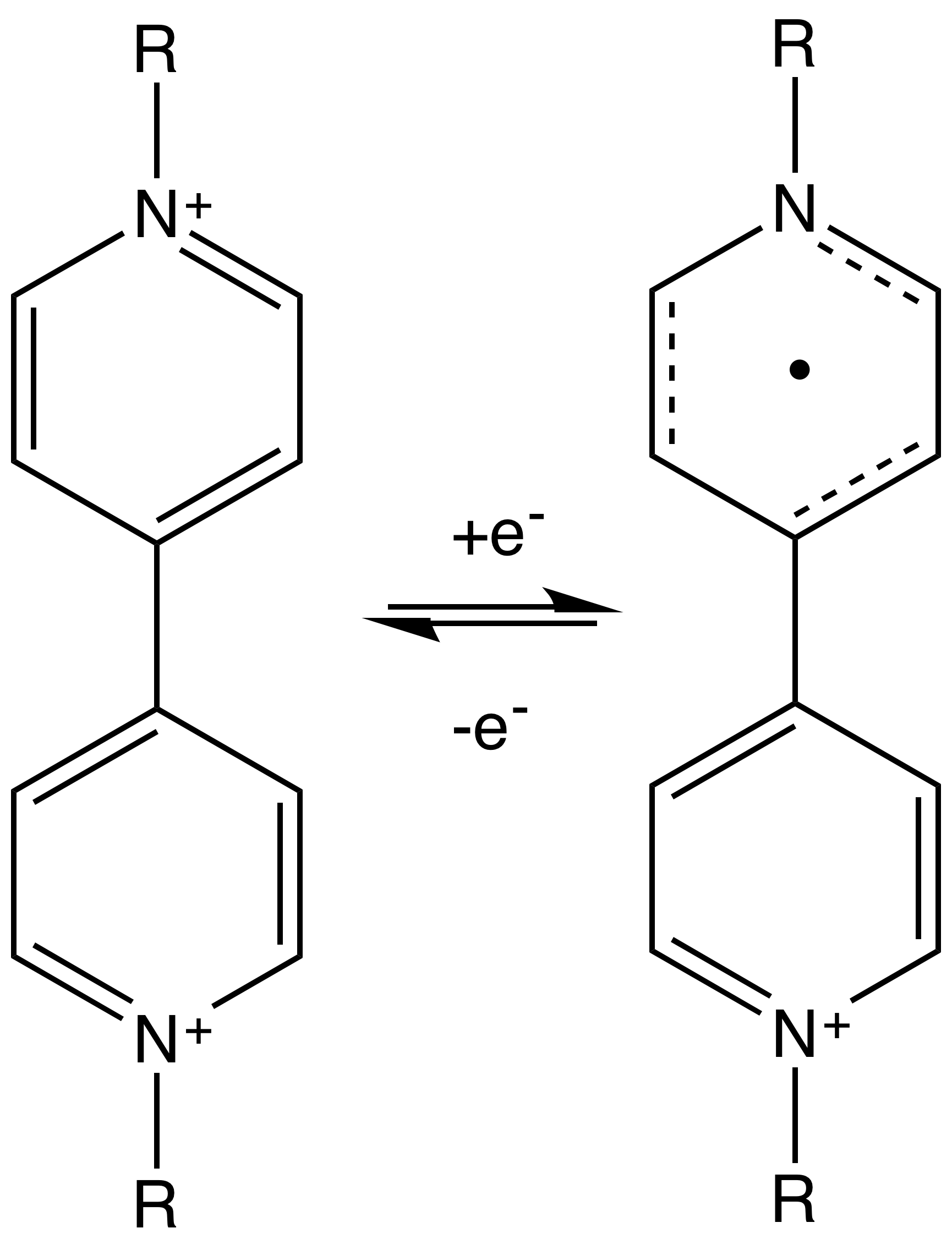
Redox couple for viologen. The 2+ species on the left is colorless, the 1+ species on the right is deep blue or red, depending on the identity of R.

== Research ==
Their tendency to form host–guest complexes is key to the molecular machines recognized by the 2016 Nobel Prize in Chemistry.

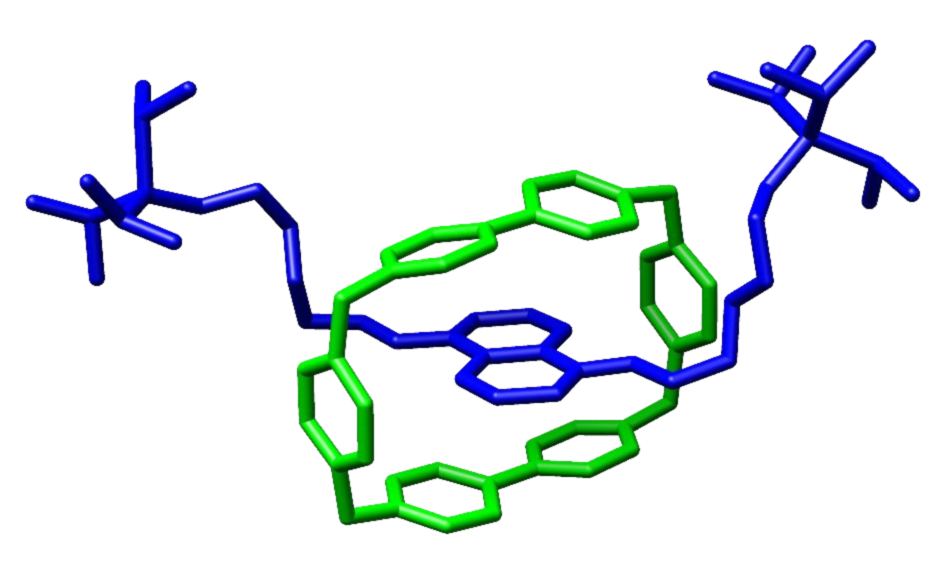
Structure of a rotaxane that has a cyclobis(paraquat-p-phenylene) (green), a macrocyclic bis(viologen.

Viologens are used in the negative electrolytes of some experimental flow batteries. Viologens have been modified to optimize their performance in such batteries, e.g. by incorporating them into redox-active polymers.

Viologen catalysts have been reported to oxidize glucose and other carbohydrates catalytically in a mildly alkaline solution, which makes direct carbohydrate fuel cells possible.

== Modified viologens and related compounds ==
Diquat is an isomer of viologens, being derived from 2,2'-bipyridine (instead of the 4,4'-isomer). It also is a potent herbicide that functions by disrupting electron-transfer.

Diquat is related to viologens but is derived from 2,2'bipyridine.

Extended viologens have been developed based on conjugated oligomers such as based on aryl, ethylene, and thiophene units are inserted between the pyridine units. The bipolaron di-octyl bis(4-pyridyl)biphenyl viologen 2 in scheme 2 can be reduced by sodium amalgam in DMF to the neutral viologen 3.

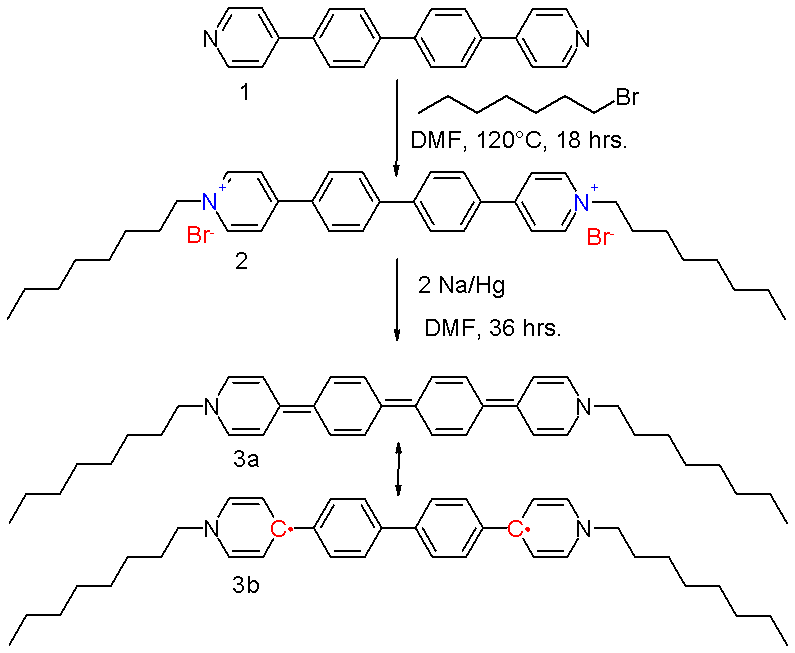
Scheme 2. Viologen reducing agent

The resonance structures of the quinoid 3a and the biradical 3b contribute equally to the hybrid structure. The driving force for the contributing 3b is the restoration of aromaticity with the biphenyl unit. It has been established using X-ray crystallography that the molecule is, in effect, coplanar with slight nitrogen pyramidalization, and that the central carbon bonds are longer (144 pm) than what would be expected for a double bond (136 pm). Further research shows that the diradical exists as a mixture of triplets and singlets, although an ESR signal is absent. In this sense, the molecule resembles Tschischibabin's hydrocarbon, discovered during 1907. It also shares with this molecule a blue color in solution, and a metallic-green color as crystals.

Compound 3 is a very strong reducing agent, with a redox potential of −1.48 V.

== Applications ==
The widely used herbicide paraquat is a viologen. This application is the largest consumer of this class of compounds. The toxicity of the 2,2'-, 4,4'-, or 2,4'-bipyridylium-based viologens is related to their ability to form stable free radicals. This redox activity allows these species to interfere with the electron transport chain in the plant.

Viologens have been commercialized as electrochromic systems because of their highly reversible and dramatic change of color upon reduction and oxidation. In some applications, N-heptyl viologens are used. Conducting solid supports such as titania and indium tin oxide have been used.
