= Tampering =

Tampering may refer to:

- Tampering (crime), intentional modification of products in a way that would make them harmful to the consumer
  - Tampering with evidence, a form of criminal falsification
  - Witness tampering, an illegal attempt to coerce witnesses called to testify in a legal proceeding
- Tampering (quality control), changing an industrial process in an attempt to improve output but having the opposite effect
- Tampering (sport), the practice, often illegal, of professional sports teams negotiating with athletes of other teams
- Tampering, in computer security, refers to data alteration
- Tampering, or sabotage, is modifying a device to induce failure

== See also ==
- Tamper (disambiguation)
