= Encaprin =

Brand of safety-coated aspirin capsules

Encaprin was a brand of safety-coated aspirin capsules made by Procter & Gamble in the mid-1980s through its Norwich Eaton Pharmaceuticals division. In 1986, the brand was involved in a cyanide poisoning hoax, and its sales never recovered.

== History ==
Procter & Gamble submitted a patent application on 14 March 1983 for its new line of over-the-counter micro-granulated aspirin capsules, to be sold under the name Encaprin, chosen for its phonetic similarity to the word aspirin. The product was first released in January 1984 to a lead market in Tucson, Arizona, and saw its national release in early May. A national television advertising campaign began on July 15, 1984, where it was marketed as a fast-acting analgesic, particularly for mild arthritis relief, while being easier on the stomach than traditional or buffered aspirin tablets, due to its distributed aspirin micro-granules.

The brand saw problems early on when a trademark infringement suit was filed by SmithKline Beckman, the makers of Ecotrin, a solid safety-coated aspirin tablet. The ruling sided with Procter & Gamble, and they were allowed to keep the Encaprin name. Success for Encaprin was short-lived, however, as the product faced intense competition from the acetaminophen-containing Tylenol and other aspirin products.

Encaprin's roll-out was further hampered by its timing. The product came onto the national market in May 1984, the same month ibuprofen was approved for over-the-counter sale. Advil, marketed by SKB, along with Bristol Myers's Nuprin, promptly came to market, benefiting from ibuprofen's successful ten-year track record. Advil quickly became a blockbuster perennial brand and genericized trademark itself for ibuprofen.

Despite heavy marketing, consumers saw no real benefit in Encaprin. Commodity drugs such as aspirin were (and are) available at lower cost for higher quantity in their original form, usually tablets. Encaprin was seen as merely a way to give aspirin an unjustified markup. P&G chose to focus more on the drug's coating being easier to stomach rather than the pure efficacy of pain relief their competitors emphasized. In addition to the competition from acetaminophen and ibuprofen, the regular and buffered aspirin brands of the time (including market leader Sterling Drug's Bayer Aspirin) then offered new higher-dose forms of aspirin which provided pain relief, lower stomach discomfort, and lower prices. Or competitors discounted their products to easily fend off P&G's challenge.

Encaprin was soon embroiled in the product tampering scares following the 1982 Chicago Tylenol murders. On March 27, 1986, an anonymous caller phoned P&G's toll-free customer support line, claiming he had placed cyanide in capsules of maximum strength Encaprin in Walgreens pharmacies in Chicago and Detroit, leading Walgreens, Kroger supermarkets and SupeRx drug stores to remove the product from all stores nationally.

Despite there not being any Walgreens stores in Metro Detroit in 1986 and the caller providing a non-existent lot number for the tampered medication, Norwich Eaton issued a recall and advisory cautions were announced. On April 5, 1986, Norwich Eaton and P&G announced that no evidence of tampering had been found, and Encaprin was returned to the shelves. Despite assurances Encaprin was never tampered with, the brand never recovered its sales, and P&G quietly retired it from sale in August 1986.

The Encaprin hoax influenced the 1989 FDA federal guidelines for the manufacture of tamper-proof products, which called for a minimum of two layers of tamper-proof packaging for two-piece capsule products, and the use of tamper-proof capsule sealing technologies.
