= James W. Lewis =

American extortionist (1946–2023)

- Lewis in 2021
- Born: August 8, 1946; Memphis, Tennessee, U.S.
- Died: July 9, 2023 (aged 76); Cambridge, Massachusetts, U.S.
- Occupations: Accountant, tax preparer
- Known for: Extortion in connection with Chicago Tylenol murders
- Criminal charge: Attempted extortion (1984)
- Spouse: LeAnn Lewis
- Children: 1 (deceased)

James William Lewis (August 8, 1946 – July 9, 2023) was an American extortionist best known for his role in the aftermath of the 1982 Chicago Tylenol poisonings. He was convicted of extortion in connection with a letter sent to Johnson & Johnson, but was never charged with the poisonings themselves.

In October 1982, following a series of cyanide-laced Tylenol capsules that killed seven people in the Chicago area, Lewis sent a handwritten letter to Johnson & Johnson demanding $1 million to stop the killing. The letter included details that had not been made public, drawing the attention of investigators. After an extensive manhunt, Lewis and his wife, LeAnn Lewis, were located in New York City, where he was arrested and charged with extortion. On June 14, he was convicted and sentenced to 10 years in prison. He served around 12 years, including time spent in pre-trial detention, before his release in October 1995.

Though Lewis was considered a prime suspect in the Tylenol case, authorities never charged him with the actual poisonings, citing insufficient evidence. Over the years, Lewis maintained his innocence regarding the deaths, claiming he had written the letter to draw attention to Johnson & Johnson's vulnerability. He continued to be the subject of law enforcement interest until his death in 2023.

== Personal life ==
James W. Lewis was born to Theodore and Opal Wilson on August 8, 1946, in Memphis, Tennessee. Lewis and his two sisters were left at a motel by their mother after their father abandoned the family. The children were recovered by social workers a few days later. Lewis was adopted by Charlotte and Floyd William Lewis, a churchgoing farming couple who renamed him James William Lewis. He grew up with his adoptive parents in Carl Junction, Missouri. According to a CBS 2 news report, Lewis was considered problematic during adolescence; at one point in 1966, he attacked his adoptive mother with an axe and was voluntarily committed to a state mental institution. He left the institution in 1968, then moved to Kansas City, Missouri, where he later worked as a tax preparer.

James W. Lewis was married to LeAnn Lewis (sometimes spelled Leanne), whom he met while working in Kansas City. The couple had one daughter, Toni Ann Lewis, born in 1969. Toni was diagnosed with Down syndrome and died in 1974 at the age of five due to complications from a congenital heart defect.

Following her death, Lewis claimed that the heart sutures used in his daughter's surgery were manufactured by a Johnson & Johnson subsidiary and blamed the company for her failed operation. In later interviews, he cited grief over Toni's death as a motive for writing the 1982 extortion letter to Johnson & Johnson. He characterized the letter as an emotional outburst rather than a genuine threat and later claimed it was part of a broader attempt to embarrass his wife's former employer. However, in episode 3 of the 2025 Netflix docuseries Cold Case: The Tylenol Murders, Lewis contradicted earlier implications of personal resentment. In an interview featured in the series, he stated that he was not angry with Johnson & Johnson and added that his daughter died from natural causes. Despite his conviction for extortion and a possible motive, Lewis consistently denied involvement in the poisonings until his death.

After his release from prison in 1995, Lewis and his wife settled in Cambridge, Massachusetts, where they operated a small tax and accounting business. They remained married until he died in 2023.

Lewis died on July 9, 2023, at the age of 76, in his home in Cambridge, Massachusetts. Emergency services responded after his wife, LeAnn, found him unresponsive. According to the Massachusetts Office of the Chief Medical Examiner, the cause of death was determined to be a combination of heart and liver disease, and no foul play was suspected. His death occurred shortly before the release of a Netflix docuseries revisiting the Tylenol murders, in which he appeared in previously recorded interviews for the last time.

== Involvement in the Tylenol murders and extortion conviction ==
In late September and early October 1982, seven people in the Chicago area died after ingesting Tylenol capsules that had been laced with potassium cyanide. The case, widely known as the Chicago Tylenol murders, prompted a national panic and led to major reforms in over-the-counter medication packaging and federal anti-tampering laws. The actual perpetrator of the poisonings was never identified, and the case remains officially unsolved.

James W. Lewis became connected to the investigation after a typed extortion letter was sent to Johnson & Johnson, the parent company of Tylenol's manufacturer, demanding $1 million to "stop the killing." The letter was postmarked from Chicago and contained details about the poisonings that had not yet been made public. It was signed “Robert Richardson.” The full text of the letter is reproduced below as it appeared in court documents:

"Gentlemen: As you can see, it is easy to place cyanide, both potassium and sodium, into capsules sitting on store shelves. And since the cyanide is inside the gelatin, it is easy to get buyers to swallow the bitter pill. Another beauty is that cyanide operates quickly. It takes so very little. And there will be no time to take countermeasures. If you don't mind the publicity of these little capsules, then do nothing. So far I have spent less than $50 and it takes me less than 10 minutes per bottle. If you want to stop the killing, then wire $1 million to bank account number 8449597 at Continental Illinois Bank, Chicago, Illinois. Don't attempt to involve the FBI or local Chicago authorities with this letter. A couple of phone calls by me will undo anything you can possibly do."

Following a nationwide manhunt, the FBI arrested James W. Lewis on December 13, 1982, at the New York Public Library, after identifying him as the author of the Tylenol extortion letter. At the time, Lewis and his wife, LeAnn, were living in New York City under aliases after fleeing Chicago. Investigators later linked Lewis to the extortion attempt through handwriting and fingerprint analysis, and traced the bank account referenced in the letter where the ransom money was to be deposited to a fictitious account under the name of Lakeside Travel, a former employer of Lewis's wife.

Lewis later admitted to writing the extortion letter but denied any involvement in the actual poisonings. He claimed the letter was an attempt to embarrass his wife's former employer, not a genuine threat, and at various times characterized the act as either a satirical protest, a frame-up, or an emotional outburst. He was never charged with murder or product tampering.

In June 1984, Lewis was convicted of attempted extortion under the federal Hobbs Act. He was sentenced to 10 years in prison, though he ultimately served nearly 12 years—including pretrial detention from his December 1982 arrest—before his release in October 1995. Despite maintaining his innocence, Lewis remained the prime suspect in the Tylenol case for decades.

In 2009, nearly three decades after the original Tylenol murders, the FBI reopened the case using modern forensic techniques. Investigators renewed their focus on James W. Lewis, who remained the primary suspect despite never being charged with the actual poisonings. In February 2009, federal agents executed a search warrant at Lewis's home in Cambridge, Massachusetts, seizing computers, handwritten notes, and other potential evidence. Authorities stated they were looking for materials that might link Lewis directly to the tampered Tylenol bottles. Around the same time, Lewis voluntarily provided fingerprints and DNA samples to federal investigators. However, despite the renewed forensic interest, no definitive physical evidence was found tying him to the cyanide-laced capsules, and he was not charged. The case remains officially unsolved.

In the 2025 Netflix docuseries Cold Case: The Tylenol Murders, Lewis again denied any involvement in the deaths. He stated, “I wouldn’t hurt anybody,” and claimed he had no personal animosity toward Johnson & Johnson, contradicting earlier statements in which he blamed the company for his daughter's death following a failed heart surgery involving allegedly defective sutures.

== Other legal issues ==
In addition to his 1982 extortion conviction, James W. Lewis was involved in several other legal incidents over the course of his life.

In 1978, Lewis was charged with the murder and dismemberment of Raymond West, a 72-year-old tax client, in Kansas City, Missouri. West's remains were discovered in multiple plastic bags in his attic, so decomposed that it could not be immediately identified. Authorities believed the killing was financially motivated, as Lewis had done West's taxes shortly before his disappearance. Despite this, the case was dropped before trial due to insufficient forensic evidence and legal technicalities regarding the admissibility of key materials found in Lewis's home.

In 1981, Lewis pleaded guilty to six counts of mail fraud after he used the identity of a deceased tax client to fraudulently obtain 13 credit cards, which he used to accumulate over $11,000 in purchases. He was sentenced to probation, but soon came under further investigation.

Shortly after his arrest in the Tylenol case in late 1982, Lewis sent a letter to President Ronald Reagan, in which he threatened to use radio-controlled model airplanes to interfere with Secret Service operations around the White House. Federal prosecutors filed additional charges under the Hobbs Act, including unlawful flight and attempted extortion. However, it is unclear whether this case proceeded to trial or resulted in conviction, and it is not listed among his known sentencing records.

In 2004, Lewis was arrested in Cambridge, Massachusetts, and charged with multiple felonies, including rape, kidnapping, assault, and administering drugs with intent to commit a crime. The alleged victim, a woman in her twenties who lived in the same apartment building, claimed Lewis had lured her into his home and assaulted her with a chemical. He was held without bail and remained in custody for nearly three years. In 2007, the case was dismissed after the woman declined to testify in court, leaving prosecutors without sufficient evidence to proceed. Authorities offered no official explanation for her withdrawal from the case, and Lewis was released shortly thereafter.

== Media coverage and public image ==
Lewis has remained a central figure in media discussions of the Tylenol murders, despite never being charged with the actual poisonings. He was featured in the 2025 Netflix docuseries Cold Case: The Tylenol Murders, in which he reiterated his innocence. Media portrayals often depicted him as eccentric, combative, and intelligent, but also evasive and manipulative.

== Legacy and impact ==
Though never convicted in connection with the Tylenol poisonings, Lewis's extortion case played a role in shaping public discourse on product safety and corporate response to tampering. The case prompted the U.S. Congress to pass the Federal Anti-Tampering Act in 1983 and led to widespread adoption of tamper-evident packaging in the pharmaceutical industry.

== See also ==
- Chicago Tylenol murders
- Product tampering
