= Safe deposit box =

Secure container for storage of valuables – usually in a bank

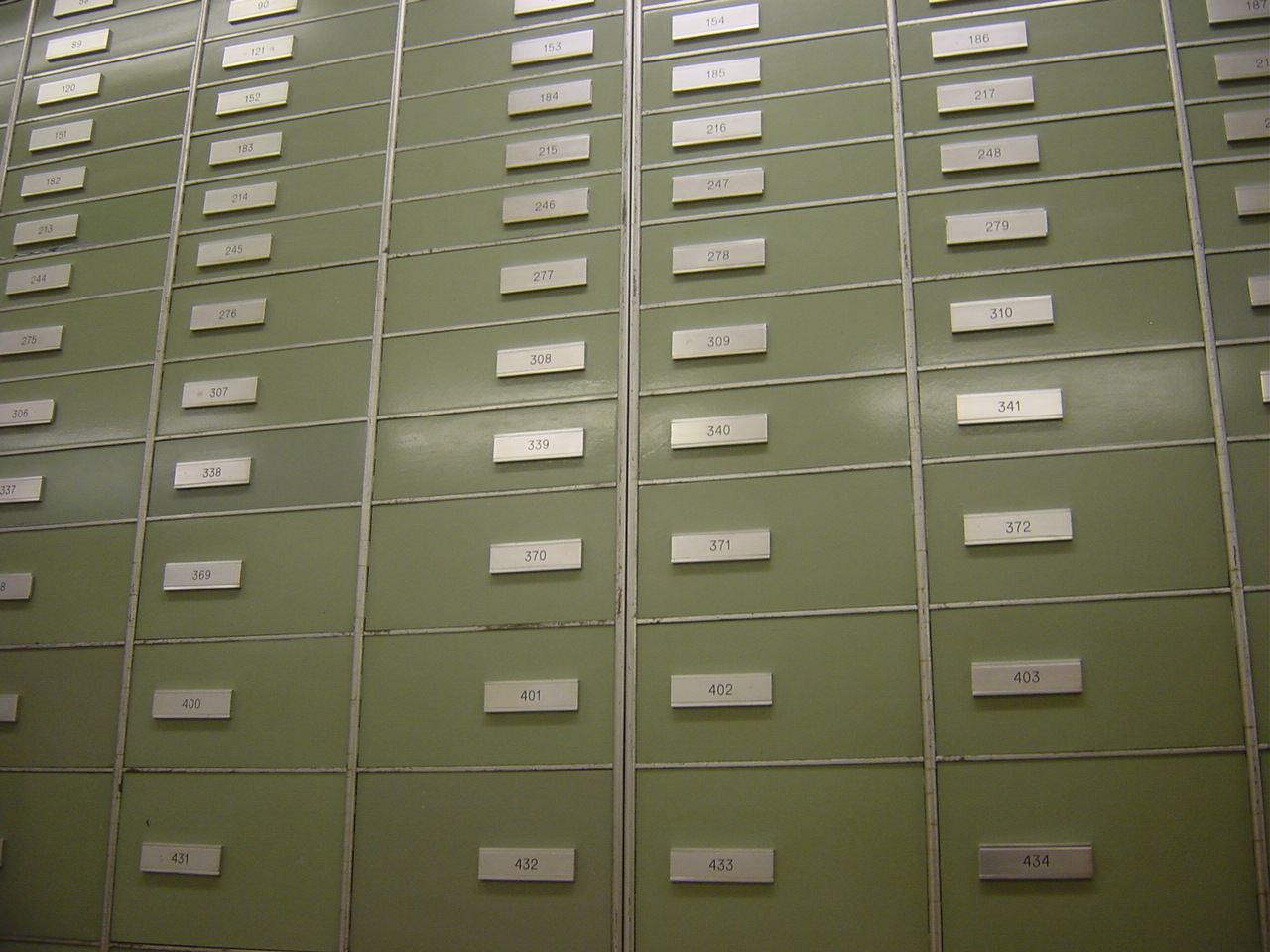
Safe deposit boxes inside a Swiss bank.

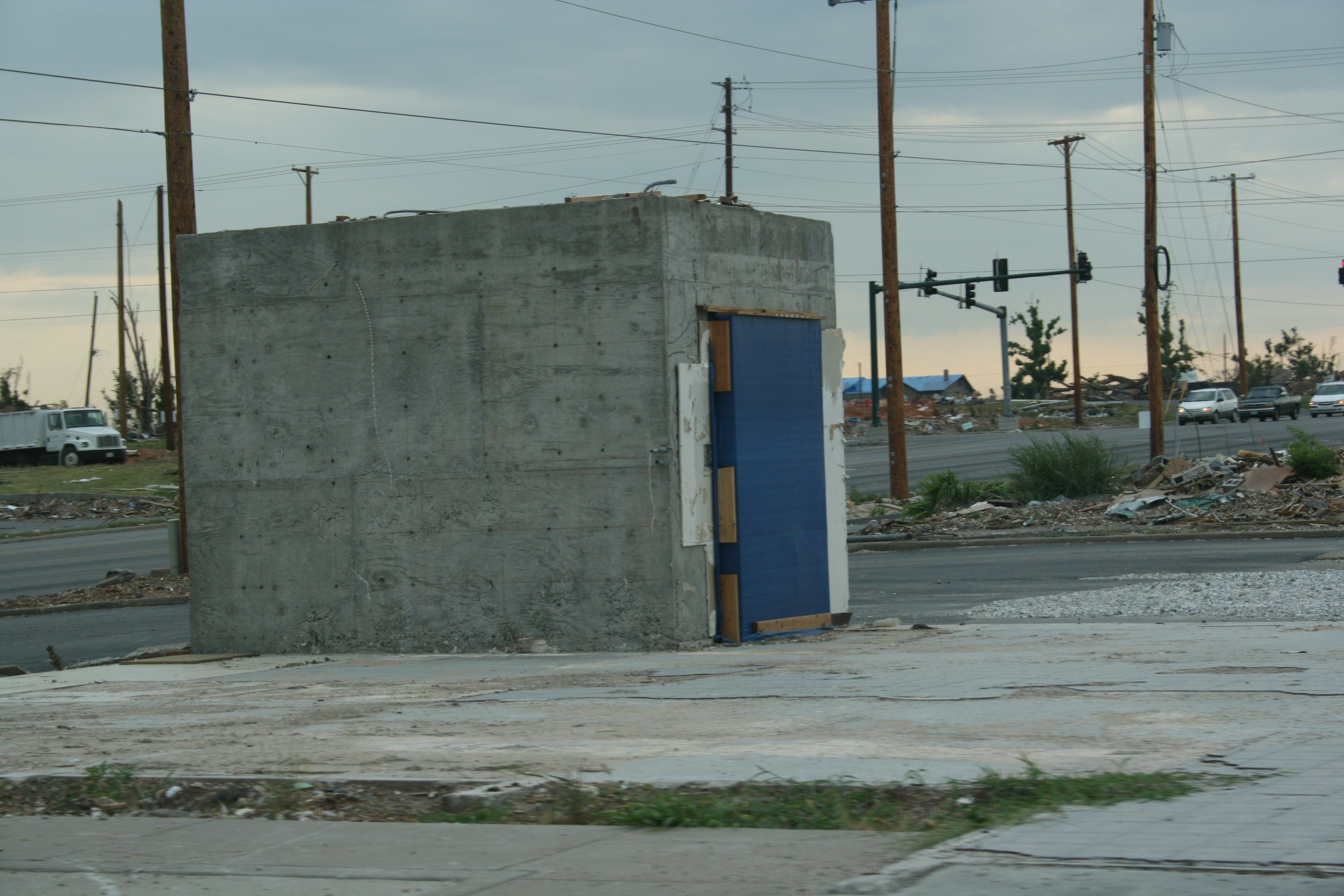
Safe deposit vault in Joplin, Missouri after the 2011 Joplin tornado, remaining intact despite the destruction of the bank that housed it.

A safe deposit box, sometimes referred to as a safety deposit box, is an individually secured container, usually held within a larger safe or bank vault. Safe deposit boxes are generally located in banks, post offices, or other institutions.

== Usage ==
Safe deposit boxes are used to store valuable possessions, such as gemstones, precious metals, currency, marketable securities, luxury goods, important documents (e.g., wills, property deeds, or birth certificates), or computer data, which need protection from theft, fire, flood, tampering, or other perils. In the United States, neither banks nor the FDIC insure the contents. An individual can purchase separate insurance for the safe deposit box in order to cover unexpected events (e.g., theft, fire, flooding, or terrorist attacks).

Some hotels, resorts, and cruise ships offer safe deposit boxes or small safes to their patrons, for temporary use during their stay. These facilities can be either located behind the reception desk or else securely anchored within private guest rooms for additional privacy.

The contents of safe deposit boxes may be seized under the legal theory of abandoned property. They also may be searched and seized by the order of a court through the issuance of a search warrant.

=== Decline ===
In the United States and elsewhere, safe deposit boxes are considered a "legacy service"; many new bank branches do not bother to install any. In the 20th century, bank branches were more prestigious, but in the 21st century, space has grown more valuable with higher land values and rents, and many banks see a safe deposit box service as unnecessary relative to their core business offerings.

In addition, despite the public perception of safe deposit boxes as being extremely secure, banks have little incentive to actually ensure this is true in practice. For example, the United States has no laws or regulations at the federal level that govern the matter or that would require compensation to customers in the event that customer property stored in a safe deposit box were stolen or destroyed.

== See also ==
- Banking in Switzerland
- Numbered bank account

== Bibliography ==
- Barrow, Christopher (1 March 2016). "The History of the Safe Deposit Box". Metropolitan Safe Custody.
- Waters, Michael (3 December 2022). "The quiet disappearance of the safe deposit box". The Hustle. HubSpot Media.
