= Paraquat murders =

1985 series of beverage poisonings in Japan

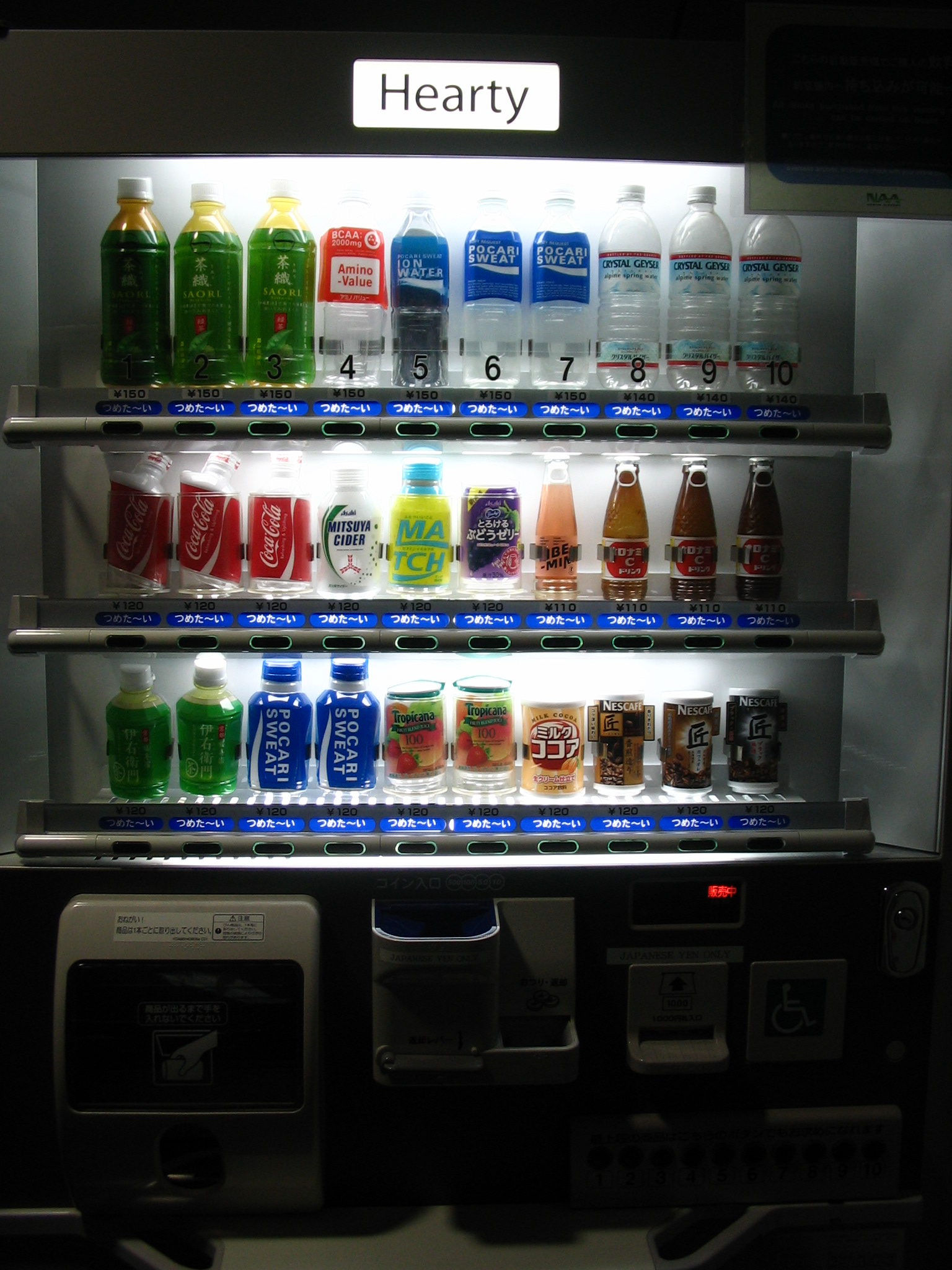
- A Japanese vending machine containing (among other drinks) bottles of Oronamin C, which was intentionally poisoned by the culprit or culprits
- Location: Japan
- Date: April 30 – November 24, 1985
- Attack type: Poisoning (using paraquat and diquat)
- Deaths: 13 killed
- Injuries: 35 poisoned
- Perpetrator: Unknown

The paraquat murders (パラコート連続毒殺事件, Parakōto renzoku dokusatsu jiken) were a series of indiscriminate beverage poisonings carried out in western and central Japan in 1985. The drinks were placed in and around vending machines, where the victim would consume the beverage. All the beverages were poisoned with the herbicide paraquat dichloride, except for one which was poisoned with diquat. The most targeted beverages were the energy drinks Oronamin C and Real Gold. The first known case was on April 30, in Fukuyama. At least 13 people died and 35 became seriously ill, in what is possibly the deadliest product-tampering case in history. Warning labels and leaflets were posted around Tokyo, and on many of the 5.2 million vending machines across Japan. Police were unable to gather any evidence about the murders, and the case remains unsolved.

== Events ==
The first victim was poisoned on April 30, 1985. The victim drank a bottle of Oronamin C, a vitamin energy drink, that was left on top of a vending machine in Fukuyama, Hiroshima Prefecture. He fell ill and died on May 30.

The bottle had been laced with paraquat dichloride, a herbicide used to control weeds. Paraquat is a highly toxic chemical to humans that can destroy the body in a matter of days or hours. At the time, the chemical was widely available in Japan, because it could be purchased without a prescription or identification. Those who bought paraquat had to prove they needed it for agricultural purposes. Paraquat was used by 1,402 people to commit suicide in Japan in 1984.

At the time of the murders, Ohtsuka Pharmaceutical, the company which made Oronamin C, had a buy one, get one free promotion of the drink to combat low sales among young people. The drink was especially popular among middle-aged men in Japan. Taking advantage of the promotion, the criminal laced Oronamin C bottles with paraquat and placed them in and around public vending machines, to make customers think they got the promotion. The poisonings primarily occurred in western and central Japan, and in Tokyo. Oronamin C and another energy drink, Real Gold, were the primary drinks targeted, though some also died from drinking Coca-Cola. One of the poisonings used diquat instead of paraquat.

On September 5, 44-year old executive Takashi Sakai drank two vitamin drinks, which he died from six weeks later. On September 11, 52-year old Haruo Otsu drank from a free bottle of Oranamin C in Tokyo: he died 52 hours later. On September 25, a man in Wakayama Prefecture was hospitalized after falling ill, and on September 26 a 40-year-old woman in Shizuoka Prefecture fell ill. Either Takashi Sakai or a 17-year-old girl from Saitama was the last victim of the murders.

=== Response ===
While the police had no leads, it was believed that the crimes were organized and executed by a single person. The police also noted how the crimes had no targeted or consistent victims, making it impossible to establish a motive. The culprit was never caught on security cameras, and left no physical evidence. Two of the manufacturers of the most targeted soft drinks, Ohtsuka Pharmaceutical and Coca-Cola Japan, said they had not received any threats or extortion attempts.

On September 27, the National Police Agency declared preparations for a nationwide campaign to prevent further poisonings, which included leaflets distributed throughout Tokyo. They warned customers to inspect vending machine slots, suspicious containers and tampered beverage caps, warned vending machine operators to check their merchandise and urged stores selling poisonous substances to "clamp down" on the substances' illegal buyers and keep accurate records. Japanese Soft Drink Bottlers Association spokesman Takeo Mizuuchi shifted blame onto victims, expressing how customers should notice broken seals and stating that "if only consumers were more cautious, they would have seen that some tampering had been done." Despite his statement, Mizuuchi issued 1.3 million warning stickers to be placed on vending machines across the capital. Warnings were posted on many of Japan's 5.2 million vending machines by both vending machine operators and drink companies. Customers were advised to throw away any free drinks they got from the machines. The National Soft Drink Manufacturers' Association placed warnings as advertisements in major newspapers. Vending machine manufacturers also planned to install lamps on dispensers that would light up if the slots were tampered with.

The Chicago Tribune reported that experts in various fields at the time of the murders speculated them to be a manifestation of Japan's orderly, intense and work-oriented society. Hiroaki Iwao, a Tokyo professor of criminal sociology, said, "It is not uncommon for Japanese who live under tremendous pressure, both on the job and in overcrowded communities, to let out their frustrations by hurting someone else," insinuating that the crimes were an outlet of relief for the criminal. Additionally, Susumu Oda, a mental health specialist at the University of Tsukuba, suggested the crimes to be motivated by adrenaline rushes and a sense of superiority in imagining victims struggling.

=== Aftermath ===
By December 8, the spree killed at least ten people and made 35 seriously ill. In 2012, CBC News reported the death toll may have been as high as twelve, which would make it possibly the deadliest product-tampering case in history. It was also theorized a number of the deaths were from copycat killers or people attempting to poison themselves in a method imitating the murders. The case had no DNA evidence and the culprit was never caught, although if apprehended, they could still be held legally liable, as Japan abolished the statute of limitations for murder in 2010.

In 1986, adjustments were made to paraquat and diquat to make it less toxic, though by 2002 it still accounted for 40% of pesticide poisoning deaths.

A potential copycat crime happened in December 1985: in Mie Prefecture, containers of milk served in schools were tainted. In 1998, Japan had another wave of drink poisonings in vending machines, as well as convenience stores. There was also a case of a paraquat poisoning in 2019 in Akita Prefecture.

== See also ==
- Chicago Tylenol murders
- The Monster with 21 Faces
