= CommCore Consulting Group =

American public relations firm

- Type: Private
- Industry: Public relations and crisis communications
- Founded: 1985
- Founder: Andrew Gilman
- Headquarters: Washington, D.C.
- Number of locations: 4
- Areas served: Worldwide
- Key people: Andy Gilman (Founder and CEO); Jerry Doyle (Principal) Dale Weiss (Senior Vice President); Nick Peters (Senior Vice President) Amy Doman (Vice President of Administration)
- Website: commcoreconsulting.com

CommCore Consulting Group is a specialty public relations firm concentrating on media training, messaging, crisis planning and response. CommCore has offices in Washington, DC, New York, Dallas, and Los Angeles.

== Corporate history ==
CommCore Consulting was founded in New York in 1985 by Andrew Gilman. The firm subsequently opened offices in Washington, DC, in 1991, Los Angeles in 1998, and Dallas in 2012.

== Notable work ==
During the Johnson & Johnson's Tylenol 1 crisis in 1982, CommCore founder Andrew Gilman counseled the company on messages and interview preparation. Gilman specifically worked with Chairman James Burke to prepare for the critical 60 Minutes interview as part of the product comeback.

CommCore provided counsel to Lockheed Martin executives after the Space Shuttle Challenger and Columbia crashes in 1986 and 2003. CommCore's consultants prepared executives for interviews and Congressional testimony.

CommCore has prepared CEOs and other executives for interviews on all major media outlets including 60 Minutes, the Today Show, editorial boards at The New York Times and The Washington Post.

In 2017, The New York Times ran a story on CommCore's crisis simulation, PressureTest.
