= Tamper =

Tamper may refer to:

- Tamper (tool) is a tool used for material compaction
- Tamper, a pipe tool component
- Tamper (nuclear weapons), a layer of dense material surrounding the fissile material
- Tamper, to interfere with, falsify, or sabotage
- Ballast tamper, a machine that tamps railroad track ballast

== See also ==
- Tampere
- The Tamperer featuring Maya
- Tampering (disambiguation)
