= Cyclobis(paraquat-p-phenylene) =

Identifiers
CAS Number	117271-76-8 (Tetracation); 117271-78-0 (Tetrachloride)
3D model (JSmol)	Interactive image
ChemSpider	3655997
PubChem CID	4457151
CompTox Dashboard (EPA)	DTXSID101032304
- InChI: InChI=1S/C36H32N4/c1-2-30-4-3-29(1)25-37-17-9-33(10-18-37)35-13-21-39(22-14-35)27-31-5-7-32(8-6-31)28-40-23-15-36(16-24-40)34-11-19-38(26-30)20-12-34/h1-24H,25-28H2/q+4 Key: URORLZXVTFVIPS-UHFFFAOYSA-N; InChI=1/C36H32N4/c1-2-30-4-3-29(1)25-37-17-9-33(10-18-37)35-13-21-39(22-14-35)27-31-5-7-32(8-6-31)28-40-23-15-36(16-24-40)34-11-19-38(26-30)20-12-34/h1-24H,25-28H2/q+4 Key: URORLZXVTFVIPS-UHFFFAOYAV
- SMILES: c1cc2ccc1C[n+]3ccc(cc3)-c4cc[n+](cc4)Cc5ccc(cc5)C[n+]6ccc(cc6)-c7cc[n+](cc7)C2

Properties
Chemical formula	C_{36}H_{32}N_{4}
Molar mass	520.663 g·mol^{−1}
Appearance	white solid
- Except where otherwise noted, data are given for materials in their standard state (at 25 °C [77 °F], 100 kPa). Infobox references

Cyclobis(paraquat-p-phenylene) (formally a derivative of paraquat) is a molecule that belongs to the class of cyclophanes, and consists of aromatic units connected by methylene bridges. It is able to incorporate small guest molecules, and has as such plays an important role in host–guest chemistry and supramolecular chemistry.

The cyclophane is also referred to as Stoddart's blue box because its inventor, J. Fraser Stoddart, illustrates the electron-poor areas of molecules in a blue shade.

== Synthesis ==
For synthesis of cyclobis(paraquat-p-phenylene), 4,4'-bipyridine is reacted with 1,4-bis(bromomethyl)benzene to 1,1′-[1,4-phenylenebis-(methylene)]bis(4,4′-bipyridine), which is reacted in a template synthesis again with 4,4′-bipyridine to the final product. A common template for this synthesis is 1,5-bis[2-(2-methoxyethoxy)ethoxy]naphthalene.

== Host guest chemistry ==
Cyclobis(paraquat-p-phenylene) is able to incorporate small guest molecules forming a host–guest complex. The interactions required for complex formation are donor-acceptor interactions and hydrogen bonding, their strength is highly dependent on the ability of the donor to provide π-electron density. Also an enlargement of the π-system enhances the binding. The kinetics of complex formation and dissociation depends on the bulkiness of the guest.

One molecule which is able to form stable complexes with cyclobis(paraquat-p-phenylene) is tetrathiafulvalene (TTF). Numerous derivatives are based on the chelating ability of tetrathiafulvalene. The modifications include mechanically entrapped compounds such as catenanes and rotaxanes, molecular switches and larger supramolecular structures.

The charge-transfer interactions, present in complexes of cyclobis(paraquat-p-phenylene), can be compared as structural motif with the more commonly used hydrogen bonds, especially in terms of directionality and complementarity (lock-and-key model). Charge-transfer complexes are easier to detect by spectroscopic methods and have a greater tolerance to various solvents, but also generally a lower association constant. Due to the lower association constant many fewer charge transfer complexes are known. Other non-covalent bonds such as solvophobic forces, metal-ligand interaction can be used to increase the association constant; numerous structures based on this strategy are known in literature.

It was shown that the choice of the counterion of cyclobis(paraquat-p-phenylene) has a large influence on the association constant of the corresponding host–guest complex. It is often used as hexafluorophosphate salt because in this form it is soluble in organic solvents.

== Utilization ==
To create catenanes, the cyclobis(paraquat-p-phenylene) can be used as a template to "thread" a crown ether with a π-donor component. Subsequently, its still open ends are linked with each other to obtain two closed rings. A bistable catenane (a ring with two π-donor components) is already a simple example of a molecular switch. In the present example, a cyclic ether has been selected with a TTF and a DNP moiety. While the cyclobis(paraquat-p-phenylene) surroundings the TTF unit in the rest position, the DNP unit is stable when the TTF is (reversible) is oxidized. The ring rotates in this case due to the coulomb repulsion around itself until the cyclobis(paraquat-p-phenylene) encloses the DNP unit. A reverse movement occurs when the TTF unit is reduced again. This first example that proved the general feasibility, many more have followed.

== Derivates ==
Numerous derivatives of cyclobis(paraquat-p-phenylene) have been developed, including an enlarged version of the molecule, in the literature referred Ex^{n}Box^{4+}, where n is the number of p-phenylene rings (n = 0-3). These variants with larger apertures are capable to included larger, different sized molecules. Based on the charge-transfer complexation of CBPQT4 + many supramolecular structures have been created, including fibrillar gels, micelles, vesicles, nanotubes, foldamers and liquid crystalline phases. In analogy to biological systems, which are assembled by hydrogen bonds to form supramolecular structures, the charge-transfer complexation is here an alternative.
