= Bipyridine =

Group of chemical compounds

Bipyridines are a family of organic compounds with the formula (C_{5}H_{4}N)_{2}, consisting of two pyridyl (C_{5}H_{4}N) rings. Pyridine is an aromatic nitrogen-containing heterocycle. The bipyridines are all colourless solids, which are soluble in organic solvents and slightly soluble in water. Bipyridines, especially the 4,4' isomer, are mainly of significance in pesticides.

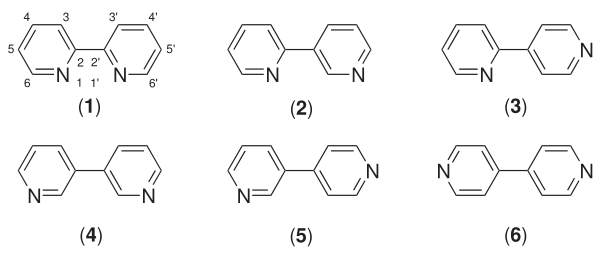
The six possible regioisomers of bipyridine: (1) 2,2′-bipyridine; (2) 2,3′-bipyridine; (3) 2,4′-bipyridine; (4) 3,3′-bipyridine; (5) 3,4′-bipyridine; (6) 4,4′-bipyridine

Six isomers of bipyridine exist, but two are prominent. 2,2′-bipyridine, also known as bipyridyl, dipyridyl, and dipyridine, is a popular ligand in coordination chemistry

== 2,2′-Bipyridine ==
2,2′-Bipyridine (2,2′-bipy) is a chelating ligand that forms complexes with most transition metal ions that are of broad academic interest. Many of these complexes have distinctive optical properties, and some are of interest for analysis. Its complexes are used in studies of electron and energy transfer, supramolecular, and materials chemistry, and catalysis.

2,2′-Bipyridine is used in the manufacture of diquat.

== 4,4′-Bipyridine ==
4,4′-Bipyridine (4,4′-bipy) is mainly used as a precursor to the N,N′-dimethyl-4,4′-bipyridinium dication commonly known as paraquat. This species is redox active, and its toxicity arises from its ability to interrupt biological electron transfer processes. Because of its structure, 4,4′-bipyridine can bridge between metal centres to give coordination polymers.

== 3,4′-Bipyridine ==
The 3,4′-bipyridine derivatives inamrinone and milrinone are used occasionally for short term treatment of congestive heart failure. They inhibit phosphodiesterase and thus increasing cAMP, exerting positive inotropy and causing vasodilation. Inamrinone causes thrombocytopenia. Milrinone decreases survival in heart failure.
