= Oronamin C =

Japanese carbonated beverage

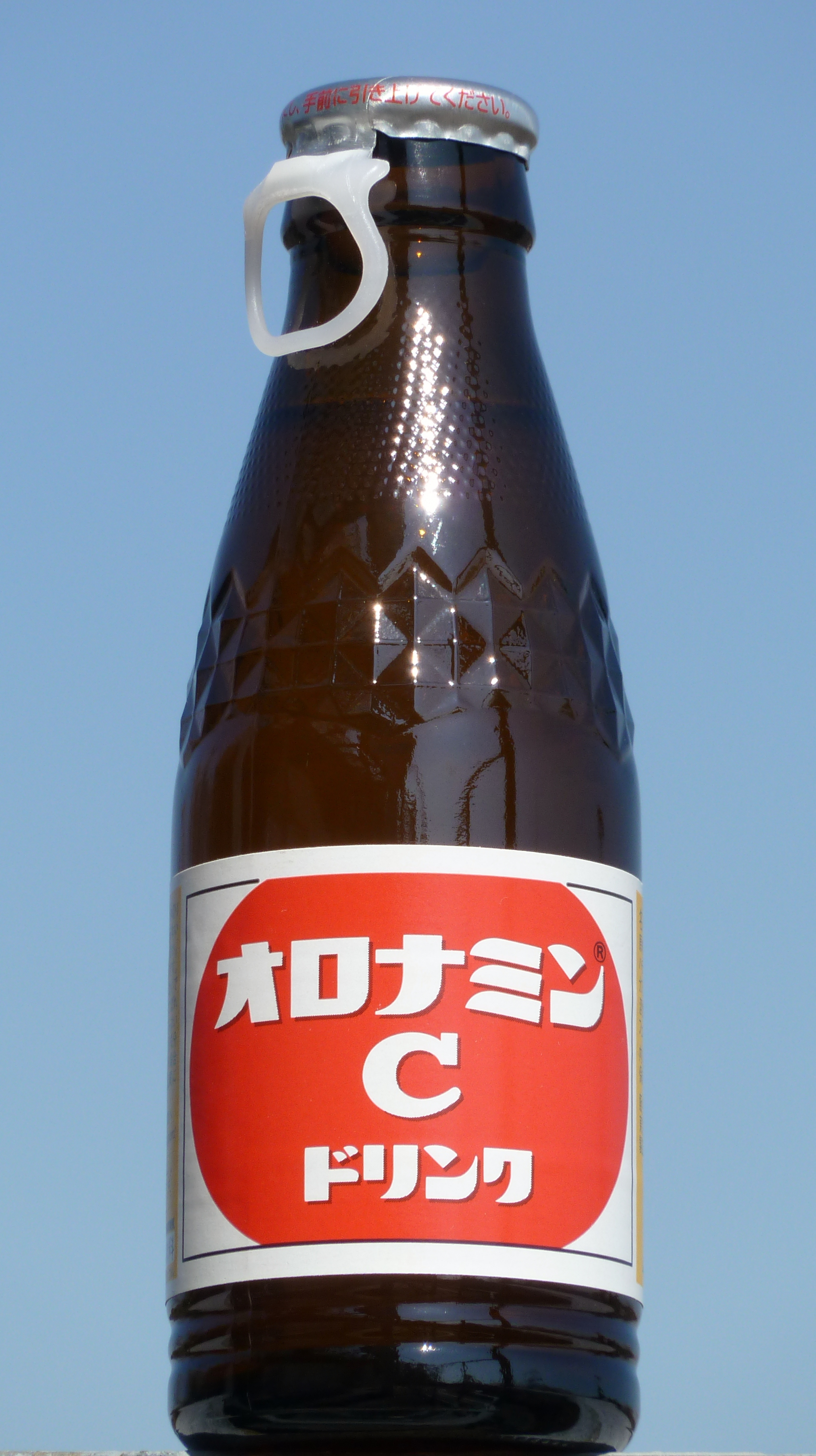
A bottle of Oronamin C

Oronamin C Drink (オロナミンCドリンク, Oronamin Shī Dorinku), produced by Otsuka Chemical Holdings Co., Ltd., (distributed and sold by Otsuka Pharmaceutical Co.) is a carbonated beverage available in Japan. It is commonly called Oronamin C or Oronamin. Its name is similar to the Takeda Pharmaceutical Co. product "Arinamin" and its name comes from Otsuka's own Oronine H Ointment and one of its ingredients, vitamin C. Oronamin C was named after the Oronine H Ointment in hopes that it would prove to be equally successful.

== Product summary ==
Oronamin C was introduced in February 1965 and was initially sold in a 120 ml glass bottle sealed with a bottle cap. It contains isoleucine and many other essential amino acids as well as many vitamins such as vitamin B_{2}, vitamin B_{6} and vitamin C. It is not only available in supermarkets and convenience stores in Japan, but also in Otsuka Pharmaceutical Co. vending machines as well. The bottle cap was briefly replaced with a screw bottle cap, but following a nationwide scare during the 1980s regarding a large number of poisoned sealed bottled beverages known as the Paraquat murders, this screw cap was replaced with a one-time "pull-cap," which cannot be re-sealed after opening. Child welfare activist Osamu Mizutani wrote that the previous screw caps allowed individuals to put in paint thinner and then re-seal the bottles.

In 2000, a "sister" product Oronamin C Royal Polis (オロナミンC ロイヤルポリス, Oronamin Shī Roiyaru Porisu) was introduced. It contains royal jelly and propolis extracts.

While originally sold as a medical health drink with carbonation added, the Japanese Ministry of Health and Welfare filed a claim resulting in the judgement that Oronamin C could not be labeled as a medical health drink. This was a difficult time for Otsuka Pharmaceutical Co., but before long, the Genki hatsuratsu (元気ハツラツ) television advertisement featuring comedian Kon Omura became recognizable nationwide, and Oronamin C grew into a best-selling health drink in Japan.

In the past, many competing companies have introduced similar health drinks in an attempt to topple the current market oligopoly, but so far, none have been successful (see § Similar products).

== Commercials ==
Oronamin C's slogan is Genki hatsuratsu (元気ハツラツ). (meaning 'full of vitality') The initial spokesperson for this campaign was comedian Kon Omura. This campaign appeared for about 10 years. In the mid-1960s television advertisements and enamel billboards were used for marketing Oronamin along with other Otsuka Group products. Japanese baseball players from the Yomiuri Giants also promoted Oronamin with the phrase "Oronamin is a small giant!" (オロナミンCは小さな巨人です!, Oronamin Shī wa Chiisana Kyōjin desu!). The tagline "C power becomes G power!" (CパワーがGパワーになる, Shī Pawā ga Jī Pawā ni Naru!) was also used in some advertisements.

The popular Japanese singing group SMAP's songs became featured in Oronamin commercials in 1994 and 1995. Around 2001, a television campaign called "Let's find the Yujiro of the 21st century!" debuted featuring actors from Ishihara International Productions, Inc. Since then, many famous tarento have promoted Oronamin. Hideki Matsui worked as a spokesperson for sister product Oronamin C Royal Prolis during his career with the Yomiuri Giants.

Another version of Oronamin television advertisements were broadcast along with the Giants version, featuring Yūzō Kayama and the Southern All Stars. The campaign slogan was "Clear distinction Oronamin C" (明るくケジメるオロナミンC, Akaruku kejimeru Oronamin Shī).

Starting in 2004 a tie-in was established with the hit Japanese Kamen Rider Series. Actors Takayuki Tsubaki, Shigeki Hosokawa, Hiro Mizushima, Takeru Satoh, Kōji Seto, and Masahiro Inoue; who appear in Kamen Rider Blade, Hibiki, Kabuto, Den-O, Kiva and Decade; have promoted Oronamin with special television commercials. in 2009, the animators who did the Fresh Pretty Cure! series also did the same. In 2016 saw Kamen Rider actors starring in commercials as a trio. These trios include Shun Nishime, Ryosuke Yamamoto and Hayato Isomura (Kamen Rider Ghost); Hiroki Iijima, Toshiki Seto and Ukyo Matsumoto (Kamen Rider Ex-Aid); Atsuhiro Inukai, Eiji Akaso and Kouhei Takeda (Kamen Rider Build); So Okuno, Gaku Oshida, and Keisuke Watanabe (Kamen Rider Zi-O); Fumiya Takahashi, Ryutaro Okada, and Hiroe Igeta (Kamen Rider Zero-One); Syuichiro Naito, Takaya Yamaguchi, and Ryo Aoki (Kamen Rider Saber); Kentaro Maeda (w/ Subaru Kimura), Wataru Hyuga and Ayaka Imoto (Kamen Rider Revice); Hideyoshi Kan, Ryuga Satoh, Yuna Hoshino (Kamen Rider Geats); Junsei Motojima, Reiyo Matsumoto and Yasunari Fujibayashi (Kamen Rider Gotchard); Hidekazu Chinen and Nozomi Miyabe (Kamen Rider Gavv); Ryutaro Imai and Maho Horiguchi (Kamen Rider ZEZTZ).

Current television commercials feature Japanese idol Aya Ueto as the main cast appearing along with a costar sports athlete or other celebrity. Aya's conversations with each celebrity are the topic of these commercials. The slogan also changed a little, to Genki hatsuratsū? (元気ハツラツぅ?). Initially her co-stars answered "Of course!" but now answer Sugē hatsuratsu! (すっげぇハツラツ!).

Selected tarento who have appeared with Aya Ueto:

- Tsuyoshi Shinjo (Hokkaido Nippon Ham Fighters baseball player; first baseball player to promote in this campaign)
- Bae Yong-joon (Korean actor)
- Hideaki Takizawa (actor, tarento; from the 2005 NHK Taiga drama Yoshitsune; Hideaki appears as Yoshitsune)
- Bobby Ologun (tarento, martial artist: in President)
- Kamenashi Kazuya and Jin Akanishi (KAT-TUN: in School Headmaster)
- Shunsuke Nakamura (Celtic F.C. soccer player: in Sports Newspaper Reporter)
- Michelle Wie (pro golfer: in Long Putt Knack)
- Obi Tenaka (actor, tarento)
- Kazuo Umezu (manga artist: in Teacher Umeza's Surprise)
- Ryo Nishikido, Tadayoshi Ohkura (Kanjani∞: in Kanjani Can't Enter?)
- Hakuhō Shō (Ōzeki sumo wrestler)
- Daisuke Takahashi (figure skater: in Outside Work)
- Tohoshinki (Korean boy group)
- Jackie Chan (actor, stuntman)
- Jun Hyun-moo (host)

== Genki hatsuratsū? advertisement battle ==
For about a half year starting May 9, 2005, the Genki hatsuratsū? advertisement battle was held for all young members of the Yoshimoto Kogyo Japanese entertainment conglomerate. Performers were to plan and create an original television commercial, and these commercials would compete against each other. The prize was 8,202 dollars and the possession of broadcasting rights in the winners hometown. Among the many contestants, Nibunnogo! was the winner with Tōtarutenbosu in second place. For a full list of participants see the Japanese Wikipedia Oronamin article.

== Oronamin shake ==
In 1971, a television advertisement "Home Party" introduced the recipe for the Oronamin Shake: Oronamin C mixed with a raw egg. Even today that recipe is featured on the Oronamin C recipe webpage, though using only an egg yolk is recommended nowadays. The television advertisement introduced the shake with the copy "My older sister and I have Oronamin and juice. Mom puts in an egg and has an Oronamin shake. Dad has Oronamin and gin." In 2004 a television advertisement featuring model Ai Tominaga (冨永愛 Tominaga Ai, born August 1, 1983) and singer-songwriter Shigeru Izumiya (泉谷しげる Izumiya Shigeru, born May 11, 1948) reintroduced the Oronamin shake.

== Similar products ==
- Minnamin C Drink (ミンナミンCドリンク) (Tamura Co., introduced 1991)
- Bonnu C (ボンヌC) (Bonnu Corporation, introduced May 1983 )
- Vitamin C Drink (ビタミンCドリンク) (All Japan Drug)
- Origomin C Drink (オリゴミンCドリンク) (Daikyo Yakuhin, including oligosaccharide)
- Vita Lemon C Drink (ビタレモンCドリンク) (Okuda Chemical Industry)
- Top Value C (トップバリュC) (Aiku, ÆON Co., Ltd.)
- Vita Amin C (ビタアミノC) (Automatic Sales)
- Vita Shii (Vitakku) Drink (ビタシー（ビタック）ドリンク) / Vita Shii (Vitakku) Drink Z (ビタシー（ビタック）ドリンクZ) (Tokiwa Pharmaceutical Co., Ltd.)
- Vita To C (ビタッとC) (Sanbon Coffee)
- Turbo C / New Turbo C (PepsiCo., same name as the C language compiler Turbo C)
- Baomin X (バイオミンX) / Dekavita C (デカビタC) (Suntoryfoods Limited)
- Miracle Body V (ミラクルボディV) (SANGARIA)
- Real Gold (リアルゴールド) (Coca-Cola Japan)
- Dodekamin (ドデカミン) / Dodekamin V (ドデカミンV) (Asahi Soft Drinks)
- Nice C (ナイスC) (Riken Pharmecauticals)
- Royal Top (ローヤルトップ) (Nagoya Milk)
- Oligomin C
- Citrumin C (Zam Zam cola company, UAE, Iran)
- Vitaene C (Pokka)
- C1000 (House Wellness Foods Corporation; part of House Foods; formerly produced by Takeda Pharmaceutical Company)
- C+ (Australia)
- Pocari Sweat (Otsuka Pharmaceutical)
