= Lead market =

Concept in innovation theory

Lead market is a term used in innovation theory and denotes a country or region which pioneers the successful adoption of an innovative design. It sends signalling effects to other "lag" markets, which in turn help in triggering a process of global diffusion.

Marian Beise, one of the foremost propounders of this theory as it has been understood so far, states: "Innovations that have been successful with local users in lead markets have a higher potential of becoming adopted world-wide than any other design preferred in other countries". Christoph Bartlett and Sumantra Ghoshal have described lead markets as

"markets that provide the stimuli for most global products and processes of a multinational company. Local innovations in such markets become useful elsewhere as the environmental characteristics that stimulated such innovations diffuse to other locations".

== Function ==
Lead markets are thought to help reduce market and technology uncertainty during a new product development process, and can be seen as an important driver for internationalization of research and development.

Lead markets can be characterized by factors such as high per capita income, high level of customer sophistication, and a competitive "eco-system". Such factors are subsumed into 5 "groups of advantages", namely demand advantage, market structure advantage, cost advantage, export advantage, and transfer advantage. Some scholars have also spoken of a regulation advantage, which emanates from favourable government policies (cf. Rennings and Smidt, 2010). Nevertheless, some other scholars have pointed towards regulation's impact on all other factors. For example, Tiwari and Herstatt state: "[...] we consider it appropriate, not to treat regulation as a separate group since policy factors influence all other groups of advantages and are implicitly covered by them."

The theory of lead markets has been criticized for not being "consistent and stringent". While conventional wisdom, due to its emphasis on customer affluence and sophistication as inducers of innovation, has tended to see lead markets exist in economically highly developed countries; recent research, notably by Rajnish Tiwari and Cornelius Herstatt of Hamburg University of Technology (TUHH) has emphasized the need to update/extend the lead market model to adjust it to the changing ground realities in the face of globalization and sustained economic growth in developing nations. Using examples of several frugal innovations from India, and more specifically the case of small car industry in India's automotive sector, Rajnish Tiwari in his TUHH dissertation has proposed that lead markets can emerge in developing nations as well provided that the market size enables significant economies of scale and the country's innovation system is endowed with the necessary technological capabilities. These two conditions, seen in conjunction with several other factors such as embeddedness in international trade and access to open global innovation networks (OGINs), can in many instances compensate other typical drawbacks of developing countries, such as low purchasing power. As a consequence, Tiwari's dissertation has proposed to update the model to include technology advantage in the model, while combining the export and transfer advantages as one single group. Factors within the individual groups of advantages have been also update/modified. The evolution of India's small car sector has also provided some valuable insights into possible emergence of a lead market in a country. This model, if validated by further research, would help enable an ex ante analysis of lead markets, whereas so far mostly ex post, macroeconomic analyses have been the norm.

The original lead market framework by Beise follows the a priori assumption that lead markets emerge on the national level. As this might not hold for every empirical case, research in economic geography suggests to add more spatial sensitivity to the framework. This has led to a refined version, the so-called concept of Regional Lead Markets.

In 2006 the European Commission committed itself to developing a strategy for innovation-friendly lead market development as an element of the European Union's overall innovation strategy.

== Examples ==
Germany can be seen as a lead market for renewable energies and (premium) automobiles, while the United States can be seen as a lead market for information technologies including e-commerce.
