= Toxicity category rating =

EPA ratings for hazards of pesticides

In 40 CFR 156.62, the Environmental Protection Agency established four Toxicity Categories for acute hazards of pesticide products, with "Category I" being the highest toxicity class. Most human hazard, precautionary statements, and human personal protective equipment statements are based upon the Toxicity Category of the pesticide product as sold or distributed. In addition, toxicity categories may be used for regulatory purposes other than labeling, such as classification for restricted use and requirements for child-resistant packaging.

In certain cases, statements based upon the Toxicity Category of the product as diluted for use are also permitted. A Toxicity Category is assigned for each of five types of acute exposure, as specified in the table below.

== Overview ==
The four toxicity categories, from one to four are:

- Toxicity category I is highly toxic and severely irritating,
- Toxicity category II is moderately toxic and moderately irritating,
- Toxicity category III is slightly toxic and slightly irritating,
- Toxicity category IV is practically non-toxic and not an irritant.

== Acute toxicity categories for pesticide products ==
In the following table, the leftmost column lists the route of administration.

	I	II	III	IV
Oral LD_{50}	Up to and including 50 mg/kg	From 50 to 500 mg/kg	From 500 to 5000 mg/kg	Greater than 5000 mg/kg
Inhalation LC50	Up to and including 0.2 mg/L	From 0.2 to 2 mg/L	From 2. to 20 mg/L	Greater than 20 mg/L
Dermal LD50	Up to and including 200 mg/kg	From 200 to 2000 mg/kg	From 2000 to 20,000 mg/kg	Greater than 20,000 mg/kg
Eye Effects	Corrosive; corneal opacity not reversible within 7 days	Corneal opacity reversible within 7 days; irritation persisting for 7 days	No corneal opacity; irritation reversible within 7 days	No irritation.
Skin Effects	Corrosive	Severe irritation at 72 hours	Moderate irritation at 72 hours	Mild or slight irritation at 72 hours
