= Paraquat =

Chemical compound used as an herbicide

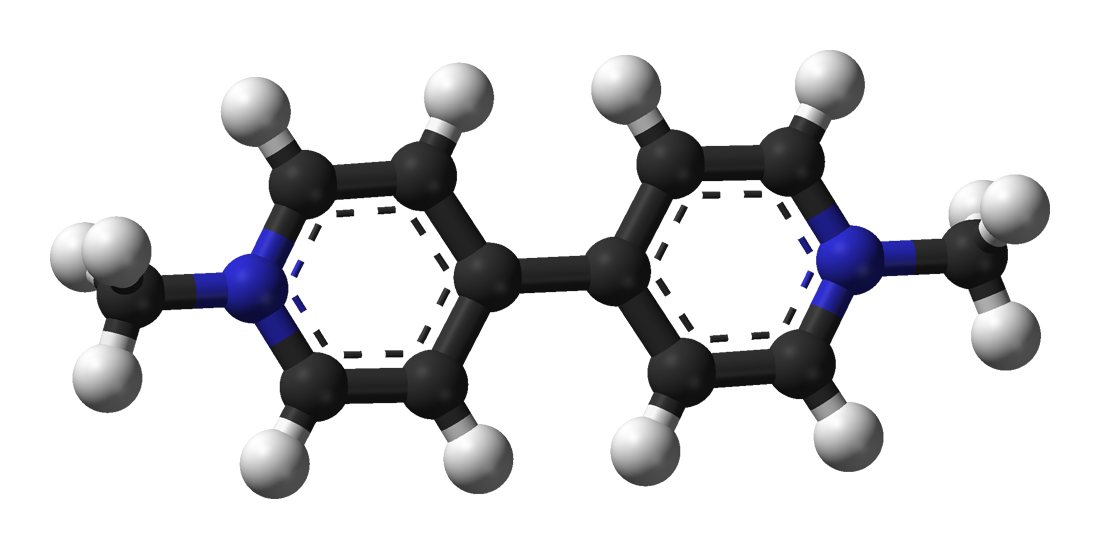

Names
- Preferred IUPAC name 1,1′-Dimethyl[4,4′-bipyridine]-1,1′-diium dichloride
- Other names Paraquat dichloride; Methyl viologen dichloride; MVCl_{2}; Crisquat; Dexuron; Esgram; Gramuron; Ortho Paraquat CL; Para-col; Pillarxone; Tota-col; Toxer Total; PP148; Cyclone; Gramixel; Gramoxone; Pathclear; AH 501; Bai Cao Ku.

Identifiers
CAS Number	1910-42-5
3D model (JSmol)	Interactive image
ChEBI	CHEBI:28786
ChEMBL	ChEMBL458019
ChemSpider	15146
ECHA InfoCard	100.016.015
IUPHAR/BPS	4552
PubChem CID	15938
UNII	2KZ83GSS73
CompTox Dashboard (EPA)	DTXSID7024243
- InChI: InChI=1S/C12H14N2.2ClH/c1-13-7-3-11(4-8-13)12-5-9-14(2)10-6-12;;/h3-10H,1-2H3;2*1H/q+2;;/p-2 Key: FIKAKWIAUPDISJ-UHFFFAOYSA-L; InChI=1/C12H14N2.2ClH/c1-13-7-3-11(4-8-13)12-5-9-14(2)10-6-12;;/h3-10H,1-2H3;2*1H/q+2;;/p-2/fC12H14N2.2Cl/h;2*1h/qm;2*-1; InChI=1/C12H14N2.2ClH/c1-13-7-3-11(4-8-13)12-5-9-14(2)10-6-12;;/h3-10H,1-2H3;2*1H/q+2;;/p-2 Key: FIKAKWIAUPDISJ-NUQVWONBAF
- SMILES: C[n+]1ccc(cc1)c2cc[n+](cc2)C.[Cl-].[Cl-]

Properties
Chemical formula	C_{12}H_{14}Cl_{2}N_{2}
Molar mass	257.16 g·mol^{−1}
Appearance	Yellow solid
Odor	faint, ammonia-like
Density	1.25 g/cm^{3}
Melting point	175 to 180 °C (347 to 356 °F; 448 to 453 K)
Boiling point	> 300 °C (572 °F; 573 K)
Solubility in water	High
Vapor pressure	<0.0000001 mmHg (20 °C)

Hazards
- Occupational safety and health (OHS/OSH)
Main hazards	Toxic, environmental hazard
- GHS labelling
Pictograms	(GHS06: Toxic) (GHS08: Health hazard) (GHS09: Environmental hazard)
Hazard statements	H301, H311, H315, H319, H330, H335, H372, H410
Precautionary statements	P260, P273, P280, P284, P301+P310, P305+P351+P338
NFPA 704 (fire diamond)	4 0 0
- Lethal dose or concentration (LD, LC)
LD_{50} (median dose)	57 mg/kg (rat, oral); 120 mg/kg (mouse, oral); 25 mg/kg (dog, oral); 22 mg/kg (guinea pig, oral)
LC_{50} (median concentration)	3 mg/m^{3} (mouse, 30 min respirable dust); 3 mg/m^{3} (guinea pig, 30 min respirable dust)
LC_{Lo} (lowest published)	1 mg/m^{3} (rat, respirable dust, 6 h); 6400 mg/m^{3} (rat, nonrespirable dust, 4 h)
- NIOSH (US health exposure limits)
PEL (Permissible)	TWA 0.5 mg/m^{3} (resp) [skin]
REL (Recommended)	TWA 0.1 mg/m^{3} (resp) [skin]
IDLH (Immediate danger)	1 mg/m^{3}
Safety data sheet (SDS)	Aldrich MSDS
- Except where otherwise noted, data are given for materials in their standard state (at 25 °C [77 °F], 100 kPa). Infobox references

Paraquat (trivial name; /ˈpærəkwɒt/), or N,N′-dimethyl-4,4′-bipyridinium dichloride (systematic name), also known as methyl viologen, is a toxic organic compound with the chemical formula [(C_{6}H_{7}N)_{2}]Cl_{2}. It is classified as a viologen, a family of redox-active heterocycles of similar structure. It is one of the most widely used herbicides worldwide. It is quick-acting and non-selective, killing green plant tissue on contact.

Paraquat is highly toxic to humans and other animals. The toxicity and lethality depends on the dose and how the herbicide is absorbed by the body. In humans, paraquat damages the mouth, stomach, and intestines if it is ingested orally. Once absorbed in the body, paraquat causes particular damage to the lungs, kidneys, and liver. Paraquat's lethality is attributed to its enhancing production of superoxide anions and human lung cells can accumulate paraquat. Paraquat exposure has been strongly linked to the development of Parkinson's disease.

Paraquat may be in the form of salt with chloride or other anions; quantities of the substance are sometimes expressed by cation mass alone (paraquat cation, paraquat ion). The name is derived from the para positions of the quaternary nitrogens.

== Production and redox reactions ==
Pyridine is coupled by treatment with sodium in ammonia followed by oxidation to give 4,4′-bipyridine. This chemical is then dimethylated with chloromethane to give the final product as the dichloride salt.

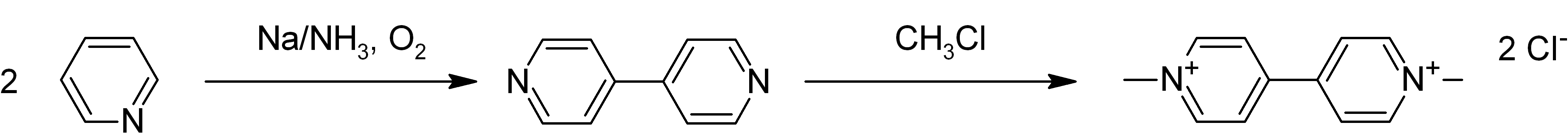

Use of other methylating agents gives the bispyridinium with alternate counterions. For example, Hugo Weidel's original synthesis used methyl iodide to produce the diiodide.

== Herbicide use ==
Although first synthesized by Weidel and Russo in 1882, paraquat's herbicidal properties were not recognized until 1955 in the Imperial Chemical Industries (ICI) laboratories at Jealott's Hill, Berkshire, England. Paraquat was first manufactured and sold by ICI in early 1962 under the trade name Gramoxone, and is today among the most commonly used herbicides.

Paraquat is classified as a non-selective contact herbicide. The key characteristics that distinguish it from other agents used in plant protection products are:

- It kills a wide range of annual grasses and broad-leaved weeds and the tips of established perennial weeds.
- It is very fast-acting.
- It is rain-fast within minutes of application.
- It is partially inactivated upon contact with soil.

These properties led to paraquat being used in the development of no-till farming.

The European Union approved the use of paraquat in 2004 but Sweden, supported by Denmark, Austria, and Finland, appealed this decision. In 2007, the court annulled the directive authorizing paraquat as an active plant protection substance stating that the 2004 decision was wrong in finding that there were no indications of neurotoxicity associated with paraquat and that the studies about the link between paraquat and Parkinson's disease should have been considered. Thus, paraquat has been banned in the European Union since 2007.

China also banned the domestic use of Paraquat in 2017; Thailand followed soon after in 2019 and Brazil, Chile, Malaysia, Peru and Taiwan between 2020 and 2022. India banned it in Odisha in 2023, and temporarily banned it in Kerala in 2011, though the pesticide is still widely used throughout the majority of the country. In May 2026 the U.S. state of Vermont banned it, with limited exceptions for certain fruit orchards until 2030, when the chemical will be banned entirely.

China, the United Kingdom, and Switzerland are responsible for the production of the majority of paraquat for worldwide usage, despite the fact that each of these countries has banned its usage domestically.

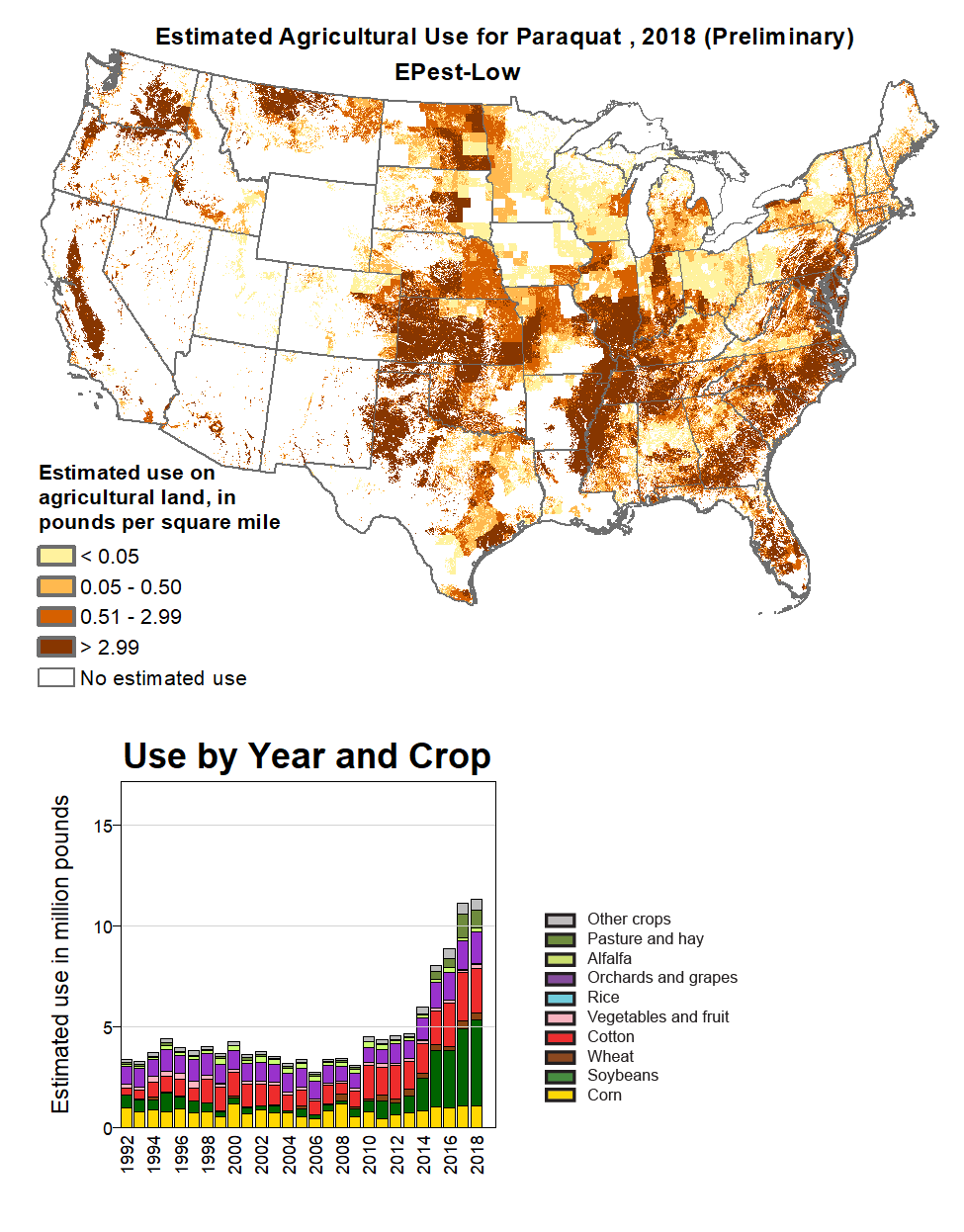
USGS estimate of paraquat use in the US to 2018

In the United States, paraquat is available primarily as a solution in various strengths. It is classified as a restricted use pesticide, which means that it can be used by licensed applicators only. According to an October 2021 estimate, the use of paraquat in US agriculture as mapped by the U.S. Geological Survey showed a doubling from 2013 to 2018, reaching 10,000,000 pounds (4,500,000 kg) annually, up from 1,054,000 pounds (478,000 kg) in 1974.

There is an ongoing international campaign for a global ban, but the cheap and popular paraquat continues to be unrestricted in most developing countries. The Chemical Review Committee (CRC) of the Rotterdam Convention recommended to the Conference of the Parties (COP) paraquat dichloride formulations for inclusion in Annex III to the Convention in 2011. A small group of countries, including India and Guatemala and supported by manufacturers, have since blocked the listing of paraquat as a hazardous chemical for the purposes of the Rotterdam Convention.

In Australia, paraquat is used as a herbicide to control annual grasses, broadleaf weeds and ryegrass in crops of chickpeas, faba beans, field peas, lupins, lentils and vetch. Aerial spraying is forbidden, as is harvesting within 2 weeks of application in some crops. The APVMA, circa 2026, decided to continue the use of paraquat and diquat, but cut the maximum permitted to spray on crops down from 1,150 g/Ha to 231 g/Ha, although spot-spraying techniques are excepted from that.

On the 8th of September 2026, the Australian Senate initiated an inquiry titled 'Continued use and regulation of paraquat' which is due to report on the Senate's first sitting date of 2027. The inquiry is being led by the Rural and Regional Affairs and Transport References Committee.

In India, paraquat dichloride 24% SL is widely used for broad-spectrum control of weeds on potato, cotton, rubber, wheat, tea, maize, rice, grapes, apple and aquatic weeds.

=== Regulation in the United States ===
In the United States paraquat was registered in 1964 and reregistered in 1997. EPA initiated registry review in 2011. Proposed Interim Mitigation Decisions were issued in 2016, requiring that the applicators be certified after completing new training requirements, and creating a new closed package system that prevents spills and new warning labels. The EPA released a draft human health and ecological assessment for public comment in October 2019 followed by the Proposed interim decision in October 2020 and Interim decision in July 2021. The Interim Decision included stricter measures to mitigate exposure to paraquat, including the use of respirators, time of use, level of use and proper licensing. A Petition for Review filed in September 2021 resulted in the EPA issuing a Preliminary Supplemental Consideration and a solicitation for public comments in February 2024.

=== Regulation elsewhere ===
Paraquat is banned in several countries in South America, West Africa, East Asia and the Middle East.

Paraquat is approved in South Africa, for use on cottonseed, maize, and sugarcane.

== Reactivity and mode of action ==
Paraquat, the dication on the left, functions as an electron acceptor, disrupting respiration in plants by forming the monocation at the center.

Paraquat is an oxidant that interferes with electron transfer, a process that is common to all life. Addition of one electron gives the radical cation:

[paraquat]^{2+} + e^{−} $\ce{<=>>}$ [paraquat]^{•+}

−0.446 V

The radical cation is also susceptible to further reduction to the neutral [paraquat]^{0}:

[paraquat]^{+} + e^{−} $\ce{<=>>}$ [paraquat]^{0}

−0.830 V

As an herbicide, paraquat acts by inhibiting photosynthesis. In light-exposed plants, it accepts electrons from photosystem I (more specifically ferredoxin, which is presented with electrons from PS I) and transfers them to molecular oxygen. In this manner, destructive reactive oxygen species (ROS) are produced. In forming these reactive oxygen species, the oxidized form of paraquat is regenerated, and is again available to shunt electrons from photosystem I to restart the cycle. This induces necrosis, and unlike with some mechanisms of necrosis, does not produce double-stranded breaks. Target weeds die within 4 days; symptoms can show after as little as a few hours.

Paraquat is often used in science to catalyze the formation of ROS, more specifically, the superoxide free radical. Paraquat will undergo redox cycling in vivo, being reduced by an electron donor such as NADPH, before being oxidized by an electron receptor such as dioxygen to produce superoxide, a major ROS.

== Weed resistance management ==
Problems with herbicide resistant weeds may be addressed by applying herbicides with different modes of action, along with cultural methods such as crop rotation, in integrated weed management (IWM) systems. Paraquat, with its distinctive mode of action, is one of few chemical options that can be used to prevent and mitigate problems with weeds that have become resistant to the very widely used non-selective herbicide glyphosate. Paraquat is a Group L (Aus), D (global), 22 (numeric) resistance class herbicide, which it shares with diquat and cyperquat.

One example is the "double knock" system used in Australia. Before planting a crop, weeds are sprayed with glyphosate first, then followed seven to ten days later by a paraquat herbicide. Although twice as expensive as using a single glyphosate spray, the "Double Knock" system is widely relied upon by farmers as a resistance management strategy. Nevertheless, herbicide resistance has been seen for both herbicides in a vineyard in Western Australia – though this singular report gives no indication of what regimen was being followed, particularly if the two herbicides were being used in a "double knock" tandem.

A computer simulation reported in the scientific journal Weed Research showed that with alternating annual use between glyphosate and paraquat, only one field in five would be expected to have glyphosate-resistant annual ryegrass (Lolium rigidum) after 30 years, compared to nearly 90% of fields sprayed only with glyphosate. A "Double Knock" regime with paraquat cleaning-up after glyphosate was predicted to keep all fields free of glyphosate resistant ryegrass for at least 30 years.

== Toxicity ==
=== Acute toxicity ===
Paraquat is toxic to humans (Category II) by the oral route and moderately toxic (Category III) through the skin. Pure paraquat, when ingested, is highly toxic to mammals, including humans, causing severe inflammation and potentially leading to severe lung damage (e.g., irreversible pulmonary fibrosis, also known as 'paraquat lung'), acute respiratory distress syndrome (ARDS), and death. The mortality rate is estimated between 60% and 90%.

Acute exposure to paraquat can cause a wide range of serious health effects, including confusion, acute kidney failure, liver failure, increased blood pressure or heart rate, damage to the heart, damage to the lungs leading to fluid-filled lungs and respiratory failure, weak muscles, extreme fatigue and lethargy, nausea or vomiting, diarrhea, and in severe cases, coma.

Paraquat is also toxic when inhaled and is in the Toxicity Category I (the highest of four levels) for acute inhalation effects. For agricultural uses, the United States Environmental Protection Agency (EPA) determined that particles used in agricultural practices (400–800 μm) are not in the respirable range. Paraquat also causes moderate to severe irritation of the eye and skin. Diluted paraquat used for spraying is less toxic; thus, the greatest risk of accidental poisoning is during mixing and loading paraquat for use.

The standard treatment for paraquat ingestion is first to remove as much as possible by pumping the stomach. Fuller's earth or activated charcoal may also improve outcomes depending on the timing. Haemodialysis, haemofiltration, haemoperfusion, or antioxidant therapy may also be suggested. Immunosuppressive therapy to reduce the inflammation is an approach suggested by some, however only low certainty evidence supports using medications such as glucocorticoids with cyclophosphamide in addition to the standard care to reduce mortality. It is also unknown if adding glucocorticoid with cyclophosphamide to the standard care has unwanted side effects such as increasing the risk of infection. Oxygen should not be administered unless SpO_{2} levels are below 92%, as high concentrations of oxygen intensify the toxic effects. Death may occur up to 30 days after ingestion.

Lung injury is a main feature of poisoning. Liver, heart, lung, and kidney failure can occur within several days to weeks that can lead to death up to 30 days after ingestion. Those who suffer large exposures are unlikely to survive. Chronic exposure can lead to lung damage, kidney failure, heart failure, and oesophageal strictures. The mechanism underlying paraquat's toxic damage to humans is still unknown. The severe inflammation is thought to be caused by the generation of highly reactive oxygen species and nitrite species that results in oxidative stress. The oxidative stress may result in mitochondrial toxicity and the induction of apoptosis and lipid peroxidation which may be responsible for the organ damage. It is known that the alveolar epithelial cells of the lung selectively concentrate paraquat. It has been reported that a small dose, even if removed from the stomach or spat out, can still cause death from fibrous tissue developing in the lungs, leading to asphyxiation.

Accidental deaths and suicides from paraquat ingestion are relatively common. For example, there are more than 5,000 suicides deaths in China from paraquat ingestion every year in part leading to China's ban in 2017. Long-term exposures to paraquat would most likely cause lung and eye damage, but reproductive/fertility damage was not found by the EPA in their review.

==== Use in suicide and murder ====
A large majority (93 percent) of fatalities from paraquat poisoning are suicides, which occur mostly in developing countries. For instance, in Samoa from 1979 to 2001, 70 percent of suicides were by paraquat poisoning. Trinidad and Tobago is particularly well known for its incidence of suicides involving the use of Gramoxone (commercial name of paraquat). In southern Trinidad, particularly in Penal–Debe from 1996 to 1997, 76 percent of suicides were by paraquat, 96 percent of which involved the over-consumption of alcohol such as rum. British fashion celebrity Isabella Blow died by suicide using paraquat in 2007. Paraquat is widely used as a suicide agent in developing countries because it is widely available at low cost. Further, the toxic dose is low (10 mL or 2 teaspoons is enough to kill). Campaigns exist to control or even ban paraquat, and there are moves to restrict its availability by requiring user education and the locking up of paraquat stores. When a 2011 South Korean law completely banned paraquat in the country, death by pesticide plummeted 46%, contributing to the decrease of the overall suicide rate.

The indiscriminate paraquat murders, which occurred in Japan in 1985, were carried out using paraquat as a poison. Paraquat was used in the UK in 1981 by a woman who poisoned her husband. American serial killer Steven David Catlin killed two of his wives and his adoptive mother with paraquat between 1976 and 1984. In 2022, a 22-year-old woman, Greeshma Raj, was found guilty of using paraquat for murdering her boyfriend, Sharon Raj, in Kerala, India.

==== "Paraquat pot" ====
During the late 1970s, a controversial program sponsored by the US government sprayed paraquat on cannabis fields in Mexico. Following Mexican efforts to eradicate marijuana and poppy fields in 1975, the United States government helped by sending helicopters and other technological assistance. Helicopters were used to spray the herbicides paraquat and 2,4-D on the fields; marijuana contaminated with these substances began to show up in US markets, leading to debate about the program.

Whether any injury came about due to the inhalation of paraquat-contaminated marijuana is uncertain. A 1995 study found that "no lung or other injury in cannabis users has ever been attributed to paraquat contamination". Also a United States Environmental Protection Agency manual states: "... toxic effects caused by this mechanism have been either very rare or nonexistent. Most paraquat that contaminates cannabis is pyrolyzed during smoking to dipyridyl, which is a product of combustion of the leaf material itself (including cannabis) and presents little toxic hazard."

=== Chronic toxicity ===
==== Parkinson's disease ====
According to the WHO (2022), some of the measures to prevent Parkinson's disease include "banning of pesticides (e.g., paraquat and chlorpyrifos) and chemicals (e.g., trichloroethylene) which have been linked to PD and develop safer alternatives as per WHO guidance" and "accelerate action to reduce levels of and exposure to air pollution, an important risk factor for PD". A 2011 study showed a link between paraquat use and Parkinson's disease in farm workers. A co-author of the paper said that paraquat increases production of certain oxygen derivatives that may harm cellular structures, and that people who used paraquat, or other pesticides with a similar mechanism of action, were more likely to develop Parkinson's. A 2013 meta-analysis published in Neurology found that "exposure to paraquat ... was associated with about a 2-fold increase in risk" of Parkinson's disease. A review in 2021 concluded that the available evidence does not support a causal conclusion. In 2022 and 2023, two reviews from India "decisively demonstrated that paraquat is a substantial stimulant of oxidative stress … and is associated with Parkinson's disease (PD)"; and stated that "From the studies we can consider that PQ and MB with its combined effects has tremendous contribution towards neurodegeneration in PD."

In the UK, the use of paraquat was banned in 2007, but the manufacture and export of the herbicide is still permitted. In April 2022, the BBC reported that some UK farmers had called for a ban on British production of paraquat, and stated that "There is no scientific consensus and many conflicting studies on any possible association between Paraquat and Parkinson's". In the US, a class action lawsuit against Syngenta is ongoing; the company rejects the claims but has paid £187.5 million into a settlement fund. As of August 2024, more than 5,700 cases against Syngenta (manufacturer of Gramoxone) and Chevron (the former distributor) are pending in the paraquat multidistrict litigation in the US; the first of 10 bellwether trials will start in 2024. On April 15, 2025, attorneys representing plaintiffs in the multidistrict litigation entered into a settlement agreement. The settlement came as the first bellwether trial was six months away.

In August 2024, the British Columbia Supreme Court certified a class-action lawsuit against Syngenta on behalf of at least two plaintiffs who were diagnosed with Parkinson's after exposure to paraquat.

According to the National Institute of Environmental Health Sciences (NIEHS), part of the National Institutes of Health in the U.S., pesticide exposure has consistently been associated with the onset of Parkinson's disease.

- A 17-year long, NIEHS-funded study of the links between Parkinson's disease, environment, and genes shows that some pesticides, including paraquat, maneb, ziram, benomyl, and several organophosphate pesticides, including diazinon and chlorpyrifos, contribute to Parkinson's disease onset and progression.
- People with Parkinson's disease who are exposed to a high level of ten different active ingredients in agricultural pesticides may see their motor and non-motor symptoms progress faster compared with those who are not, a 2022 study found.
- Other NIEHS research found that people who occupationally used two pesticides, rotenone or paraquat, developed Parkinson's disease 2.5 times more often than non-users.
- In addition, people exposed to pesticides in the home or garden may face a greater chance of developing Parkinson's disease.
- Pesticides may directly or indirectly disrupt the biological pathways that normally protect dopaminergic neurons, the brain cells selectively attacked by the disease.
- Some pesticides, like rotenone, can directly block the function of mitochondria, the structures that create energy to run the cell. NIEHS researchers showed in mice that disrupting mitochondria through exposure to rotenone early in development changed the epigenome—the chemical tags that turn genes on and off—in ways that persisted throughout life.
- Other pesticides, like paraquat, have been found to increase production of free radicals that can damage cells.

Some people are more vulnerable to the harmful effects of pesticides because of their age or genetic makeup.

- Many studies identified genetic variations that provide insight into why certain people appear to be at higher risk of developing Parkinson's.
- Using data from a NIEHS-conducted agricultural health study, researchers found that Parkinson's risk from paraquat use was particularly high in people with a particular variant of a gene known as GSTT1.
- Similarly, other research has indicated that people with lower levels of the PON1 gene, which is important for the metabolism of organophosphate pesticides, showed faster progression of the disease.

Further research into links between preventable exposures and Parkinson's disease, as well as preventative therapies, could help reduce the incidence of the disease. For example, using protective gloves and other hygiene practices reduced the risk of Parkinson's disease among farmers using paraquat, permethrin, and trifluralin.
