= Chicago Tylenol murders =

Unsolved 1982 mass poisoning in Chicago, US

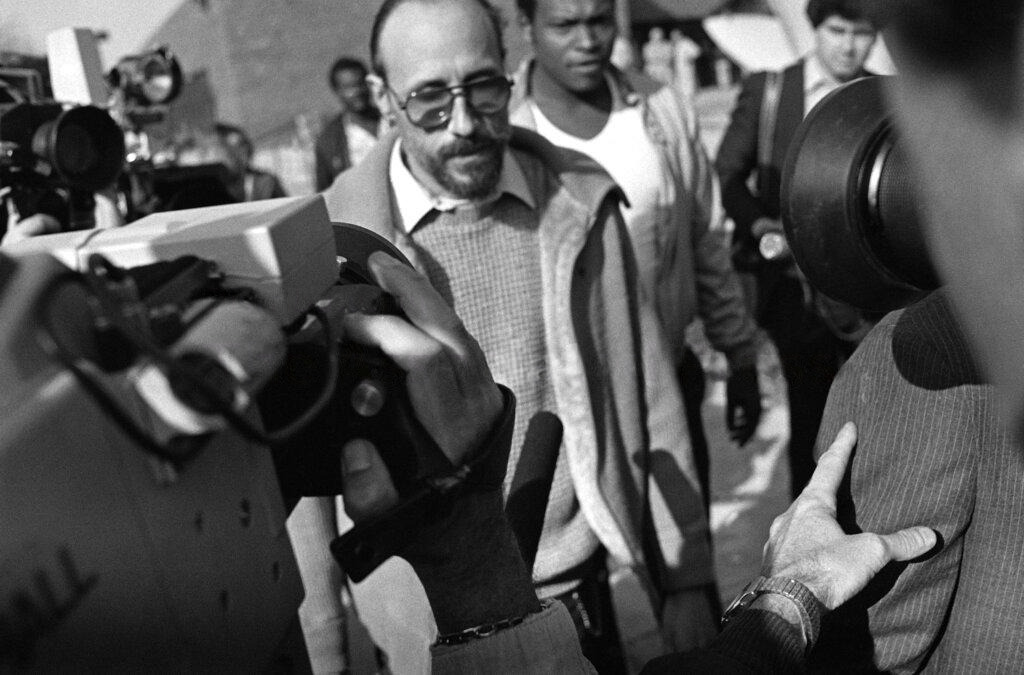
- Roger Arnold leaving a Chicago court during the Tylenol murders investigation. Arnold was not charged in connection with the murders.
- Location: Chicago metropolitan area, U.S.
- Date: September – October 1982
- Target: Retail consumers
- Attack type: Mass poisoning, mass murder
- Deaths: At least 7
- Perpetrator: Unknown
- Motive: Unknown

The Chicago Tylenol murders were an unsolved series of poisoning deaths resulting from drug tampering in the Chicago metropolitan area in 1982. The victims consumed Tylenol branded acetaminophen (paracetamol) powder-filled capsules that had been adulterated with potassium cyanide. At least seven people died in the original poisonings, and there were several more deaths in subsequent copycat crimes.

No suspect has been charged or convicted of the poisonings as of 2026. New York City resident James W. Lewis was convicted of extortion for sending a letter to Tylenol's then-manufacturer, Johnson & Johnson, that claimed responsibility for the deaths and demanded $1 million to stop them, but when he was discovered, he said the letter's claim was false, and further investigation failed to establish his involvement. The incidents led to a discontinuation of the use of powder-filled capsules for over-the-counter medicines, reforms in medication packaging, and federal anti-tampering laws.

== Deaths and early public safety efforts ==
On September 28, 1982, 12-year-old Mary Kellerman was hospitalized after consuming a capsule of Extra-Strength Tylenol; she died the next day. On September 29, six other individuals consumed contaminated Tylenol, including Adam Janus (27), Stanley Janus (25), and Theresa Janus (19), who each took Tylenol from a single bottle. All six—the Januses, Mary McFarland (31), Paula Prince (35), and Mary Reiner (27)—would ultimately die from consuming the pills.

Asked to investigate the Januses' deaths, nurse Helen Jensen, Arlington Heights's only public health official, visited the Janus household and discovered a Tylenol bottle with an accompanying receipt indicating it had been purchased the same day. Noticing that there were six pills missing, she turned the bottle over to investigator Nick Pishos and reported her suspicion that it was related to the Januses' deaths. Pishos called Edmund R. Donoghue, deputy chief medical examiner for Cook County, who, suspecting that cyanide may be the culprit, asked Pishos to smell the bottle. When Pishos smelled an almond-like scent, Donoghue asked the county's chief toxicologist, Michael Schaffer, to test the capsules, and Schaffer's team determined that four of the 44 remaining capsules from the Janus' bottle contained nearly three times the fatal amount of cyanide. Authorities held a press conference advising the public not to take Tylenol for the time being.

By chance, the bottle of Tylenol that Kellerman used was inventoried by paramedics. Investigators noticed that the Janus bottle and the Kellerman bottle came from the same lot, MC2880, and Johnson & Johnson issued a recall for all Tylenol from that lot. But when tainted bottles from other lots were discovered (for example, the pills in Mary McFarland's possession were traced to lots 1910 MD and MB 2738), the recall expanded to cover any bottle of extra-strength capsules (from any lot) purchased in the Chicago area, making it one of the largest pharmaceutical recalls ever.

A multi-agency investigation found the tampered pills to have been sold or on the shelves at a variety of stores in the Chicago area, including two different Jewel Foods locations (one in Arlington Heights, one in Elk Grove Village); an Osco Drug store (in Schaumburg); a Walgreens and a Dominick's (both in Chicago); and a Frank's Finer Foods (in Winfield). One bottle had been purchased but, because she "sensed something was off", not yet used by the woman who purchased it.

In an effort to reassure the public, Johnson & Johnson, the manufacturer of Tylenol, distributed warnings to hospitals and distributors and halted Tylenol production and advertising. After other incidents, like strychnine added to Tylenol bottles in California, a nationwide recall of Tylenol products was issued on October 5, 1982; an estimated 31 million bottles were in circulation, with a retail value of over US$100 million (equivalent to $334 million in 2025). The company also advertised in the national media for individuals not to consume any of its products that contained acetaminophen after it was determined that only these capsules had been tampered with. Johnson & Johnson also offered to exchange all Tylenol capsules already purchased by the public for solid tablets.

Customs at airports outside the U.S. asked visitors if they brought Tylenol medicine with them.

== Police investigation ==
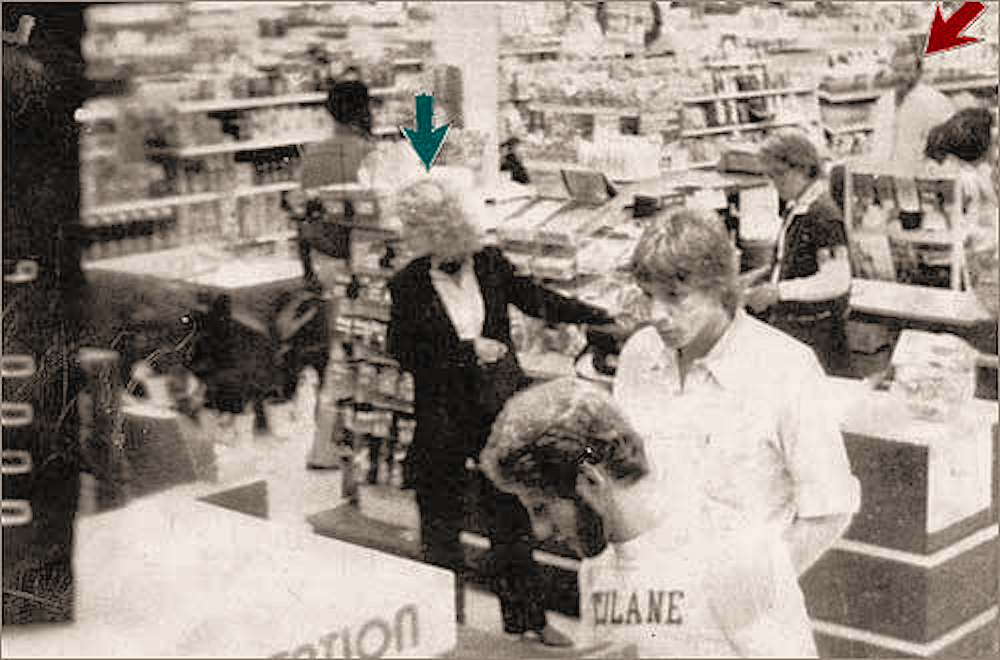
Surveillance photo of Tylenol killer victim Paula Prince (green arrow) purchasing cyanide-tampered Tylenol. Police suggested that the bearded man, marked by a red arrow, could be the killer.

The tainted capsules were found to have been manufactured at two different locations, Pennsylvania and Texas, suggesting that the capsules were tampered with after the product had been placed on store shelves for sale. The police hypothesis was that someone had taken bottles off shelves in local stores of the Chicago area, placed potassium cyanide in some of the capsules, and then placed the packages back on the store shelves to be purchased by unknowing customers. In addition to the five bottles that led to the victims' deaths, a few other contaminated bottles were later discovered in the Chicago area.

In early 1983, at the FBI's request, Chicago Tribune columnist Bob Greene published the address and grave location of the first and youngest victim, Mary Kellerman. The story, written with the Kellerman family's consent, was proposed by FBI criminal analyst John Douglas on the theory that the perpetrator(s) might visit the house or gravesite if they were made aware of their locations. Both sites were kept under 24-hour video surveillance for several months, but the killer did not surface.

A surveillance photo of Paula Prince purchasing cyanide-tampered Tylenol at a Walgreens drugstore in Chicago was released by the Chicago Police Department. Police suggested that a bearded man seen just feet behind Prince could be the killer.

=== Suspects ===
During the initial investigation, James William Lewis (also known as Robert Richardson) was accused of sending a letter to Johnson & Johnson demanding $1 million to stop the cyanide-induced murders. Upon his arrest, Lewis told authorities how the person behind the attacks may have carried out the killings—by buying Tylenol, adding cyanide to the bottles, and returning them to the store shelves. Lewis was also found to have previously possessed a poisoning book, and, according to a confidential law-enforcement document, his fingerprints were discovered on pages related to cyanide. Lewis denied being responsible for the poisonings, but he admitted to writing the letter, which he said he had worked on for three days.

During the trial, his attorneys claimed that Lewis "intended only to focus the attention of the authorities on his wife's former employer". Lewis was convicted of extortion and sentenced to 10 years in prison. In 2007, authorities determined that the letter had an October 1, 1982, postmark, meaning that, if Lewis's three-day timeline was accurate, he would have begun working on the letter prior to the first news reports concerning the poisonings. When confronted with this information, Lewis recanted his timeline. Court documents released in early 2009 "show Department of Justice investigators concluded Lewis was responsible for the poisonings, despite the fact that they did not have enough evidence to charge him". In January 2010, both Lewis and his wife submitted DNA samples and fingerprints to authorities. Lewis said "if the FBI plays it fair, I have nothing to worry about". The DNA samples did not match any DNA recovered on the bottles. Lewis continued to deny responsibility for the poisonings. Lewis died on July 9, 2023, at age 76.

Police also investigated a second man, Roger Arnold, a dock worker at a Jewel-Osco in Melrose Park, who told officers that he possessed potassium cyanide. Bar owner Marty Sinclair, whose establishment Arnold frequented, reported Arnold to the police, saying that Arnold had discussed killing people with a white powder and had become increasingly erratic after his marriage had dissolved. Arnold had worked with victim Mary Reiner's father at a warehouse, and Arnold's wife had been treated at a hospital across the street from the store in which Reiner bought her cyanide-laced pills. A copy of The Poor Man's James Bond, which contained instructions on making potassium cyanide, was found in Arnold's home. Arnold was held several times by the police, but never charged. In the summer of 1983, Arnold, mistaking a random passerby named John Stanisha for Sinclair, shot and killed the man, a computer consultant and father of three, who was leaving a bar with multiple friends. Arnold was convicted of the killing in January 1984 and served 15 years of his 30-year sentence for murder, saying in 1996 from prison: "I killed a man, a perfectly innocent person. I had choices. I could have walked away." He died in June 2008. In 2010, Arnold's body was exhumed (and subsequently reburied) so that his femur could be removed for DNA testing. Arnold's DNA did not match the DNA samples discovered on the bottles.

=== 21st-century investigations ===
In early January 2009, Illinois authorities renewed the investigation. Federal agents searched the home of James W. Lewis in Cambridge, Massachusetts, and seized a number of items. In Chicago, an FBI spokesman declined to comment but said "we'll have something to release later possibly".

In 2010, DNA samples were collected from James W. Lewis and from the corpse of Roger Arnold, which was exhumed for that purpose; neither's DNA matched DNA samples found on the tainted bottles.

Law-enforcement officials received a number of tips related to the case coinciding with its 25th anniversary. In a written statement, the FBI explained,

This review was prompted, in part, by the recent 25th anniversary of this crime and the resulting publicity. Further, given the many recent advances in forensic technology, it was only natural that a second look be taken at the case and recovered evidence.

On May 19, 2011, the FBI requested DNA samples from "Unabomber" Ted Kaczynski in connection to the Tylenol murders. Kaczynski denied having ever possessed potassium cyanide. The first four Unabomber crimes happened in Chicago and its suburbs from 1978 to 1980, and Kaczynski's parents had a suburban Chicago home in Lombard, Illinois, in 1982, where he stayed occasionally.

On September 23, 2026, a cold case detective of the Ada County, Idaho sheriff's office announced the identification of a man who had died in December 1982 by taking a cyanide capsule inside a Catholic church, who had been dubbed "The Unknown Wanderer". DNA testing confirmed he was Mathew Francis Betkouski, and the investigation uncovered possible ties to the Tylenol murders. While they did not name Betkouski as a suspect, Idaho officials provided further information to Chicago authorities for new leads. According to authorities, colleagues of Betkouski said he was interested in cyanide and the idea of the "perfect crime", and photos showed that he had visited the Chicago area a year before the poisonings.

== Aftermath ==
=== Copycats ===
Hundreds of copycat attacks involving Tylenol, other over-the-counter medications, and other products also took place around the United States immediately following the Chicago deaths.

Three more deaths occurred in 1986 from gelatin capsules.

Diane Elsroth, 23, died in Yonkers, New York, after ingesting Extra-Strength Tylenol capsules laced with cyanide.

Excedrin capsules in Washington state were tampered with, resulting in the deaths of Susan Snow and Bruce Nickell from cyanide poisoning and the eventual arrest and conviction of Bruce Nickell's wife, Stella Nickell, for her intentional actions in the crimes connected to both murders.

That same year, Procter & Gamble's Encaprin was recalled after a spiking hoax in Chicago and Detroit that resulted in a precipitous sales drop and a withdrawal of the pain reliever from the market.

In 1991 in Washington state, Kathleen Daneker and Stanley McWhorter were killed from two cyanide-tainted boxes of Sudafed, and Jennifer Meling went into a coma from a similar poisoning but recovered shortly thereafter. Jennifer's husband, Joseph Meling, was convicted on numerous charges in a federal Seattle court regarding the deaths of Daneker and McWhorter and the attempted murder of his wife, who was abused during the Melings' marriage. Meling was sentenced to life imprisonment and lost an appeal for a retrial.

In 1986, University of Texas student Kenneth Faries was found dead in his apartment after succumbing to cyanide poisoning. Tampered Anacin capsules were determined to be the source of the cyanide found in his body. His death was ruled a homicide on May 30, 1986. On June 19, 1986, the AP reported that the Travis County Medical Examiner ruled his death a likely suicide. The FDA determined he obtained the poison from a lab in which he worked.

=== Johnson & Johnson response ===
Johnson & Johnson received positive coverage for its handling of the crisis: an article in The Washington Post said, "Johnson & Johnson has effectively demonstrated how a major business ought to handle a disaster". The article further stated that "this is no Three Mile Island accident in which the company's response did more damage than the original incident", and applauded the company for being honest with the public.

In addition to issuing the recall, the company established relations with the Chicago Police Department, the FBI, and the Food and Drug Administration. This way it could have a part in searching for the person who laced the capsules and they could help prevent further tampering.

While at the time of the scare the company's market share collapsed from 35 percent to 8 percent, it rebounded in less than a year, a move credited to the company's prompt and aggressive reaction. In November, it reintroduced capsules in a new, triple-sealed package, coupled with heavy price promotions. Within several years, Tylenol regained the highest market share for the over-the-counter analgesic in the US.

==== Insurance claim denied ====
After the recall, Johnson & Johnson subsidiary McNeil Laboratories submitted a claim to its insurance company, Affiliated FM Insurance, for the cost of carrying out the recall, a claim which was later denied. A lawsuit determined that McNeil Laboratories was ultimately not covered because the parent company Johnson & Johnson elected not to buy more expensive recall insurance. McNeil sued again in court, further contending that the language of its excess liability insurance policy covered the recall and recall-related expenses. The court hearing that case rejected a claim of liability, stating that the recall "was not caused by liability for the seven deaths; it was at best merely related to the seven deaths in that they served as notice to the plaintiff that the Tylenol remaining on the shelves was potentially harmful".

In 1991, Johnson & Johnson agreed to settle, for an undisclosed sum, all lawsuits against it for the original Chicago area deaths. Robert Kniffin, a spokesman for Johnson & Johnson, stated that "though there is no way we could have anticipated a criminal tampering with our product or prevented it, we wanted to do something for the families and finally get this tragic event behind us."

The crisis management response, taught today as a model of corporate public relations, is chiefly credited to public relations executive Harold Burson.

=== Pharmaceutical changes ===
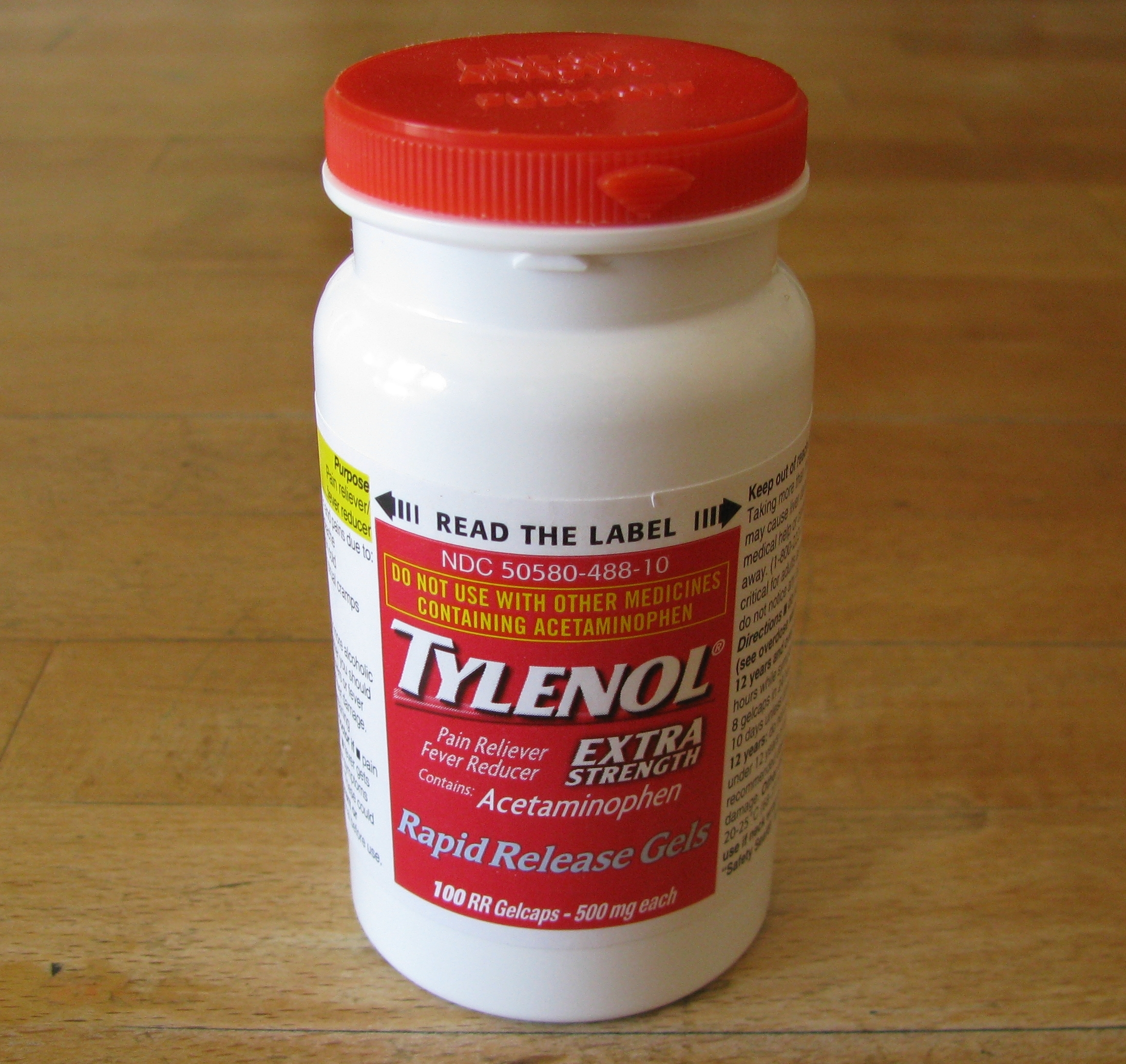
Tamper-resistant packaging for drugs such as Tylenol was implemented after the murders.

The 1982 incident inspired the pharmaceutical, food, and consumer product industries to develop tamper-resistant packaging, such as induction seals and improved quality control methods. Moreover, product tampering was made a federal crime. The new laws resulted in Stella Nickell's conviction in the Excedrin tampering case, for which she was sentenced to 90 years in prison.

Additionally, the incident prompted the pharmaceutical industry to move away from powder-filled capsules, which were easy to contaminate as a foreign substance could be placed inside without obvious signs of tampering. Within the year, the FDA introduced more stringent regulations to avoid product tampering. This led to the eventual replacement of the capsule with the solid "caplet", a tablet made in the shape of a capsule, as a drug delivery form and with the addition of tamper-evident safety seals to bottles of many sorts.

=== Halloween 1982 ===
While poisoned candy being given to trick-or-treaters at Halloween has never been documented, the Tylenol incident, which unfolded across October 1982, raised renewed fears of it. Some communities discouraged trick-or-treating for Halloween, and American grocery stores reported that candy sales were down over 20%.

== See also ==
- List of multiple homicides in Illinois
- List of unsolved murders (1980–1999)
- Paraquat murders
