= Tampering (quality control) =

Tampering in the context of a controlled process is adjusting the process on the basis of outcomes which are within the expected range of variability. The net result is to re-align the process so that an increased proportion of the output is out of specification. The term was introduced in this context by W. Edwards Deming, and he was a strong proponent of using control charts to avoid tampering.

== See also ==
- Incentive program
- Control chart
