= Tampering (crime) =

Forms of sabotage that are harmful to consumers

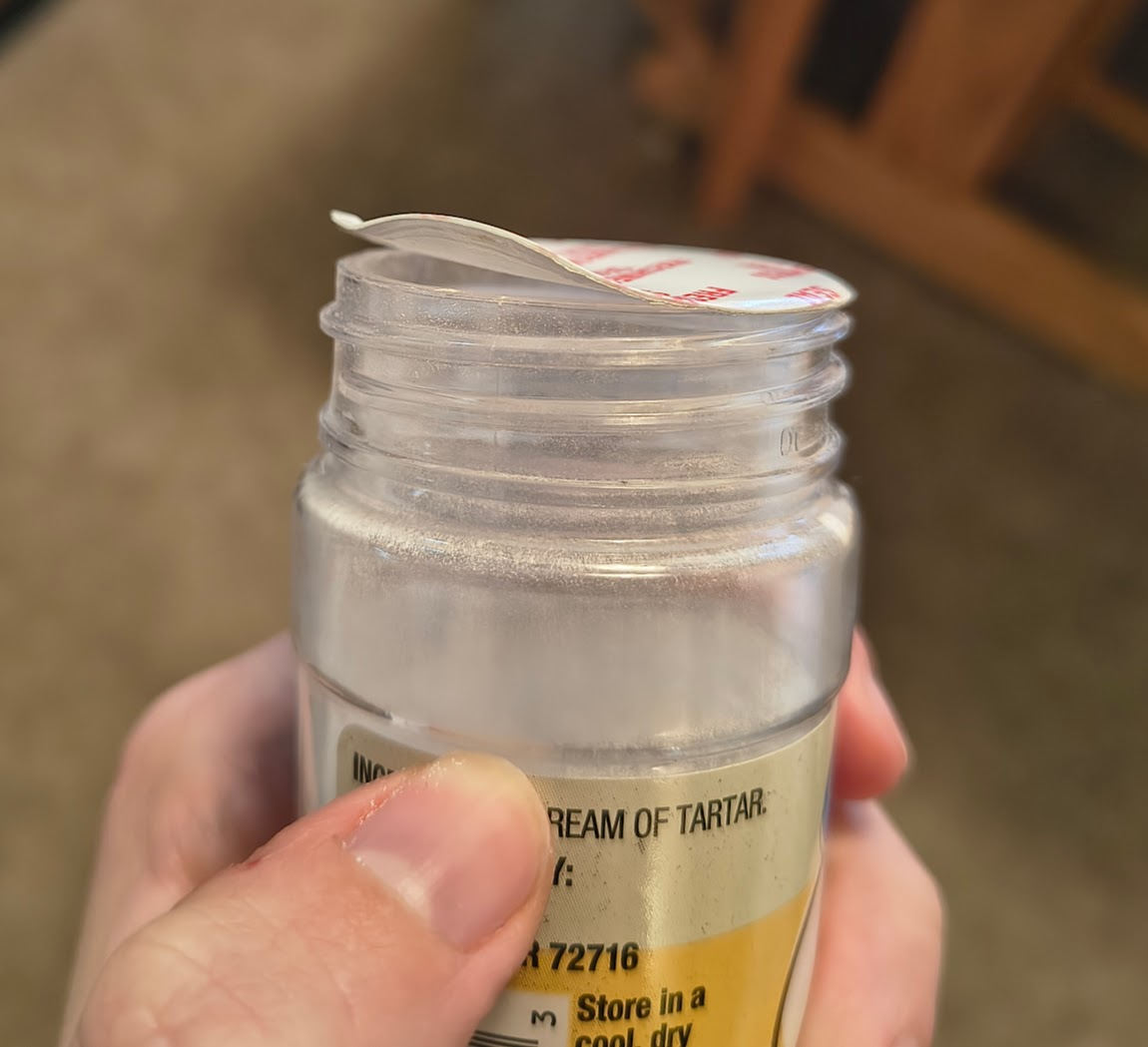
A Cream of Tartar spice container with a broken safety seal.

Tampering can refer to many forms of sabotage but the term is often used to mean intentional modification of products in a way that would make them harmful to the consumer. This threat has prompted manufacturers to make products that are either difficult to modify or at least difficult to modify without warning the consumer that the product has been tampered with. Since the person making the modification is typically long gone by the time the crime is discovered, many of these cases are never solved.

The crime is often linked with attempts to extort money from the manufacturer, and in many cases no contamination to a product ever takes place. Fraud is sometimes handled as a matter of civil law, but actual modification of products is almost always a matter of criminal law.

== Examples ==
=== 1982 Chicago Tylenol murders ===
Seven people died in this incident in the United States after taking medication that had been contaminated with cyanide. One man was later convicted of extortion, but no one was convicted of the murders. In 2009, the Federal Bureau of Investigation announced that it was re-examining the case. This event led to new requirements for tamper-evident seals on over-the-counter medications and changes in US tampering laws.

=== 1985 Paraquat murders ===
At least twelve people died and a further thirty-five became seriously ill in the paraquat murders, which were a series of indiscriminate beverage poisonings carried out in western and central Japan in 1985. The drinks were contaminated with the herbicide paraquat dichloride and one with diquat. The incident is possibly the deadliest product-tampering case in history. Police were unable to gather any evidence about the murders, and the case remains unsolved.

=== 2018 Australian strawberry contamination ===
A strawberry tampering crisis where sewing needles were found in a large number of consumer strawberry brands in several Australian states, leading to supermarkets halting strawberry sales for weeks, and forcing farms to dump and burn hundreds of tonnes of produce.

=== Foreign objects ===
Tampering cases often involve foreign objects in food products. These cases often focus on determining whether the contamination occurred during manufacturing, either accidentally or intentionally, or whether the claims made by the complaining customers are real or fraudulent.

=== Fraudulent claims ===
A famous case involving claims by customers that had tainted the products themselves was a series of claims in 1993 of needles found in Pepsi products. The manufacturer convincingly demonstrated that the contamination could not have taken place at the bottling plant, and several people were proven to have put the needles in themselves.

=== Hardware Trojan ===
Hardware Trojan (HT), malicious modification of the circuitry of an integrated circuit.
