= Diquat =

Diquat dibromide

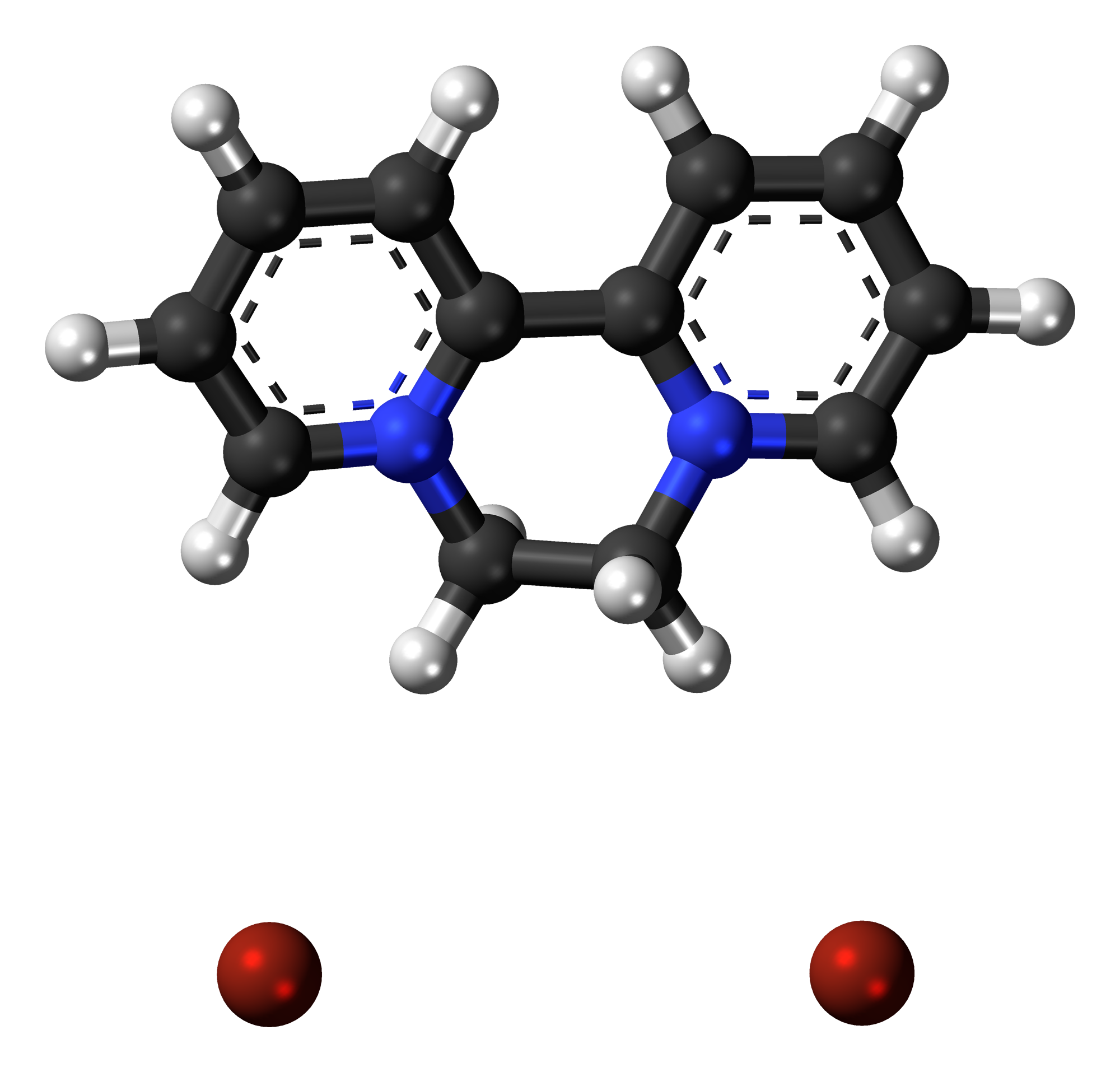

Names
- IUPAC name 6,7-dihydrodipyrido[1,2-a:2′,1′-c]pyrazine-5,8-diium dibromide
- Other names 1,1′-Ethylene-2,2′-bipyridyldiylium dibromide

Identifiers
- Compounds; Dibromide: Diquat dibromide; Dichloride: Diquat dichloride; Dication: Diquat dication
CAS Number	Dibromide: 85-00-7; Dichloride: 4032-26-2; Dication: 2764-72-9
3D model (JSmol)	Dibromide: Interactive image
ChEMBL	Dibromide: ChEMBL1599022
ChemSpider	Dibromide: 6536
ECHA InfoCard	100.001.436
KEGG	Dication: C18577
PubChem CID	Dibromide: 6794; Dichloride: 19943; Dication: 6795
UNII	Dibromide: 6BDV3T272W; Dication: A9A615U4MP
CompTox Dashboard (EPA)	Dibromide: DTXSID3024075
- InChI: InChI=1S/C12H12N2.2BrH/c1-3-7-13-9-10-14-8-4-2-6-12(14)11(13)5-1;;/h1-8H,9-10H2;2*1H/q+2;;/p-2 Key: ODPOAESBSUKMHD-UHFFFAOYSA-L; Dichloride: InChI=1S/C12H12N2.2ClH/c1-3-7-13-9-10-14-8-4-2-6-12(14)11(13)5-1;;/h1-8H,9-10H2;2*1H/q+2;;/p-2 Key: SKYNPRKUXHXZFJ-UHFFFAOYSA-L; Dication: InChI=1S/C12H12N2/c1-3-7-13-9-10-14-8-4-2-6-12(14)11(13)5-1/h1-8H,9-10H2/q+2 Key: SYJFEGQWDCRVNX-UHFFFAOYSA-N
- SMILES: Dibromide: C1[n+]2ccccc2-c3cccc[n+]3C1.[Br-].[Br-]

Properties
Chemical formula	C_{12}H_{12}Br_{2}N_{2}
Molar mass	344.050 g·mol^{−1}
Appearance	White/yellow crystals
Density	1.61 g/cm^{3}
Melting point	Decomposes
Solubility in water	71.8% (20 °C)
log P	−4.6
Vapor pressure	0.01 mPa (20 °C)

Hazards
- GHS labelling
Pictograms	(GHS06: Toxic) (GHS07: Exclamation mark) (GHS08: Health hazard) (GHS09: Environmental hazard)
NFPA 704 (fire diamond)	4 0 0
- NIOSH (US health exposure limits)
REL (Recommended)	TWA 0.5 mg/m^{3}
- Except where otherwise noted, data are given for materials in their standard state (at 25 °C [77 °F], 100 kPa). Infobox references

Diquat is the ISO common name for an organic dication that, as a salt with counterions such as bromide or chloride is used as a contact herbicide that produces desiccation and defoliation. Diquat is no longer approved for use in the European Union, although its registration in many other countries including the USA is still valid.

== Synthesis ==
Pyridine is oxidatively coupled to form 2,2′-bipyridine over a heated Raney nickel catalyst. The ethylene bridge is formed by the reaction with 1,2-dibromoethane

== History ==
Diquat's herbicidal properties were recognized in 1955 in the Imperial Chemical Industries (ICI) laboratories at Jealott's Hill, following its first synthesis at ICI's Dyestuffs Division in Blackley, England. It was active on test plants at application rates as low as 0.1 lb/acre. It was found that only those quaternary salts which were capable of being converted by reducing agents to radical cations had herbicidal activity and another of these was paraquat, which was more effective as a non-selective herbicide than diquat. Initial attempts to commercialize diquat focused on its ability to control broadleaved annual weeds while damage to cereal crops was, by comparison, minor. However, the auxin herbicides including ICI's MCPA were more selective and hence this use of diquat was unattractive. Instead, diquat was combined with the use of specialised mechanised equipment which by the late 1950s was becoming common in the harvesting of crops such as potatoes. A concern in that use was the possibility that the compound could cause stem-end rot, but protocols were developed that overcame this problem and it was introduced commercially for potato haulm desiccation in 1961. In the mid 1960s, diquat's use was extended to the pre-harvest desiccation of oilseed crops such as sunflower, linseed, cotton and soya. The patent to the active ingredient has now expired in all countries.

== Mode of action ==
When acting as a herbicide, diquat inhibits photosynthesis. In light-exposed plants, it accepts an electron from photosystem I (more specifically ferredoxin), to form its green radical cation:

[diquat]^{2+} + e^{−} $\ce{<=>>}$ [diquat]^{+•}

The electron is then transferred to molecular oxygen, producing destructive reactive oxygen species. In forming these, the diquat dication is regenerated and is again available to shunt electrons from photosystem I to restart the cycle.

The HRAC resistance classification puts diquat in Group L (Aus), Group D (global), Group 22 (numeric).

== Formulation ==
Diquat is made available to end users only in formulated products. Since it has extremely high solubility in water, modern formulations contain up to 40% of the active dibromide salt.

== Usage ==
All pesticides are required to seek registration from appropriate authorities in the country in which they will be used. In the United States, the Environmental Protection Agency (EPA) is responsible for regulating pesticides under the Federal Insecticide, Fungicide, and Rodenticide Act (FIFRA) and the Food Quality Protection Act (FQPA). A pesticide can only be used legally according to the directions on the label that is included at the time of the sale of the pesticide. The purpose of the label is "to provide clear directions for effective product performance while minimizing risks to human health and the environment". A label is a legally binding document that mandates how the pesticide can and must be used and failure to follow the label as written when using the pesticide is a federal offense. Within the European Union, a 2-tiered approach is used for the approval and authorisation of pesticides. Firstly, before a formulated product can be developed for market, the active substance must be approved for the European Union. After this has been achieved, authorisation for the specific product must be sought from every Member State that the applicant wants to sell it to. Afterwards, there is a monitoring programme to make sure the pesticide residues in food are below the limits set by the European Food Safety Authority. Although diquat was used in many European countries from the 1960s, an EU directive has removed its approval for any use, effective from 12 October 2018.

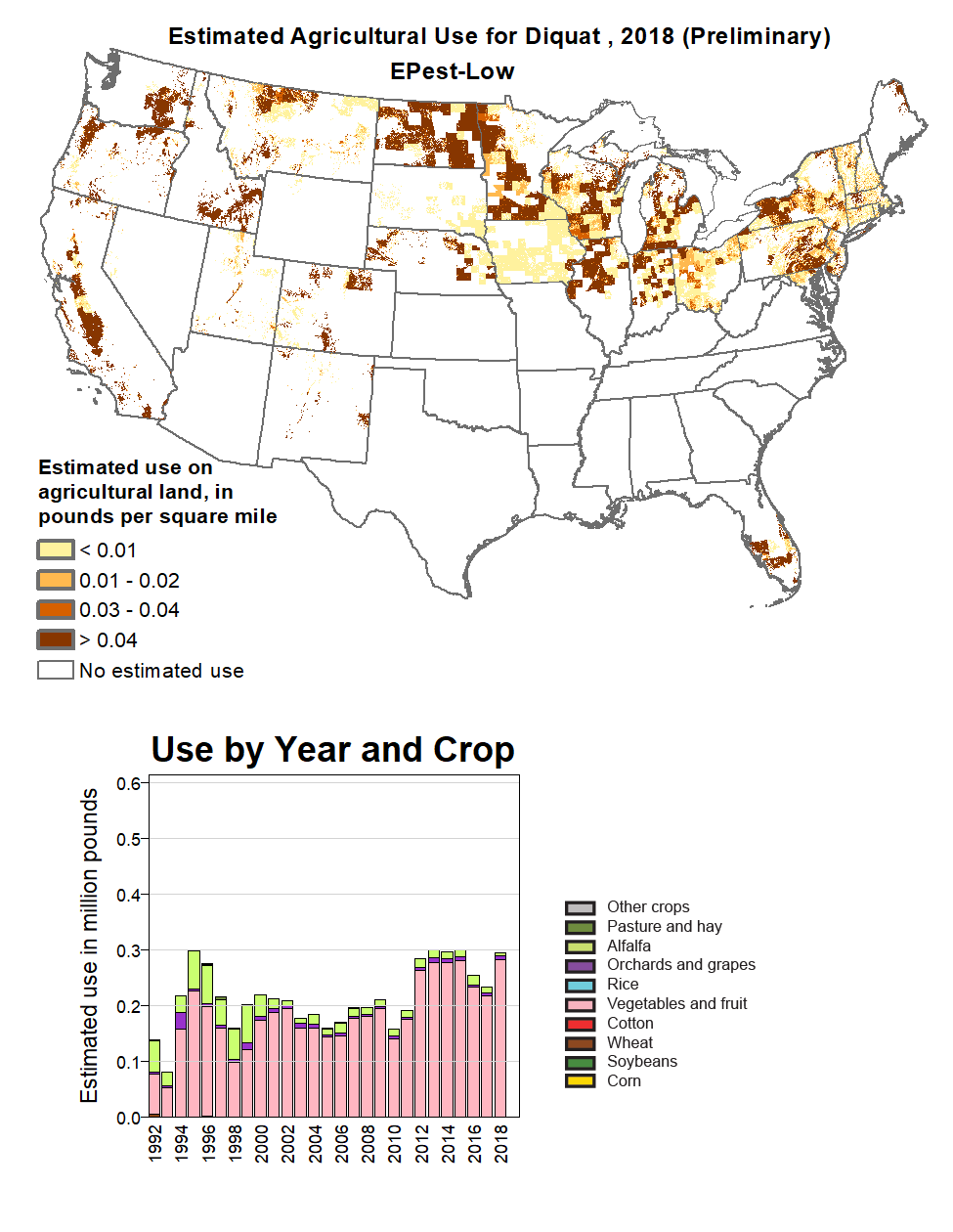
Diquat use in USA to 2018 (estimated by USGS)

Diquat is an unusual herbicide because it is often not used for weed control but is instead applied directly on mature crops. This causes desiccation, making the crop easier to harvest, particularly with mechanised equipment. The advantage to the farmer can be to advance the harvesting date, reduce the time taken to harvest and, in the case of seed crops, reduce the moisture content of the seed and increase its useful yield. Farmers can act in their best economic interest: the value of these benefits can be estimated and the total cost of using the herbicide, including the cost, for example of aerial spraying, informs the decision to purchase. This cost-benefit analysis by the end user sets a maximum price which the supplier can demand. When used as a conventional herbicide for weed control, diquat must be applied after the weeds have emerged since it is only effective on contact with green tissue. In this use it is fast-acting in sunlight and more effective on broadleaved weeds than grasses. Mixing of diquat with other herbicides is also feasible. The estimated annual use of diquat in US agriculture is mapped by the US Geological Survey. This shows that use is fairly stable and in 2018, the latest date for which figures are available, was about 300,000 pounds (140,000 kg) annually, almost exclusively in fruit and vegetable crops.

Beyond agriculture, diquat is also used to control invasive species such as submerged aquatic vegetation in the California Delta. Because California public drinking water is drawn through the delta as part of the California State Water Project, trace amounts of this pesticide are in much of the state's water supply.

Australia

Diquat is used in Australia, and the APVMA, circa 2026, decided to continue the use of it and paraquat, but cut the maximum permitted to spray on crops down from 1,150 g/Ha to 231 g/Ha, although spot-spraying techniques are excepted from that.

== Human safety ==
Diquat dibromide is moderately toxic. It may be harmful to humans if swallowed, inhaled, or absorbed through the skin in large quantities. Swallowed doses of 10ml and above are often lethal. Its chronic neurotoxic effects have been investigated. First aid measures are included with the label information.

The World Health Organization (WHO) and Food and Agriculture Organization (FAO) joint meeting on pesticide residues has determined that the acceptable daily intake for diquat (as its ion) is 0-0.006 mg/kg bodyweight per day, with an acute reference dose of 0.8 mg/kg bodyweight. The Codex Alimentarius database maintained by the FAO lists the maximum residue limits for diquat in various food products.

== Effects on the environment ==
Diquat bonds strongly to mineral and organic particles in soil and water, where it remains without significant degradation for years. However, bound to clays, diquat is biologically inactive at the concentrations typically observed in agricultural soils.

== Brands ==
By international convention and in many countries the law, pesticide labels are required to include the common name of the active ingredients. These names are not the exclusive property of the holder of any patent or trademark and as such they are the easiest way for non-experts to refer to individual chemicals. Companies selling pesticides normally do so using a brand name or wordmark which allows them to distinguish their product from competitor products having the same active ingredient. In many cases, this branding is country and formulation-specific so after several years of sales there can be multiple brand names for a given active ingredient. The situation is made even more complicated when companies license their ingredients to others, as is often done. The licensee will normally wish to create their own set of trademarks for use in advertising and to promote to their customers. In addition, they may intend to mix the licensed product with their own proprietary materials and would certainly create a new brand for these mixtures. It is therefore difficult to provide a comprehensive list of brand names for products containing diquat in its many salt and ester forms. The original ICI brand was Reglone and this name is still used by Syngenta. Other names include Aquacide, Dextrone, Preeglone, Deiquat, Spectracide, Detrone, Tribune and Weedtrine-D.

== See also ==
- Paraquat
