= Lewis (surname) =

- Pronunciation: Lewis

Origin
- Origin: several origins
- Region of origin: Wales, England, Scotland

Other names
- Variant forms: Lewes, Louis, Luis

Lewis is a surname in the English language. It has several independent origins.

One of the origins of the surname, in England and Wales, is from the Norman personal name Lowis, Lodovicus. This name is from the post-Classical Latin name Ludovicus, the Latinized form of the Germanic name Hlūtwīg, meaning "famed battle" (hlūt meaning "loud" or "famous" and wīg meaning "battle"). The name developed into the Old French Clovis, Clouis, and Louis. The name Lowis spread to England through the Normans.

In the United Kingdom, Lewis is most commonly associated with Wales, and is a common Welsh patronym. The name developed as an Anglicised or diminutive form of native Welsh names such as Llywelyn. Among the earliest examples being the Lewis family of Glamorgan in the 1540s. Other derivations include the Gaelic surname Mac Lughaidh, meaning "son of Lughaidh", which has also been Anglicised as Lewis. The surname Lewis is also an Anglicisation of several like-sounding Jewish surnames, such as Levy or Levi, or Los, Łoś, and of the Arab form of the name Elias.

In 2014, Lewis was the fourth most common surname in Saint Vincent and the Grenadines, sixth most common surname in Wales, 16th most common in Jamaica, 22nd most common in England, 24th most common in the United States, 61st most common in Canada and 129th most common in Scotland.

== Real people ==
=== Business ===
- Aylwin Lewis (born 1954), American CEO
- Dewi Lewis (born 1951), Welsh publisher and photographer
- Essington Lewis (1881–1961), Australian businessman
- J. Slater Lewis (1852–1901), English executive
- Jeremy Lewis (born 1969), American businessman
- Ken Lewis (born 1947), head of Bank of America
- Marianne W. Lewis, American academic, former dean of the Cass Business School
- Mary Jane Lewis (1852–1941), New Zealand brewery manager
- Peter B. Lewis (1933–2013), American businessman
- Reginald Lewis (1942–1993), American businessman
- Robert Benjamin Lewis (1802–1858), African-American entrepreneur
- Sage Frederick Lewis (born 1971), American homelessness activist, author, and small business owner
- Simon Lewis (born 1959), British political consultant, communications advisor, chief executive
- Will Lewis (born 1969), British media executive

=== Economics ===
- Joe Lewis (British businessman) (born 1937), wealthy English investor
- Martin Lewis (financial journalist) (born 1972), English money expert
- Tracy R. Lewis, American economist
- W. Arthur Lewis (1915–1991), St Lucian economist, winner of the Bank of Sweden Prize 1979

=== Law ===
- Bayan Lewis (born 1942), Los Angeles police chief
- Sir George Lewis, 1st Baronet (1833–1911), English lawyer of Jewish extraction
- James W. Lewis, American convicted in relation to the 1982 Tylenol scare
- Johnnie Lewis (1946–2015), Liberian judge
- R. Fred Lewis (born 1947), American judge
- Seth Lewis (1764–1848), American lawyer and judge
- Terry Lewis (Queensland) (1928–2023), Queensland police commissioner
- Theodore G. Lewis (1890–1934), American judge
- Virginia Emerson Lewis (died 1984), American political scientist and legal scholar
- William Draper Lewis (1867–1949), American legal scholar

=== Literature ===
- Alfred Henry Lewis (1855–1914), editor of Chicago Times and author
- Alun Lewis (1915–1944), poet of the Anglo-Welsh school
- Anthony Lewis (1927–2013), American writer
- Beverly Lewis (born 1949), American Christian fiction novelist and children's author
- C. S. Lewis (1898–1963), British academic and writer
- Cecil Day-Lewis (1904–1972), Irish poet
- Charles Lewis (journalist) (born 1953), American founder of the Center for Public Integrity
- D. B. Wyndham-Lewis (1891–1969), British columnist and literary editor
- Edna Lewis (1916–2006), American cook and writer
- Edward Gardner Lewis (1869–1950), American publisher
- Eiluned Lewis (1900–1979), Welsh writer
- Esther Lewis (poet) (1716–1794), English poet
- Hilda Lewis (1896–1974), British writer
- Janet Lewis (1899–1998), American writer
- Janet Cook Lewis (1855–1947), American librarian and book repairer
- Linda Lewis (author), British author
- Matthew Gregory Lewis (1775–1818), British Gothic novelist
- Michael Lewis (born 1960), American non-fiction author
- Miles Marshall Lewis (born 1970), American writer
- Naomi Lewis (1911–2009), British poet and children's writer
- Richard W. Lewis (1917–2002), American literary critic and biographer
- Roger Lewis (biographer) (born 1960), British biographer
- Rose Mabel Lewis (1853–1928), Welsh writer and suffragist
- Saunders Lewis (1893–1985), Welsh writer
- Sinclair Lewis (1885–1951), American novelist
- Ted Lewis (writer) (1940–1982), English crime novelist
- Titus Lewis (1773–1811), Welsh Calvinist and writer
- Warren Lewis (1895–1973), brother of C. S. Lewis
- Wendy Lewis (born 1962), Australian author
- Wyndham Lewis (1882–1957), American-British modernist artist and writer

=== Military ===
- Andrew Lewis (soldier) (1720–1781), Virginia general
- Andrew Lloyd Lewis (born 1963), American admiral
- Cecil Arthur Lewis (1898–1997), British military aviator
- Gwilym Hugh Lewis (1897–1996), British military aviator
- Isaac Newton Lewis (1858–1931), American soldier and inventor of the Lewis Gun
- Jack H. Lewis, United States Navy submarine commander in World War II
- Joseph Horace Lewis (1824–1904), Confederate Brigadier General
- Michael Lewis (naval historian) (1890–1970), Professor at the Royal Naval College, Greenwich
- Milton Lewis (1920–1942), United States Marine Corps recipient of the Navy Cross
- Robert A. Lewis (1917–1983), co-pilot on the Enola Gay that dropped the atomic bomb on Hiroshima
- Robert Patrick Lewis, former Green Beret and 1st Amendment Praetorian co-founder
- Thomas Lewis (RAF officer) (1894–1961), British aviator
- William Gaston Lewis (1835–1901), Confederate General

=== Modelling ===
- Ananda Lewis (1973–2025), American model
- Damaris Lewis (born 1990), American model/dancer
- Denice D. Lewis (born 1960), American model and actor
- Donny Lewis (born 1976), American model
- Nancy Lewis (bodybuilder), American female bodybuilder

=== Music ===
- Aaron Lewis (born 1972), American singer
- Andrew Lewis (composer) (born 1963), English composer of acousmatic music
- Andy Lewis (bassist) (1966–2000), Australian musician
- Ann Lewis (born 1956), Japanese singer
- Archie Lewis (1918–1988), Jamaican singer
- Barbara Lewis (born 1943), American singer
- Blake Lewis (born 1981), Season six on American Idol
- Bob Lewis (musician) (born 1947), musician
- Bobby Lewis (1925–2020), American R&B singer
- Charles D. Lewis (born 1955), Barbadian bassist, singer-songwriter, producer
- Courtney Lewis (conductor) (born 1984), British conductor
- C.J. Lewis (born 1967) British reggae singer
- Donna Lewis (born 1973), Welsh singer-songwriter
- Edward Lewis (Decca) (1900–1980), founder of Decca Records
- Edythe Lewis (1924–2014), American DJ and politician
- Ephraim Lewis (1967–1994), English soul and R&B singer and songwriter
- Furry Lewis (1893–1981), American blues guitarist
- Gary Lewis (musician) (born 1945), American musician
- George Lewis (clarinetist) (1900–1968), New Orleans jazz musician
- George E. Lewis (born 1952), jazz trombone player and composer
- Glenn Lewis (born 1975), Canadian singer
- Herbie Lewis (musician) (1941–2007), American jazz bassist
- Huey Lewis (born 1950), American musician and singer
- Jayce Lewis (born 1984), Welsh Musician/Solo Artist
- Jeannie Lewis (born 1945), Australian musician
- Jeffrey Lewis (born 1975), American singer/songwriter
- Jenny Lewis (born 1976 or 1977), American singer
- Jerry Lee Lewis (1935–2022), American rock and roll singer, songwriter, and pianist
- John Lewis (pianist) (1920–2001), the jazz pianist
- Jon Peter Lewis (born 1979), American singer
- Jona Lewie (born 1947), English singer
- Josh Lewis (guitarist) (born 1967), American guitarist
- Laurie Lewis (born 1950), American bluegrass musician
- Leona Lewis (born 1985), English singer
- Linda Lewis (1950–2023), British singer
- Linda Gail Lewis (born 1947), American musician
- Lori Lewis (born 1972), American opera singer
- Mary Lewis (soprano) (1900–1941), American soprano and actress
- Meade Lux Lewis (1905–1964), American pianist and composer
- Mel Lewis (1929–1990), American jazz drummer
- Mike Lewis (musician) (born 1977), Welsh guitarist for Lostprophets
- Mingo Lewis (1953–2026), American percussionist and drummer
- Morgan Lewis (songwriter) (1906–1968), American songwriter
- Noah Lewis (1891–1961), American jug band musician
- Oliver Lewis (violinist) (born 1971), British violinist
- Olivia Lewis (born 1978), Maltese singer
- Peter Scott Lewis (born 1953), American composer
- Phil Lewis (born 1957), English-American singer
- Ramsey Lewis (1935–2022), American jazz pianist and composer
- Ray Lewis (singer), singer for The Drifters
- Richard Lewis (tenor) (1914–1990), English tenor
- Richard Lewis (musician), American musician and member of Beatles tributes The Fab Four and Liverpool Legends
- Ryan Lewis (born 1988), American musician and producer, frequent collaborator with Macklemore and part of Macklemore & Ryan Lewis
- Sarah-Jane Lewis (born 1987), English soprano
- Shaznay Lewis (born 1975), English singer-songwriter
- Smiley Lewis (1913–1966), musician
- Steve Lewis (musician) (1896 – c. 1941), American jazz pianist
- Ted Lewis (musician) (1890–1971), American band leader
- Terence Lewis (choreographer) (born 1975), Indian dancer and choreographer
- Tom Lewis (songwriter) (born 1943), Canadian folksinger/songwriter
- Yvonne John Lewis, English singer

=== Philosophy ===
- Clarence Irving Lewis (1883–1964), philosopher and mathematical logician
- David Lewis (philosopher) (1941–2001), American philosopher
- Hywel David Lewis (1910–1992), Welsh philosopher and theologian
- Michael Lewis (philosopher) (born 1977), British philosopher

=== Politics ===
- Andrew L. Lewis Jr. (1931–2016), American politician
- Ann Lewis (born 1937), American political advisor
- Anna Lewis (suffragette) (1899–1976), British suffragette, recipient of Hunger Strike Medal
- Arthur Lewis (English politician) (1917–1998), MP for Newham, North West
- Arthur Morrow Lewis (1873–1922, American socialist and rationalist lecturer and writer
- Avi Lewis (born May 1968), Canadian television journalist, documentary filmmaker, and politician, son of Stephen Lewis, grandson of David Lewis, great-grandson of Morris Lewis
- B. Robert Lewis (1931–1979), American veterinarian and politician
- Burton B. Lewis (1856–1938), American cheese manufacturer and politician
- Clive Derby-Lewis (1936–2016), South African politician
- Daurene Lewis (1943–2013), Canadian politician
- David Lewis (Canadian politician) (1909–1981), Russian-born Canadian lawyer and politician
- David P. Lewis (1820–1884), American politician
- David R. Lewis (born 1971), American politician
- Delano Lewis (1938–2023), American attorney, businessman and diplomat
- Dixon Hall Lewis (1802–1848), American politician
- Doug Lewis (born 1938), Canadian politician
- Drew Lewis (1931–2016) American, U.S. Secretary of Transportation
- Edmund H. Lewis (1884–1972), Chief Judge of the NY Court of Appeals 1953–1954
- Elliott Lewis (politician) (1858–1935), Australian politician
- Elisha Lewis (died 1867), American politician
- Eugene Lewis (c. 1940–2024), American political scientist
- Evan Lewis (politician) (1869–1941), American politician
- Fielding Lewis (1725–1781), brother-in-law of George Washington
- Francis Lewis (1713–1802), American merchant and politician
- Fred E. Lewis (1865–1949), US Congressman from Pennsylvania and Mayor of Allentown, Pennsylvania
- Geordin Hill-Lewis (born 1986), South African politician, mayor of Cape Town
- George Cornewall Lewis (1806–1863), British statesman
- J. Hamilton Lewis (1863–1939), American politician
- Helmar Lewis (1900–1999), American politician
- Herbert Lewis (politician) (1858–1933), British politician
- Ivan Lewis (born 1967), British politician
- James A. Lewis (politician) (1933–1997), American libertarian politician
- James T. Lewis (1819–1904), politician
- Jerry Lewis (California politician) (1934–2021), American politician
- Joan Lewis, American politician
- John Lewis (1844–1923), Australian pastoralist and politician
- John Lewis (1940–2020), American civil rights activist and politician
- John Bower Lewis (1817–1874), Canadian politician
- John F. Lewis (1818–1895), American farmer and politician
- John Wood Lewis Sr. (1801–1865), American politician
- Joseph J. Lewis (1801–1883), American Commissioner of Internal Revenue
- JT Lewis (born 2000), American political candidate
- Julian Lewis (born 1951), British politician
- Kate Lewis, Grenadian politician
- Kenneth Lewis (politician) (1916–1997), British politician
- Kimmi Lewis (1957–2019), American politician
- Leslyn Lewis (born 1970), Canadian politician
- Loran L. Lewis (1825–1916), New York politician and judge
- Louie E. Lewis (1893–1968), Illinois politician
- Marilyn Lewis (1931–2020), American politician
- Mary Parker Lewis, American political consultant and activist
- Merton E. Lewis (1861–1937), NY State Attorney General 1917–1918
- Michael "Mike" Lewis, (born 1970), Vice-Mayor, Franklin Town Council, Franklin, N.C. (2019 to present)
- Morgan Lewis (governor) (1754–1844), Governor of New York State
- Morris Lewis (born Mojżesz Łoś, sometimes known as Moishe Lewis, 1888–1950), Polish-Jewish labour activist in eastern Europe and Canada
- Mungo Lewis (1894–1969), Canadian politician
- Oswald Lewis (1887–1966), British businessman, barrister and politician
- Patti Lewis, American politician
- Peter Lewis (politician) (1942–2017), Australian politician
- Richard Lewis (New Zealand politician) (born 1969), New Zealand politician
- Ron Lewis (born 1946), American politician
- Sandy Lewis (1931–2016), Australian politician
- J. E. Stanley Lewis (1888–1970), Canadian politician
- Stephen Lewis (1937–2026), Canadian politician and diplomat, son of David Lewis (politician)
- Terry Lewis (politician) (born 1935), British politician
- Thomas Lewis (NSW) (1922–2016), Australian politician
- Thomas Lewis Jr. (1760–1847), U.S. Congressman from Virginia
- Tommy Lewis (trade unionist) (1873–1962), British trade unionist and Labour MP
- Vaughan Lewis (born 1940), St. Lucian politician
- William Berkeley Lewis (1784–1866), American politician
- William Mather Lewis (1878–1945), American teacher, university president, local politician, and a state and national government official.

=== Religion ===
- Christopher Andrew Lewis (born 1944), British academic and clergyman
- Saint David Lewis (1616–1679), one of the Forty Martyrs of England and Wales
- David Lewis (1839–1901), Anglican priest and Archdeacon of Carmarthen
- Edwin Lewis (1881–1959), American Methodist theologian
- Esther Lewis (missionary) (1887–1958), Welsh missionary
- Harvey Spencer Lewis (1883–1939), American Rosicrucian
- John Lewis (philosopher) (1889–1976), British philosopher and religious leader
- Joseph Lewis (freethinker) (1889–1968), freethinker and atheist
- Oswald Lewis (bishop) (born 1944), Indian Roman Catholic bishop
- Ralph Maxwell Lewis (1904–1987), American Rosicrucian
- Row Lewis, Grenadian Director of the Liberty Fellowship Center
- Ruth Lewis (died 2020), Pakistani Roman Catholic nun
- Sharma Lewis, African American United Methodist bishop

=== Science ===
- Adrian Lewis (mathematician) (born 1962), British-Canadian mathematician
- Bennett Lewis (1908–1987), Canadian physicist
- Bunnell Lewis (1824–1908), English archaeologist
- Carenza Lewis (born 1963), archaeologist
- Edward B. Lewis (1918–2004), American geneticist
- George W. Lewis (1882–1948), director of NACA
- Georgina King Lewis (1847–1924), English philanthropist
- Gilbert N. Lewis (1875–1946), American physical chemist
- Glyn Lewis, British professor of psychiatric epidemiology
- Graceanna Lewis (1821–1912), American naturalist and anti-slavery activist
- Gwilym Peter Lewis (born 1952), British botanist
- Harlan Lewis (1919–2008), American botanist
- Henry Carvill Lewis (1853–1888), American geologist
- Ioan Lewis (1930–2014), Scottish anthropologist and academic
- Jack Lewis, Baron Lewis of Newnham (1928–2014), English chemist
- John S. Lewis (born 1941), American professor of planetary science at the University of Arizona
- Jonathan Lewis (oncologist), biomedical researcher, cancer drug developer
- Margaret Reed Lewis (1881–1970), American cell biologist and embryologist
- Marion Lewis (1925–2025), Canadian medical researcher and professor of medicine
- Paul A. Lewis (1879–1929), American pathologist
- Stephen J. Lewis, British gastroenterologist; development of the Bristol Stool Chart
- Trevor Lewis (entomologist) (born 1933), British entomologist
- Warren Harmon Lewis (1870–1964), American cell biologist and embryologist

=== Sports ===
- Lewis (baseball), baseball player
- Adrian Lewis (born 1985), English darts player
- Ady Lewis (born 1975), English boxer who fought in the 1990s and 2000s
- Alan Lewis (born 1964), Irish cricketer and rugby union referee
- Allan Lewis (baseball) (born 1941), Panamanian professional baseball player
- Andrew Lewis (racing driver) (born 1987), American racing driver
- Ashton Lewis Jr. (born 1972), American driver
- Becky Lewis (born 1983 or 1984), British long-distance swimmer
- Bernie Lewis (born 1945), Welsh footballer
- Bill Lewis (football) (born 1941), American football coach
- Billy Lewis (footballer, born 1864) (1864–1935), Welsh international footballer
- Brad Alan Lewis (born 1954), American rower
- Brian M. Lewis (born 1974), American athlete
- Bryn Lewis (1891–1917), Wales international rugby union footballer
- Cam Lewis (born 1997), American football player
- Carl Lewis (born 1961), American Olympic athlete
- Cary B. Lewis (1888–1946), African American sportswriter
- Chad Lewis (born 1971), American football player
- Chavaughn Lewis (born 1993), American basketball player for Hapoel Galil Elyon of the Israeli Basketball Premier League
- Charles Lewis (footballer) (1886–1967), English football player
- Chris Lewis (cricketer) (born 1968), England international and county cricketer
- Claude Lewis (1908–1993), English cricketer
- Chris Lewis (tennis player) (born 1957), New Zealand tennis player
- Colby Lewis (born 1979), American baseball player
- Corey Lewis (racing driver) (born 1991), American racing driver
- Cory Lewis (born 2000), American baseball player
- D. D. Lewis (1970s linebacker) (1945–2025), American football player
- D. D. Lewis (2000s linebacker) (born 1979), American football player
- Dai Lewis (1866–1943), Wales international rugby union footballer
- Dale Lewis (footballer) (born 1969), Australian rules footballer
- Dan Lewis (footballer) (1902–1965), Welsh football player
- Daniel Lewis (volleyball) (born 1976), Canadian volleyball player
- Darren Lewis (born 1967), American baseball player
- Darryl Lewis (born 1961), American football player
- Darryll Lewis (born 1968), American football player
- Dave Lewis (linebacker) (1954–2020), National Football League linebacker
- Dave Lewis (hockey) (born 1953), Canadian hockey coach
- Denise Lewis (born 1972), British heptathlete
- Desmond Lewis (1946–2018), Jamaican cricketer
- Donnie Lewis (born 1997), American football player
- Dudley Lewis (1962–2025), Welsh football player.
- Duffy Lewis (1888–1979), American baseball player
- Ed Lewis (wrestler) (1891–1966), American wrestler
- Eddie Lewis (American soccer) (born 1974), American football (soccer) player
- Eddie Lewis (English footballer) (1935–2011), English football (soccer) player
- Edward John Lewis (1859–1925), Wales international rugby union footballer
- Eldece Clarke-Lewis (born 1965), Bahamian runner
- Evin Lewis (born 1991), Trinidadian cricketer
- Fred Lewis (born 1980), American baseball player
- Fred Lewis (handball) (born 1947), American handball player
- Geno Lewis (born 1993), American (college) football player
- Geoff Lewis (1935–2025), Welsh retired jockey
- George Lewis (rugby), rugby union and rugby league footballer of the 1920s and 1930s for Pontypool RFC (RU), for Wales (RL), and St. Helens
- George Lewis (rugby league), rugby league footballer of the 1920s, 1930s and 1940s for Castleford
- Grant Lewis (born 1985), American NHL ice hockey player
- Greg Lewis (wide receiver) (born 1980), American football player
- Guy Lewis (1922–2015), American basketball coach
- Harry Lewis (boxer) (1886–1956), American boxer
- Haydn Lewis (born 1986), Barbadian tennis player
- Hayley Lewis (born 1974), Australian swimmer
- Herbie Lewis (ice hockey) (1906–1991), Canadian hockey player
- Jackie Lewis (born 1936), British racing driver
- Jamal Lewis (American football) (born 1979), American football player
- Jamal Lewis (footballer) (born 1998), Northern Irish footballer
- Jamie Lewis (darts player) (born 1991), Welsh darts player
- Jensen Lewis (born 1984), American baseball player
- Jim Lewis (racehorse owner), owner of racehorse Best Mate
- Jim Lewis (1980s pitcher) (born 1955), American baseball player
- Jimi Lewis (born 1974), English hockey player
- Joe Lewis (footballer) (born 1987), English footballer
- Joe Lewis (1944–2012), American martial artist and actor
- John Henry Lewis (1914–1974), American boxer
- Jon Lewis (born 1975), English cricketer
- Jonathan Lewis (soccer) (born 1997), American soccer player
- Jourdan Lewis (born 1995), American football player
- Kahlil Lewis (born 1997), American football player
- Keontez Lewis (born 2003), American football player
- Kevin Lewis (defensive back) (born 1966), American defensive back
- Kevin Lewis (linebacker) (born 1978), American football linebacker
- Kip Lewis (born 2004), American football player
- Kira Lewis (born 2001), American basketball player
- Kirstin Jean Lewis (born 1975), South African archer
- Kobe Lewis (born 2000), American football player
- Kyle Lewis (born 1995), American baseball player
- Lennox Lewis (born 1965), English boxer
- Leo Lewis (1933–2013), American football player
- Lesa Lewis (born 1967), American IFBB professional bodybuilder
- Lionel Lewis (born 1982), Singaporean footballer
- Luke Lewis (born 1983), Australian rugby league player
- M. Lewis, Surrey cricketer
- Maia Lewis (born 1970), New Zealand cricketer
- Malique Lewis (born 2004), Trinidadian basketball player
- Marcedes Lewis (born 1984), American football player
- Mark Lewis (Arena Football League) (born 1979), American football player
- Mark Lewis (baseball) (born 1969), American baseball player
- Mark Lewis-Francis (born 1982), British athlete
- Martin Lewis (basketball) (born 1975), American basketball player
- Martyn Lewis (badminton) (born 1982), British badminton player
- Marvin Lewis (born 1958), American football coach
- Mick Lewis (born 1974), Australian cricketer
- Michael Lewis (safety) (born 1980), American Football player for the San Francisco 49ers
- Michael Lewis (wide receiver) (born 1971), American Football player for the New Orleans Saints
- Mo Lewis (born 1969), American football player
- Norman Lewis (fencer) (1915–2006), American Olympic fencer
- Oliver Lewis (1856–1924), American jockey
- Olivia Lewis (born 1999), Australian netballer
- Osia Lewis (1962–2020), American football player
- Oswald Lewis (cricketer) (1833–1895), Australian cricketer
- Panama Lewis (1945–2020), American boxing trainer
- Patrick Lewis (born 1991), American football player
- Paul Lewis (born 1966), Australian field hockey player
- Paul Lewis (born 1994), British association footballer
- Paul Lewis (1932–2025), American NASCAR driver
- Percy "Plum" Lewis (1884–1976), South African cricketer
- Percy Lewis (1864–1922), Australian cricketer
- Percy Lewis (1927–2019), Trinidad and Tobago/British boxer who fought in the 1950s and 1960s
- Peyton Lewis (born 2005), American football player
- Rashard Lewis (born 1979), American basketball player
- Rawl Lewis (born 1974), Grenadian cricketer
- Ray Lewis (American football) (born 1975), American football player
- Ray Lewis (runner) (1910–2003), Canadian athlete
- Rico Lewis (born 2004), English footballer
- Reg Lewis (1920–1997), English footballer
- Reggie Lewis (1965–1993), American basketball player
- Reginald Lewis (cricketer) (1927–1981), South African cricketer
- Ricky Lewis (born 1982), American soccer player
- Robert B. Lewis (1924–2006), Thoroughbred racehorse owner
- Roderick Lewis (born 1971), American football player
- Royce Lewis (born 1999), American baseball player
- Scott Lewis (left-handed pitcher) (born 1983), American baseball player
- Sian Lewis (born 1976), British pentathlete
- Stacy Lewis (born 1985), American golfer
- Steve Lewis (athlete) (born 1969), American athlete
- Stuart Lewis-Evans (1930–1958), British Formula One driver
- Tamsyn Lewis (born 1978), Australian athlete
- Ted "Kid" Lewis (Gershon Mendeloff) (1893–1970), English world champion Hall of Fame welterweight boxer
- Thomas Lewis (football) (born 1972), American football wide receiver in the NFL
- Tim Lewis (born 1961), American football player
- Thyron Lewis (born 1982), American football player
- Tommylee Lewis (born 1992), American football player
- Tony Lewis (born 1938), Welsh cricketer
- Trevor Lewis (born 1987), American hockey player
- Trey Lewis (American football) (born 1985), American NFL defensive tackle
- Trey Lewis (basketball) (born 1992), American basketball player in the Israeli Basketball Premier League
- Tyquan Lewis (born 1995), American football player
- Vernon Lewis (American football) (born 1970), American football player
- Vernon Lewis (footballer) (1881–1941), English footballer
- Wally Lewis (born 1959), Australian rugby league player
- Wilf Lewis (1903–1976), Welsh international footballer
- Yvette Lewis (athlete) (born 1985), Panamaian track and field athlete

=== Television and film ===
- Al Lewis (actor) (1923–2006), American actor
- Andrea Lewis (born 1985), Canadian actress
- Avi Lewis (born May 1968), Canadian television journalist, documentary filmmaker, and politician, son of Stephen Lewis, grandson of David Lewis, great-grandson of Morris Lewis
- Charlotte Lewis (born 1967), English actress
- Chauntal Lewis (born 1984), American actress
- Damian Lewis (born 1971), English actor
- Dan Lewis (newsreader) (born 1949), Seattle-based Newsreader
- Daniel Day-Lewis (born 1957), English actor
- David Lewis (actor) (1916–2000), American actor
- Dawnn Lewis (born 1961), American actress
- Diana Lewis (1919–1997), American Actress
- Emmanuel Lewis (born 1971), American actor
- Francine Lewis, a British actress, model, television presenter and impressionist
- Forrest Lewis (1899–1977), American actor
- Gary Lewis (actor) (born 1957), Scottish actor
- Geoffrey Lewis (actor) (1935–2015), American actor
- George Lewis (journalist) (born 1943), broadcast journalist at NBC News
- Harry Lewis (actor) (1920–2013), actor
- Herschell Gordon Lewis (1926–2016), American film director
- Howard Lew Lewis (1941–2018), English actor and comedian
- Ida Lewis (1842–1911), Canadian actress
- Indy Lewis (born 2001), British actress
- Jason Lewis (born 1971), American actor
- Jenifer Lewis (born 1957), American actress
- Jerry Lewis (1926–2017), American comedian, actor, screenwriter, and director
- Johnny Lewis (1983–2012), American actor
- Joseph Lewis (1907–2000), American film director
- Judy Lewis (1935–2011), American actress
- Juliette Lewis (born 1973), American actress
- Leah Lewis (born 1996), American actress
- Martin Lewis (humorist) (born 1952), English humorist/producer/writer/TV host
- Martyn Lewis (journalist) (born 1945), British newsreader
- Mary Jane Lewis, married name of Mary Jane Croft (1916–1999), American actress
- Matthew Lewis (actor) (born 1989), English actor
- Mike Lewis (model) (born 1981), Indonesian actor and model
- Phill Lewis (born 1968), American actor
- Richard Lewis (comedian) (1947–2024), American comedian and actor
- Richard J. Lewis, TV and film director
- Robert Lewis (actor) (1909–1997), American actor
- Robert Q. Lewis (1920–1991), American actor and game show host
- Sharon Lewis, Canadian television personality
- Stephen Lewis (actor) (1926–2015), English actor
- Tamasin Day-Lewis (born 1953), English television chef
- Ted Lewis (voice actor), voice actor
- Terence Lewis (choreographer) (born 1975), Indian dancer and choreographer
- Vicki Lewis (born 1960), American actress
- Victor Lewis-Smith, British TV critic and humorist

=== Theater ===
- Shari Lewis (1933–1998), American puppeteer

=== Visual art ===
- Bill Lewis (born 1953), English artist
- Corey Lewis, American comics artist
- Edmonia Lewis (1844–1907), American sculptor
- Ivor Lewis (1882–1958), Canadian sculptor
- Martin Lewis (1881–1962), Australian artist
- Maud Lewis (1903–1970), Canadian artist
- Nate Lewis (born 1985), American artist
- Neville Lewis (1895–1972), South African artist
- Tau Lewis (born 1993), Canadian artist

=== Other ===
- Alice Marie Lewis (c. 1850–1933), British social reformer
- Anna Lewis (1885–1961), American historian
- Ashani Lewis (born 1998), British writer
- Bernard Lewis (1916–2018), English historian
- Christopher John Lewis, New Zealand assassin
- Damien Lewis (disambiguation), multiple people
- Don Lewis (born 1938), wealthy zookeeper who disappeared in 1997
- Doris E. Lewis (1911–1988), Canadian librarian
- Lady Davina Lewis (born 1977), minor British Royal
- Dorothy Otnow Lewis, American psychiatrist
- Dorothy Swain Lewis (1915–2013), American aviator
- Earl Lewis, American academic administrator
- Essington Lewis (1881–1961), Australian industrialist
- Esther Lewis (abolitionist) (1782–1848), Pennsylvania abolitionist and farmer
- Fulton Lewis (1903–1966), American radio broadcaster
- Geoffrey Lewis (scholar) (1920–2008), English professor of the Turkish language
- Henrietta Stakesby Lewis (1850–1912), South African temperance leader
- James Lewis (disambiguation), multiple people
- James Paul Lewis Jr., American Ponzi schemer
- Joel W. Lewis, American abolitionist and reformer
- Jonathan Lewis (2006–2023), student who was beaten to death by a group of students on campus
- John Lewis (Virginia colonist) (1678–1762), early settler in western Virginia
- John L. Lewis (1880–1969), American labor leader
- Justin Lewis (disambiguation), multiple people
- Levi Lewis (disambiguation), multiple people
- Lillian A. Lewis (1861–?), American journalist
- Mark Edward Lewis (born 1954), American historian of early China
- Meriwether Lewis (1774–1809), American explorer and co-leader of Lewis and Clark expedition
- Reina Lewis (born 1963), British art historian
- Richard D. Lewis (born 1930), British linguist and cross-cultural communication consultant
- Samuel L. Lewis (1896–1971), American Sufi and founder of Dances of Universal Peace
- Shirley A. R. Lewis (born 1937), American educator, academic administrator, college president
- Terrell Lewis (disambiguation), multiple people
- Thomas Lewis (Virginia politician) (1718–1790), American surveyor
- Thomas Lewis (unionist) (1866–1939), president, United Mine Workers of America
- Tom Lewis (M.D.) (1918–2004), English obstetrician
- William Lewis (chess player) (1787–1870), English chess player of the 19th century

== Fictional characters ==
- Alphie Lewis, fictional character from House of Anubis
- Charlotte Lewis (Lost), fictional character from Lost
- Cliff Lewis, fictional character from Matlock
- Gareth Lewis, a fictional character from the British soap opera Doctors
- Jerry Lewis, a fictional character from the animated television series Totally Spies
- Josh and Reva Lewis, fictional characters from Guiding Light
- Luke Lewis, fictional character from music business Universal
- Melissa Lewis, fictional character from The Martian
- Marisol Lewis, from Degrassi
- Meldrick Lewis, from Homicide: Life on the Street
- Robbie Lewis, fictional character in Inspector Morse and Inspector Lewis
- Shelley Lewis, fictional character from EastEnders
- Susan Lewis (ER), fictional character from ER
- Tara Lewis, protagonist of Criminal Minds
- Tony Lewis, fictional character from The Tenth Kingdom
- Vanessa Lewis, fictional character from Virtua Fighter

== See also ==
- Lewis (given name)
- Lewis (disambiguation)
