= Mary Lewis =

Mary Lewis may refer to:

== Arts and entertainment ==
- Mary Lewis (Canadian actress), Canadian actress and filmmaker from Newfoundland
- Mary Lewis (soprano) (1900–1941), American soprano and actress
- Mary Edmonia Lewis (1844–1907), American sculptor
- Mary Jeffreys Lewis (1852–1926), British-born American actress

== Government and politics ==
- Mary Anne Lewis, Viscountess Beaconsfield, wife of Disraeli
- Mary Geiger Lewis (born 1958), United States district judge
- Mary Parker Lewis, political consultant

== Science and academics ==
- Mary Lewis (archaeologist), British professor of archaeology
- Mary Butler Lewis (1903–1970), American anthropologist
- Mary D. Lewis, professor of French history
- Mary S. Lewis (1934–2017), American musicologist

== Other people ==
- Mary Lewis Nicotera, American judoka

== See also ==
- Lewis (surname)
- Mary Jane Lewis (disambiguation), various people
