= Jeremy Lewis =

Jeremy Lewis may refer to:

- Jeremy Lewis (American businessman), president and CEO of Big Fish Games
- Jeremy Lewis (gridiron football), American football player in the Canadian Football League
- Jeremy J. Lewis, British businessman, founded the Amazon Recording Studios in Liverpool

== See also ==
- Jerry Lewis (disambiguation)
