= Frank Winter (disambiguation) =

Frank Winter (1906–1976) was a New Zealand Māori leader.

Frank Winter may also refer to:

- Frank H. Winter (born 1942), British-born American rocketry historian and writer

== See also ==
- Frank Winters (born 1964), American football player
