= Jerry Lee Lewis (disambiguation) =

Jerry Lee Lewis (1935–2022) was an American musician.

Jerry Lee Lewis may also refer to:

- Jerry Lee Lewis (1958 album), his debut album
- Jerry Lee Lewis (1979 album)
- Jerry Lee Lewis: Trouble in Mind, a 2022 documentary

== See also ==
- Jerry Lewis (disambiguation)
