= Jimmy Lewis =

Jimmy Lewis may refer to:

- Jimmy Lewis (musician) (1937–2004), American soul musician
- Jimmy Lewis (bassist) (1918–2000), American jazz, R&B and soul bass player
- Jimmy Lewis (lacrosse), American lacrosse player
- Jimmy Lewis (cricketer) (born 1962), former English cricketer
- Jimmy Lewis (surfer), American surfer and windsurfer
- Jimmy Lewis (musician), (born 1982), Australian musician/audio engineer
- James "Jimmy" Lewis, fictional character from video game Rage of the Dragons

== See also ==
- Jim Lewis (disambiguation)
- James Lewis (disambiguation)
