= James Lewis =

James Lewis may refer to:

== Politicians ==
- J. Hamilton Lewis (1863–1939), United States senator
- James Lewis (Indiana politician) (1930–2016), Democratic member of the Indiana Senate
- James Lewis (Louisiana politician) (1832–1914), Louisiana soldier and politician
- James A. Lewis (politician) (1933–1997), United States Libertarian Party 1984 vice-presidential candidate
- James B. Lewis (born 1947), state treasurer of New Mexico
- James M. Lewis (1943–2022), American pharmacist and Tennessee state senator
- James R. Lewis (legislator) (1936–2020), Wisconsin Republican state representative
- James T. Lewis (1819–1904), Governor of Wisconsin, 1864–1866
- James Lewis (MP for Cardiganshire) (1601–?), Welsh politician who sat in the House of Commons at various times between 1624 and 1656
- James Lewis (Canadian politician) (1854–1929), member of the Legislative Assembly of New Brunswick

== Lawyers ==
- James Lewis (judge) (born 1958), Chief Justice of the Falkland Islands and the British Indian Ocean Territory
- James A. Lewis (attorney) (born 1940), United States Attorney in Illinois
- James F. Lewis (1836–1886), justice of the Supreme Court of Nevada
- James Woodrow Lewis (1912–1999), chief justice on the South Carolina Supreme Court

== Others ==
- James Lewis (American football) (born 1978), American football defensive back
- James Lewis (actor) (1840–1896), American comic actor
- James Lewis (rugby union) (born 1987), Welsh rugby union footballer
- Flex Lewis (James Lewis, born 1983), Welsh bodybuilder
- James Lewis (CIA officer) (1944–1983), CIA agent killed in the 1983 United States embassy bombing
- James Paul Lewis Jr., operated one of the largest and longest running "Ponzi schemes" in United States history
- James R. Lewis (scholar) (1949–2022), professional writer and academic specializing in new religious movements and New Age
- James Andrew Lewis (born 1953), American security specialist
- James W. Lewis, American convicted for extortion in relation to the 1982 Chicago Tylenol murders
- James Otto Lewis (1799–1858), American engraver and painter
- James E. Lewis (1923–1997), African-American artist, art collector and curator
- Charles Masson (James Lewis, 1800–1853), pseudonymous British soldier, explorer and archaeologist

== See also ==
- Jimmy Lewis (disambiguation)
- Jim Lewis (disambiguation)
- Lewis (surname)
