= E. B. Lewis =

E. B. Lewis is the name of:

- E. B. Lewis (illustrator), children's book illustrator and artist
- Edward B. Lewis, geneticist
- Elijah B. Lewis, U.S. Representative from Georgia

== See also ==
- Lewis (surname)
