= Mary Jane Lewis =

Mary Jane Lewis may refer to:

- Mary Jane Croft (1916–1999), American actress also known as Mary Jane Lewis
- Mary Jane Innes (1852–1941), New Zealand brewery manager with the maiden name Lewis

== See also ==
- Mary Lewis (disambiguation)
