= Jim Lewis =

Jim Lewis may refer to:

== Arts ==
- Jim Lewis (novelist) (born 1963), American novelist
- Jim Lewis (writer) (born 1955), Muppet writer

== Sports ==
- Jim Lewis (1930s pitcher), Negro leagues baseball player
- Jim Lewis (1980s pitcher) (born 1955), Minnesota Twins, Seattle Mariners, and New York Yankees pitcher
- Jim Lewis (1990s pitcher) (born 1964), San Diego Padres baseball pitcher
- Jim Lewis (basketball) (born 1946), WNBA head coach
- Jim Lewis (footballer, born 1909) (1909–1980), Welsh footballer who played for Watford during the 1930s and early 1940s
- Jim Lewis (footballer, born 1927) (1927–2011), English footballer who played for Chelsea during the 1950s
- Jim Lewis (Irish footballer) (1874–1957), international goalkeeper
- Jim Lewis (racehorse owner) (1934–2023), owner of Best Mate

== Others ==
- James Paul Lewis, Jr., perpetrator of one of the longest running Ponzi schemes in history
- Jim Lewis (astrologer) (1941–1995), American astrologer
- Jim Lewis (business executive) (born 1953), former president of Disney Vacation Club, now an executive with Wal*Mart Stores

== See also ==
- James Lewis (disambiguation)
- Lewis (surname)
