= Gary Lewis =

Gary Lewis may refer to:

- Gary Lewis (musician) (born 1945), son of Jerry Lewis and lead singer of Gary Lewis & the Playboys
- Gary Lewis (actor) (Gary Stevenson, born 1957), Scottish actor
- Gary Lewis (tight end) (born 1958), former American football player
- Gary Lewis (running back) (1942–1986), American football player
- Gary Lewis (defensive lineman) (born 1961), former American and Canadian football player
- Gary Lewis (outdoor writer) (born 1967), American writer
- Gary Lewis (sprinter) (born 1950), American sprinter, 1973 All-American for the Arizona State Sun Devils track and field team
- Gary Christie Lewis (born 1970), New Zealand carpenter, former husband of Lady Davina Windsor
- Garry Lewis (gridiron football) (born 1967), American football player
- Garry Lewis (soccer) (born 1986), American soccer player

== See also ==
- Gary Lewis & the Playboys, 1960s U.S. pop music band
- Jerry Lewis (disambiguation)
