= Esther Lewis =

Esther Lewis may refer to:

- Esther Lewis (missionary)
- Esther Lewis (poet)
- Esther Lewis (abolitionist)
