= Ron Scott (sports administrator) =

New Zealand sports administrator

Sir Ronald Stewart Scott (21 January 1928 – 7 August 2016) was a New Zealand sports administrator. He was the chairman of the organising committee for the 1974 Christchurch Commonwealth Games, and was Chef de Mission at the 1984 Olympic Games. In Wellington he helped establish the Westpac Stadium.

He attended Otago Boys' High School and the University of Otago, then was a radio broadcaster in Timaru and a manager for Illott's advertising agency in Auckland.

He served as chairman of the Hillary Commission, the forerunner to Sport New Zealand. Scott died in Upper Hutt on 7 August 2016, aged 88. His wife, Beverley Joan, Lady Scott, died in January 2019.

Scott was appointed a Knight Bachelor for services to sport, particularly the Commonwealth Games, in the 1974 Queen's Birthday Honours.
