= A Bashful Bigamist =

1921 film

- Directed by: Allen Watt
- Written by: Frank Roland Conklin
- Produced by: Vanity Comedies
- Starring: Billy Bletcher; Mary Lewis
- Cinematography: A. Lindsley Lane
- Release date: 1920 (U.S.)
- Country: United States

A Bashful Bigamist is a 1920 short silent film that was unknown and thought to be a lost film, but a copy was found in the New Zealand Film Archive in 2009. The film is currently viewable on the National Film Preservation Foundation website without a musical score.

== Sources ==
- New Zealand Academy of Motion Picture Arts
- National Film Preservation Foundation
