= Los (surname) =

Łoś (Polish) or Los (Czech, Slovak, Slovenian, etc., also transliterated from Belarusian, Ukrainian, and Russian "Лось") is a surname meaning "moose" or "elk" in most Slavic languages.

== People ==
- Jan Łoś (born 2000), Polish footballer
- Jerzy Łoś (1920–1998), Polish mathematician and logician
- Ludwik Łoś (1914–1995), Polish footballer
- Mojżesz Łoś, birth name of Morris Lewis (1888–1950), Polish-Jewish labour activist in eastern Europe and Canada
- Sergio Los (born 1934), Italian architect
- Stanisław Łoś (1890–1974), Polish historian, politician, diplomat, and publicist
- Urszula Łoś (born 1994), Polish racing cyclist

=== Fictional characters ===
- Comrade Los, character from the Soviet novel and film Alitet Leaves for the Hills
- Engineer Mstislav Los, character from the Soviet science fiction novel and film Aelita
