= 1974 Birthday Honours (New Zealand) =

Awards list for New Zealand

The 1974 Queen's Birthday Honours in New Zealand, celebrating the official birthday of Elizabeth II, were appointments made by the Queen on the advice of the New Zealand government to various orders and honours to reward and highlight good works by New Zealanders. They were announced on 15 June 1974.

The recipients of honours are displayed here as they were styled before their new honour.

== Knight Bachelor ==
- Charles William Feilden Hamilton OBE – of Fairlie. For services to manufacturing.
- Alfred Hamish Reed CBE – of Dunedin. For services to literature and culture.
- Ronald Stewart Scott – of Christchurch. For services to sport, particularly the Commonwealth Games.
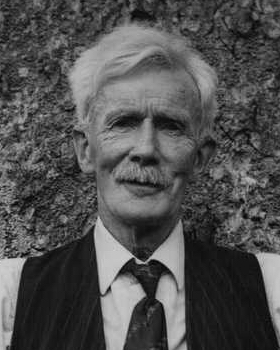
Sir Alfred Reed

== Order of St Michael and St George ==
=== Companion (CMG) ===
- The Reverend Wilfred Franklin Ford – of Wellington. For services to the community as a Methodist minister.
- Herbert Dudley Purves – of Dunedin. For services to medicine.

== Order of the British Empire ==
=== Commander (CBE) ===
Civil division

- Whina Cooper MBE JP – of Auckland. For services to Māori welfare and culture.
- Harold Hirst Innes – of Auckland. For services to the community.
- Robert Millin McCulloch MBE – mayor of Mount Wellington.
- George Emanuel Roth – of Christchurch. For services to science.
- Walter James Scott JP – of Wellington. For services to education and civil liberties.
- Professor Joan Stevens – of Wellington. For services to teaching and scholarship.

Military division

- Commodore John Foster McKenzie OBE – Royal New Zealand Navy.
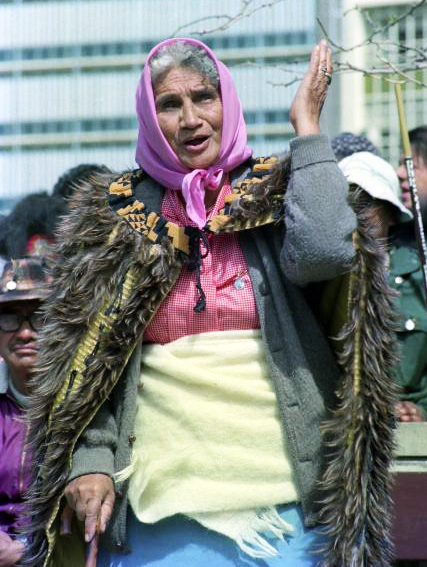
Whina Cooper

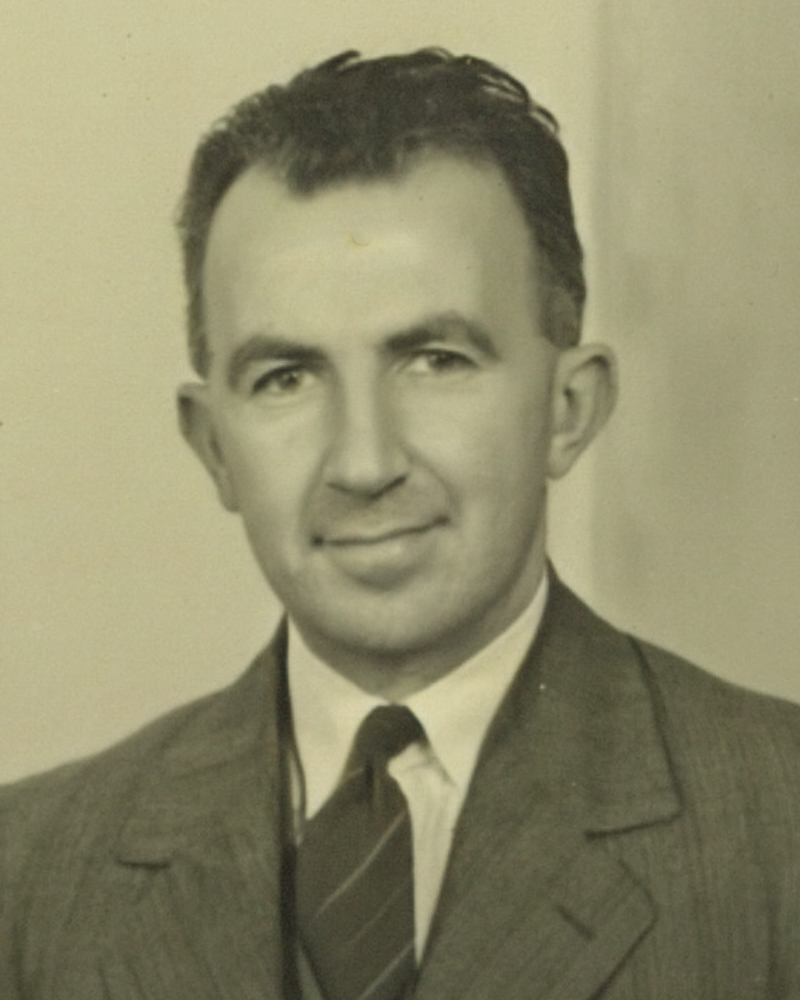
Harold Innes

=== Officer (OBE) ===
Civil division

- Jean Elizabeth Ballard – of Dunedin. For services to education and the Young Women's Christian Association.
- Ellen Edith Bell – of Hamilton. For services to the trade-union movement.
- Professor Emeritus Edward Musgrave Blaiklock – of Auckland. For services to scholarship and the community.
- Joseph Burstein – of Katikati. For services to the community and to medicine.
- Raymond John Patrick Columbus – of Auckland. For services to entertainment.
- Joseph Bernard Francis Cotterill – of Wanganui. For public services.
- Elsie Elizabeth Davidge – of Rotorua. For services to the National Marriage Guidance Council and to medicine.
- Arnott Maxwell Fernie – of Wellington. For services to music.
- Robert Renton Grigor – of Auckland. For services to the community, to sport and to medicine.
- Elizabeth Kate Hughes – of Auckland. For services to medicine.
- James Richmond Johnstone – of Auckland. For services to the theatre.
- Arthur Jack Smaill BEM – of Christchurch. For services to road safety.
- Richard Wheatley Staples Stevens – of Nelson. For services to the tobacco-growing industry.
- Douglas Owen Walker JP – of Howick. For services to the export trade and the forest industry.

Military division

- Captain Fred Hutchinson Bland – Royal New Zealand Navy.
- Lieutenant Colonel Allen Peniston Coster ED – Royal New Zealand Infantry Regiment (Territorial Force).
- Group Captain Michael Frank McDonald Palmer – Royal New Zealand Air Force.
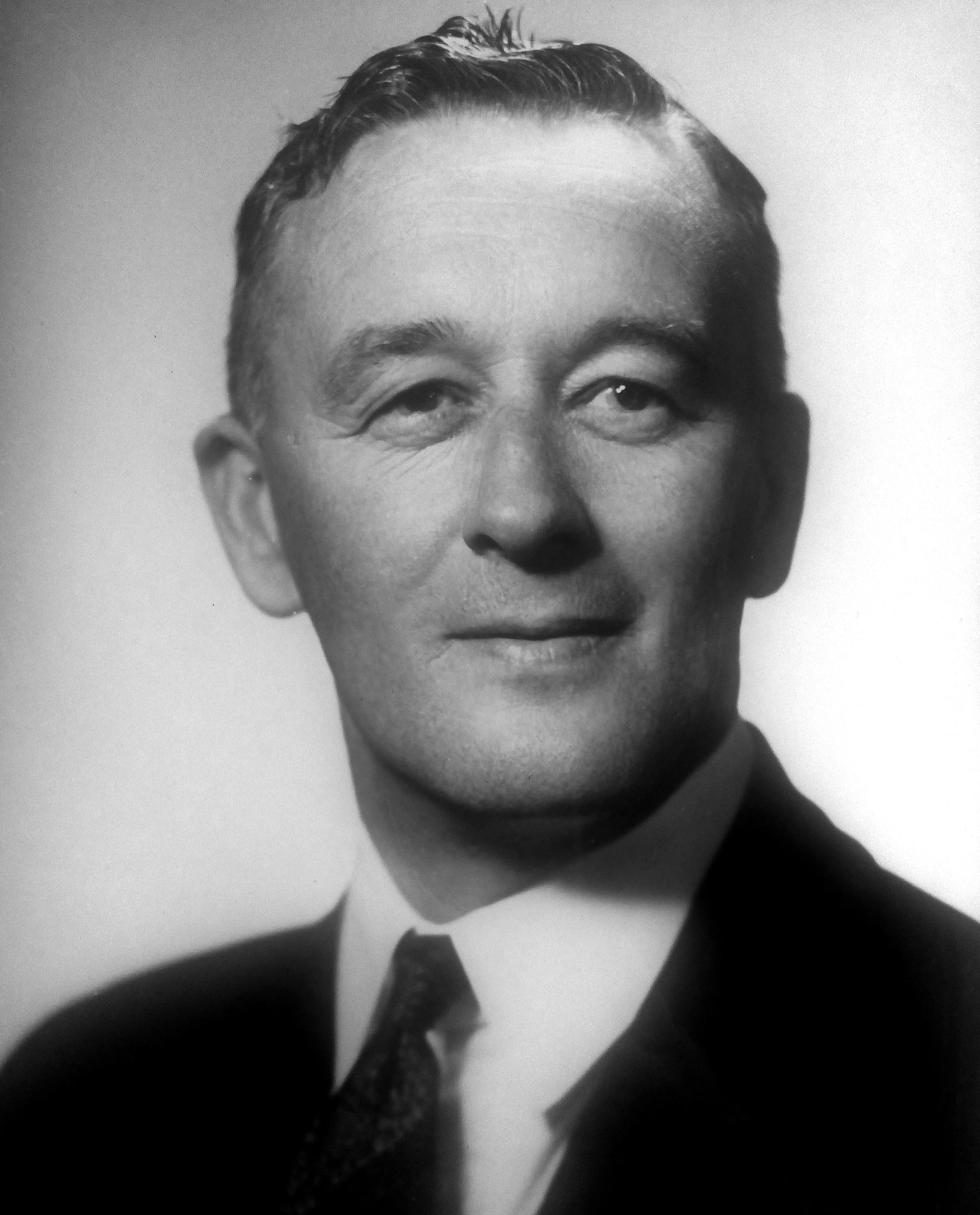
Joe Cotterill

=== Member (MBE) ===
Civil division

- Ernest Neil Adams JP – of Invercargill. For services to local government.
- Anita Pearl Barker – of Gisborne. For services to local government and the community.
- Esme Hilda Fraquair Baines Cooper – of Auckland. For services to nursing.
- Henry Hodgson Craig ED – of Auckland. For services to education.
- George Fenwick Duxfield JP – of Matamata. For services to the community.
- Alexandrina Ellison – of Dunedin. For services to life-saving.
- Ian Douglas Galloway – director of parks and reserves, Wellington City Corporation.
- The Reverend Maurice John Goodall – Christchurch city missioner.
- Detective Chief Superintendent Francis Augustine Gordon – of Auckland. For services to the New Zealand Police.
- Harold Richard Heiford ED JP – of Rotorua. For services to the community.
- Carrick Leslie Hewson JP – of Auckland. For services to the community.
- Clarice Isobel Johnstone – of Christchurch. For services to the community.
- Thomas William Lee JP – of Hokitika. For services to the community.
- Maurice Joseph Lepper – of Christchurch. For services to the New Zealand Cadet Force.
- Doris Emily McCulloch – of Auckland. For services to the community.
- Mary Elizabeth Mackenzie – of Lower Hutt. For services to the arts and teaching.
- Professor Janetta Mary McStay – of Auckland. For services to music.
- Alan Henderson Meikleham – of North Canterbury. For services to the community and to medicine.
- Wiremu Te Ranga Poutapu – of Ngāruawāhia. For services to Māori arts and crafts.
- Maurice Alfred Till – of Dunedin. For services to music.
- Eric Bernard Weber JP – of Northland. For services to local government.
- Frank David Winter – of Wellington. For services to the community.
- Barbara Annie Wood – of Thames. For services to country women.
- Rae Mary Woods – of Auckland. For services to the Intellectually Handicapped Children's Society.

Military division

- Stores Warrant Officer Ken Mervyn Mutch – Royal New Zealand Navy.
- Lieutenant Commander Geoffrey Maxwell Walton – Royal New Zealand Navy.
- Chaplain Third Class John Ellis Carde – Royal New Zealand Chaplains' Department (Regular Force).
- Captain James Donald Carson – Royal New Zealand Infantry Regiment (Regular Force).
- Warrant Officer First Class Henry Eric Luskie – Royal New Zealand Army Ordnance Corps (Regular Force).
- Flight Lieutenant Kelvin David Breeze – Royal New Zealand Air Force.
- Squadron Leader Donald Gray McAllister – Royal New Zealand Air Force.
- Warrant Officer Edgar Reginald Patterson – Royal New Zealand Air Force.
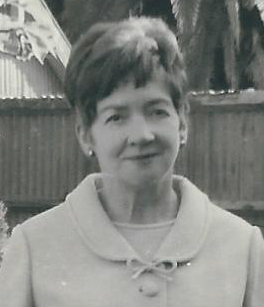
Janetta McStay

== Companion of the Imperial Service Order (ISO) ==
- Arthur Mann Dinsdale – chief communications officer, Ministry of Foreign Affairs.

== British Empire Medal (BEM) ==
Civil division

- Doreen Mary Allen – of South Dunedin. For services to guiding.
- Arthur Tukiri Anderson – of Taumarunui. For services to the Returned Services Association and the community.
- Myrtle Florence McKenzie Becks – of Kaiapoi. For services to the community and St John's Ambulance Brigade.
- Cecil Frederick Boyd Clarke – of Timaru. For services to the community.
- Alice Edith Cole – of Auckland. For services to multiple sclerosis sufferers.
- Eleanor May Currin – of Wanganui. For services to the community.
- William Arthur Dingle – of Auckland. For services to nursing as a hospital orderly.
- Dorothy Ida Eyre – of Auckland. For services to the Civilian Maimed Association.
- Moana Maru Gow – of Otago. For services to the community and to medicine.
- Edward Horace Gowan – of Dannevirke. For services to the community.
- Winifred Beatrice Hamilton – of Tuatapere. For services to the community.
- Elizabeth Aurelia Hobson – of Napier. For services to the community.
- The Reverend Archibald McGilp Kirkwood – of Auckland. For services to the community and as a Presbyterian minister.
- Gladys Havelock McArthur – of Alexandra. For services to horticulture and the community.
- Norman Neil McDonald – of Wellington. For services to Governors-General as head chauffeur.
- Catherine Eupkemia Barlow Matthews – of Golden Bay. For services to the community.
- Alan Lindley Murray JP – of Oamaru. For services to local government.
- The Reverend Father John Anthony Noonan – of Christchurch. For services to the community.
- Mary Bridget O'Loughlin – of Bennetts, North Canterbury. For services to the Post Office.
- Leo Frederick Parker – of New Plymouth. For services to the environment as a nurseryman.
- Tumanako Puna Reweti – of Auckland. For services to the community.
- Alexander Stuart Robins MC – of Queenstown. For services to the community.
- Edward Noah Rowe JP – of Palmerston North. For services to the community.
- Margaret Olive Russell JP – of Auckland. For services to the community.
- Eleanor Taylor – of Nelson. For services to the community.
- Maude Armstrong Taylor – of Hamilton. For services to the community.
- Norah Constance Taylor – of Levin. For services to the community.
- Margaret Mary Webber – of Dannevirke. For services to the community.

Military division

- Petty Officer Radio Mechanic Robyn Joseph Hudson – Royal New Zealand Navy.
- Stores Chief Petty Officer Wayne Robert Linn – Royal New Zealand Navy.
- Control Electrical Artificer First Class Richard Grant Wilson – Royal New Zealand Navy.
- Staff Sergeant Percival William Cussen – Royal New Zealand Army Medical Corps (Regular Force).
- Staff Sergeant Graeme Stephen Vivian – Royal New Zealand Corps of Signals (Territorial Force).
- Flight Sergeant Trevor Robert McGregor – Royal New Zealand Air Force.
- Flight Sergeant Peter Hendry Newall – Royal New Zealand Air Force.
- Flight Sergeant William Lindsay Taylor – Royal New Zealand Air Force.

== Royal Red Cross ==
=== Associate (ARRC) ===
- Matron Helen Judith Macann – Royal New Zealand Nursing Corps (Regular Force).

== Air Force Cross (AFC) ==
- Flight Lieutenant John Douglas Peterson DFC – Royal New Zealand Air Force.
