= Harold Innes =

New Zealand businessman, politician, and philanthropist

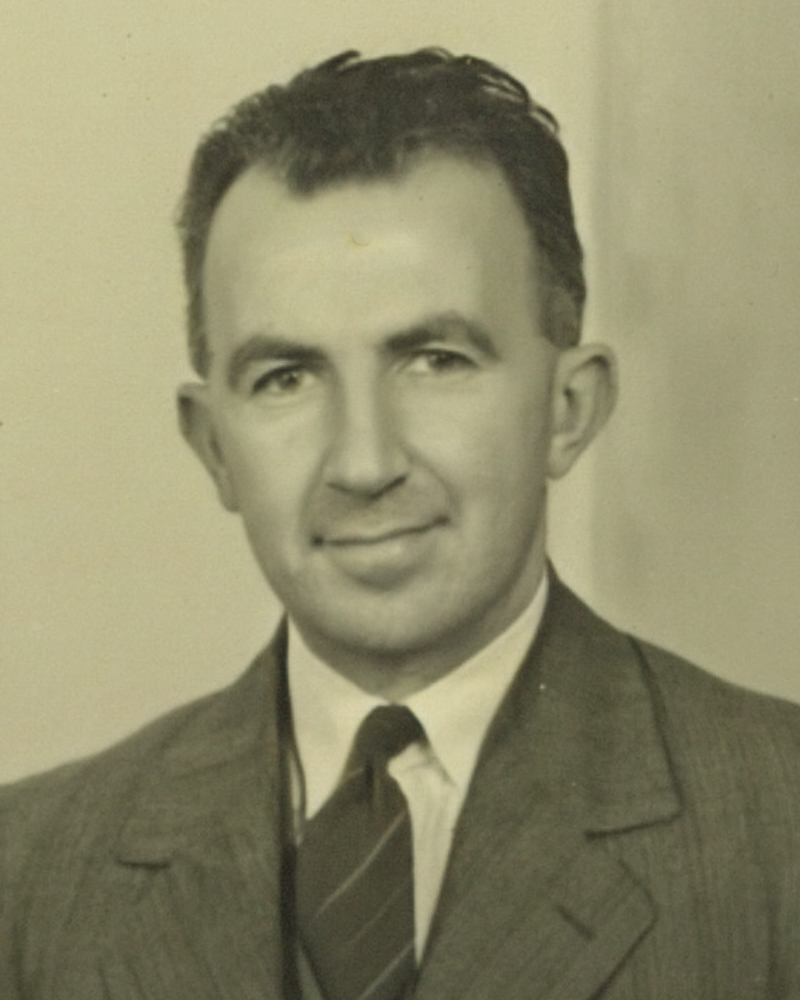
Innes in 1943

Harold Hirst Innes CBE (26 March 1909 – 30 January 1985) was a New Zealand salesman, dairy industry negotiator and marketer, businessman, company director, local politician, and philanthropist. He was born in Hamilton, New Zealand, on 26 March 1909.

In the 1974 Queen's Birthday Honours, Innes was appointed a Commander of the Order of the British Empire, for services to the community.
