= Mary Jane Innes =

Mary Jane Innes (née Lewis, 18 April 1852 – 14 November 1941) was a Welsh-born New Zealand brewery manager.

== Early life ==
Mary Jane Lewis was born on a farm in Llanvaches, Monmouthshire, Wales on 18 April 1852. Her parents were Thomas Lewis and Hannah Morgan Lewis. She immigrated to New Zealand with her older brother and sister in 1870, after their parents died.

== Career ==
Mary Jane Innes owned and operated Te Awamutu Brewery from 1877 (with her husband), and Waikato Breweries from 1889. In widowhood she launched the successful C. L. Innes and Company, in partnership with her eldest son Charles Lewis Innes. She turned the company over to two of her sons in 1912. The Innes brewing and bottling businesses not only produced alcoholic beverages, but "aerated waters," thus making a start to the soft-drink industry in New Zealand. Her grandson Harold Innes was senior director of Innes Industries in 1961, when they merged with another company to create Oasis Group.

== Personal life and legacy ==
Mary Jane Lewis married Scotsman Charles Innes in Auckland in 1874. They had ten children together. She was widowed in 1899. Mary Jane Innes died in Auckland in 1941, age 89. Her remains were buried in Hamilton East Cemetery.

In 2013, she was inducted into the New Zealand Business Hall of Fame, 72 years after her death.

Objects and papers belonging to Innes and her family are part of the collection in the Waikato Museum. Mary Jane's grandson Colin V. Innes co-wrote a book about the family's early history in brewing, A Crown for the Lady: The Unravelling of a Pioneer Story (Tauranga: Moana Press, 1989).
