= Gary Lewis (outdoor writer) =

Gary Lewis (born in 1967) is an outdoor writer, author and TV host residing in Bend, Oregon.

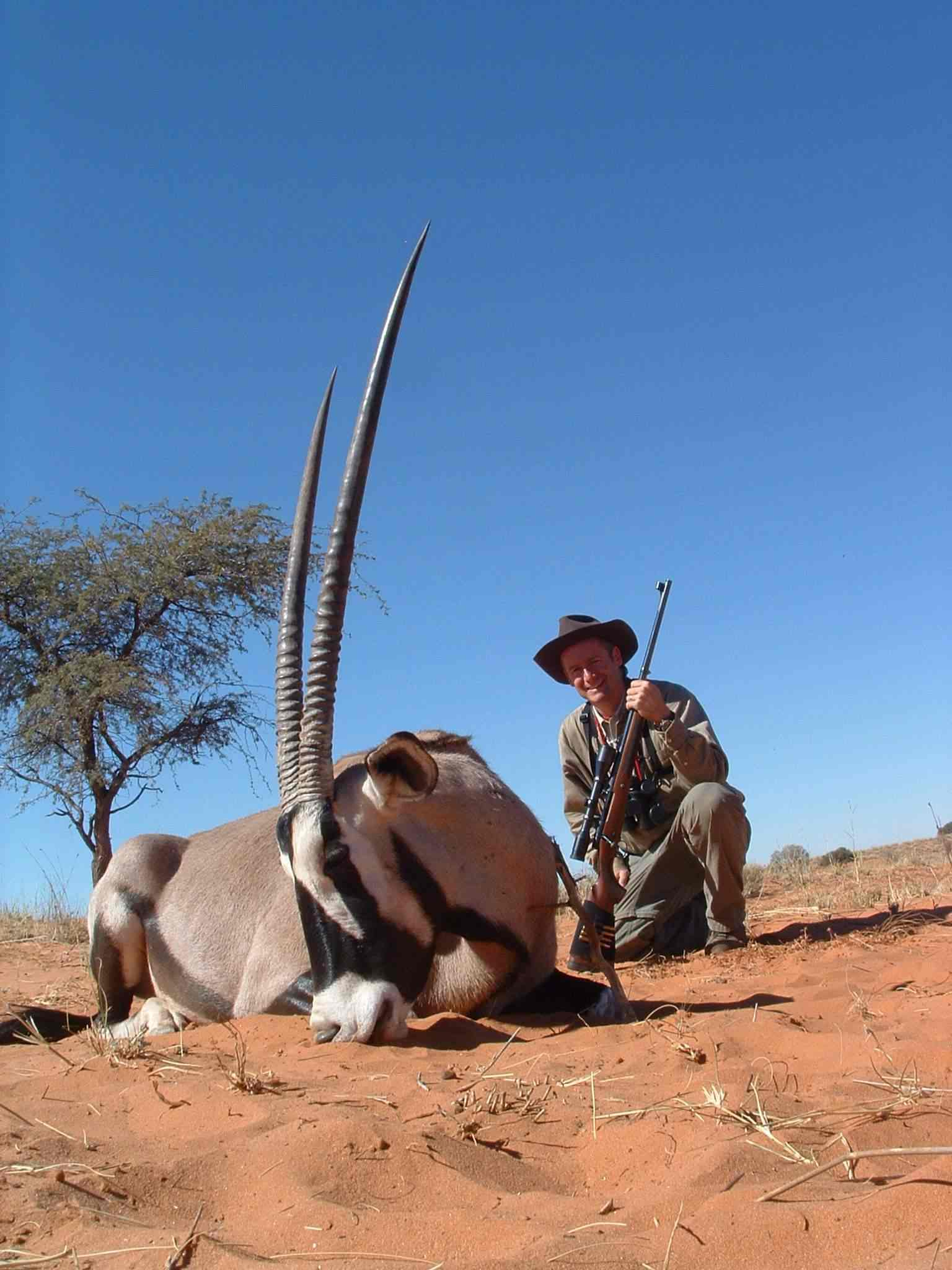
Gary Lewis with gemsbok in Africa

== Personal life ==
Lewis was raised in southwest Washington (Kalama and Vancouver) before moving to the outskirts of Oregon City at the age of 19. At the age of 20, Lewis married his wife, Merrilee. The couple lived in the Willamette Valley until 1994. Lewis and his wife, Merrilee, currently reside in Central Oregon with their three daughters.

== Career ==
He began his outdoor writing career in 1995 with a story published in American Bowhunter. In 1996, The Bend Bulletin newspaper began to publish his column. His first book, Sun Publishing's Hunting Oregon, was published in 1999.

In 2009, Lewis, in cooperation with producer Brad Douglas, began a TV show called Gary Lewis’s High Desert Outdoorsman, which aired on affiliate stations in Oregon, northern California, Idaho, Alaska and Wyoming.

In 2010, Lewis re-branded his TV Show to Gary Lewis’s Adventure Journal in cooperation with producer Eli Pyke.

In 2014, with producer Samuel Pyke, of Hillshadow Pictures, Lewis changed the name of the show to Frontier Unlimited, still in production (December 2017). The TV show is accessed on Pursuit Channel (United States, United Kingdom) and Hunt Channel (United States, Mexico, Canada) and on a Northwest regional network (Portland, Bend, Salem, Eugene). The show was also picked up in 18 Russian-speaking countries and airs in the Russian language.

Lewis has written, or contributed to, 16 books. He has hosted three DVDs.

Lewis has hunted and fished in seven countries and across the United States. An international hunter, one of his favorite destinations is Africa. Here is a quote from a story he wrote for ESPN: "As the sun rose, the ground sparkled with golden mica and quartz. Dry river canyons cut through the hills, and game trails led in and out of the brush. Unlike the Kalahari, which I had glimpsed from the airplane, here the vegetation was thick. Almost every bush and tree had thorns.

"In the early light, gemsbok, hartebeest and kudu were easily spotted by the reflection of sunlight on horn. We stopped to glass on top of one hill, and a troop of baboons took off running along the road below us."

He is twice past President of the Northwest Outdoor Writers Association (NOWA). He was honored with NOWA's Enos Bradner award for 2009 (May 2010).

Lewis was also Associate Producer for Scott Linden Outdoors radio, heard on 150 stations around the country.

Lewis is a columnist for The Bend Bulletin, a Contributing Editor for Successful Hunter magazine and a humor columnist. His articles have appeared in Sports Afield, Alaska Airlines' Alaska Beyond, Horizon, Game & Fish magazines, Salmon Trout Steelheader, Oregon Hunter, American Handgunner, Surplus Vintage & Classic Firearms, Bear Hunting Magazine, Fish Alaska, Sportsman's News, MDF, Covey Rise, Flyfishing and Tying Journal and many others.

== Authored works ==
- Fishing Central Oregon, Gary Lewis Outdoors, 2016
- Fishing Mount Hood Country (co-authored by Robert H. Campbell), Gary Lewis Outdoors, 2015
- A Bear Hunter's Guide to the Universe, Gary Lewis Outdoors, 2014
- Gary Lewis's Hunting Oregon, 2010
- Oregon Lake Maps and Fishing Guide, Frank Amato Publications, 2010
- Idaho River Maps and Fishing Guide, Frank Amato Publications
- John Nosler – Going Ballistic
- Deer Hunting Tactics for Today's Big Game Hunter
- Freshwater Fishing Oregon & Washington
- Sun Publishing's Hunting Oregon.
- Is He A Man Or Just Another Guy? (co-author, his wife Merrilee)

Contributions;

- Lewis contributed to the fifth edition of Fishing Central Oregon and Beyond.
- Lewis coauthored Creative Publishing International's Black Bear Hunting with Lee Van Tassell.
- Lewis updated Creative Publishing International's Complete Guide to Hunting
- In 2008, CPI published Lewis's The Complete Guide to Hunting and Trout Fishing in the Pacific Northwest.

== Awards ==
2010 – Lewis was presented with NOWA's Enos Bradner Award.

Five of his books have won NOWA's Excellence in Craft awards and he has received numerous awards for his newspaper columns and magazine articles.

== Influences ==
Lewis, through his association with other outdoor writers, met long-time writer Ed Park, a frequent contributor to Outdoor Life, Field and Stream, Sports Afield and other publications. Lewis and Park were good friends from 1999 through 2008, when Ed Park died. Lewis counts Ed Park, Bob Nosler and John Nosler (Founder of Nosler, an ammunition and hand-loading manufacturer) his mentors.
