= Virginia Emerson Lewis =

American political scientist

- Born: 1912 or 1913; Memphis, Tennessee
- Died: December 4, 1984; Frederick, Maryland
- Education: Washington University in St. Louis; George Washington University; New York University
- Scientific career
- Fields: Political science
- Workplaces: United States Department of the Treasury; Hood College

Virginia Emerson Lewis (d. December 4, 1984) was an American political scientist and legal scholar. She was a professor of political science at Hood College from 1947 until 1984, and she was the head of the History and Political Science Department there from 1965 until 1979. On her 70th birthday, Virginia Emerson Lewis Day was proclaimed in the state of Maryland, and in 1984 Hood College established a Virginia E. Lewis Chair in Politics.

== Life and career ==
Lewis was born in Memphis, Tennessee. She attended the Washington University in St. Louis, graduating in 1935. She then attended George Washington University, graduating with a degree in law in 1941. She continued her studies at New York University, obtaining a PhD in political science in 1955. Her doctoral dissertation was entitled Fifty Years of Politics in Memphis, 1900–1950. In the intervening years, Lewis worked as a lawyer at the United States Department of the Treasury.

Lewis joined the faculty at Hood College in 1947, and stayed in that faculty for the remainder of her career. She was the head of the History and Political Science Department at Hood College from 1965 to 1979. She retired in 1968, but she continued to teach classes at Hood.

From 1978 until 1984, Lewis was a member of the Judicial Selection Board for the Maryland Sixth Judicial Circuit. She was also active in the politics of Frederick County, Maryland, including directing the campaign of Stephen H. Sachs for the governor of Maryland. On Lewis's 70th birthday, in 1984, Maryland Governor Harry Hughes proclaimed a Virginia Emerson Lewis Day in the state of Maryland in her honor. Lewis died on December 4, 1984, in Frederick, Maryland. Hood college endowed a Virginia E. Lewis Chair in Politics in her memory.

== Selected works ==
- Fifty Years of Politics in Memphis, 1900–1950 (1955)

== Selected awards ==
- Honoree of Virginia Emerson Lewis Day in Maryland (1984)
- Namesake of the Virginia E. Lewis Chair in Politics, Hood College
