= Sage Frederick Lewis =

American homelessness activist and author

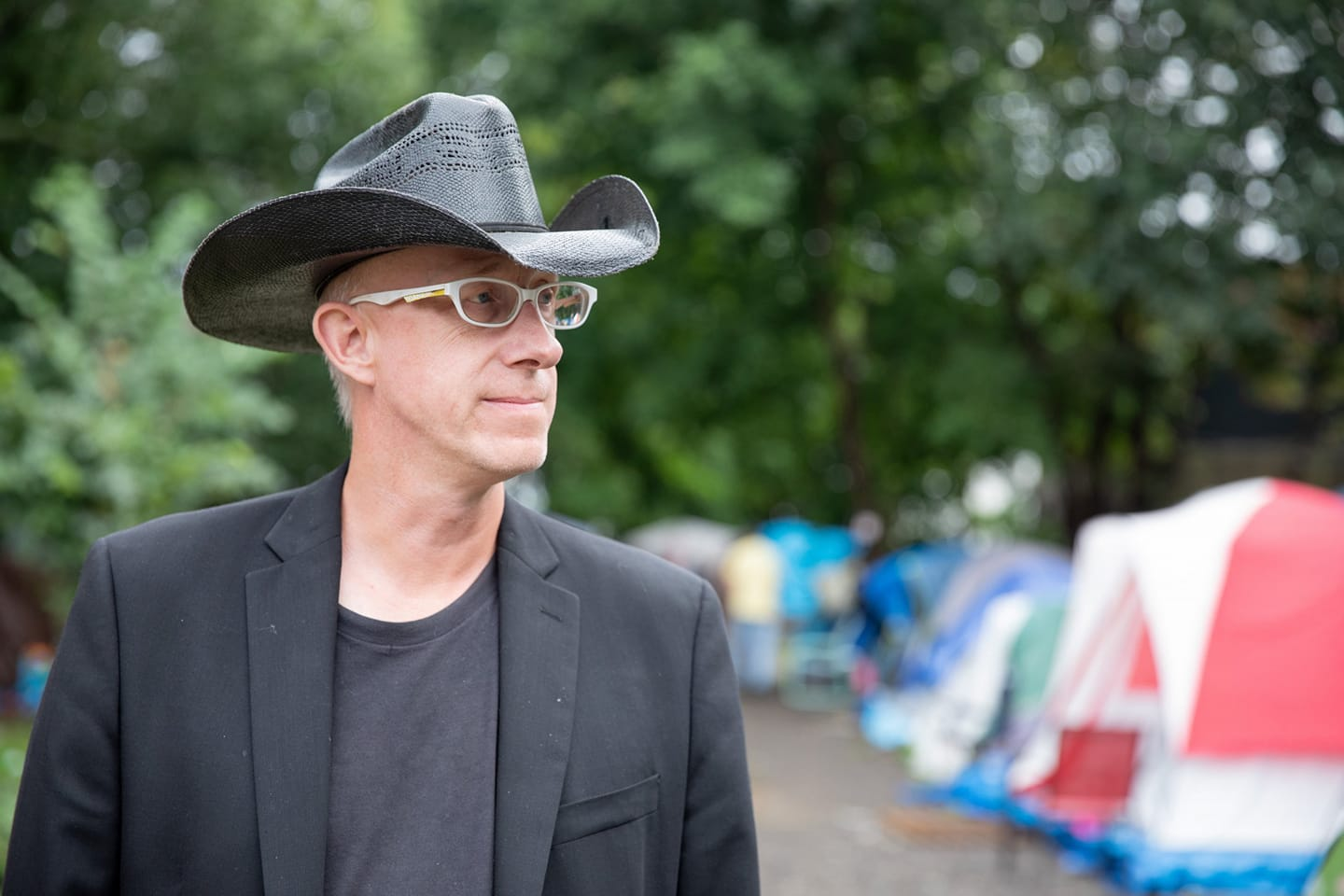
- Born: September 28, 1971 (age 55)
- Occupations: Activist, author, businessman

Sage Frederick Lewis (born September 28, 1971) is an American homelessness activist, author, and small business owner. He is known for allowing a homeless encampment of 50 people on his private property in Akron, Ohio.

== Career ==
Lewis founded SageRock Inc., a digital marketing company with his wife, Rocky Lewis, in 1999. It grew to 25 people with annual earnings of up to $1.5 million at its peak. In 2009, the Great Recession left the business with only three employees.

Lewis also hosted the daily web series Web Marketing Watch, and wrote the digital marketing book Link Building is Dead. Long Live Link Building! Lewis is also an auctioneer and owner of Rubber City Auctions.

With no previous political experience, Lewis ran for Akron mayor as an Independent in 2015. He initially filed a petition to run as a Democrat, but his petition was not certified and he was not included on the final ballot. During his campaign, Lewis made connections with members of the homeless community.

== Homeless tent village ==
In January 2017, Summit Metro Parks closed a tent community to make way for a new trail called Freedom Trail. Lewis allowed some of the homeless displaced by Freedom Trail construction to camp on his property; some of them ran a thrift store on Lewis's property. It later became a 50-person tent village initially named Second Chance Village, later known as the Homeless Charity & Village. Lewis helped establish rules for the village, shared resources with its residents, and helped pay for the village's property tax and bills. He and the village were the topics of a documentary series that was shown at the Cleveland International Film Festival. In 2018, the Lewises published a book about some of the village's residents, titled Out of the Shadows: An American Homeless Story.

In 2018, Akron officials expressed concerns about the village breaking city zoning restrictions, and Lewis filed a petition requesting a zoning exception. The ACLU of Ohio, the Northeast Ohio Coalition for the Homeless, several other nonprofits, and local academics sent a letter to the city of Akron urging them to keep the village.

The homeless-run tent village was forced to close by Akron City Council in an 8–4 vote in September 2018. Akron officials ordered the village's inhabitants to vacate in early December 2018. Lewis announced plans to sue the city over the decision.

After the forced closure of the tent village, Lewis began renovating houses to use as transitional shelter for homeless people. The charity Lewis runs has two houses in operation.

=== Legal issues ===
After the closure of the tent village, the Libertarian law firm Institute for Justice represented Lewis pro-bono to appeal his case in the Summit County Court of Common Pleas. They filed a separate but related complaint against the city on the basis that the government infringed on Lewis' constitutional right to shelter the homeless on his private property.

Lewis appealed to the Ohio Supreme Court to intervene after an appellate court ruled that he had improperly filed suit with the city's law director instead of the city council. In April 2020, the Ohio Supreme Court decided not to consider his appeal.

Akron mayor Dan Horrigan wrote an op-ed attacking Lewis. "For all the posturing, loud impassioned speeches, blog posts, public requests for donations and edgy movie posters depicting him as some type of savior, Sage Lewis has made little progress on actually moving the needle on homelessness."

== Bibliography ==
- Lewis, Sage. (2013). Link Building is Dead. Long Live Link Building! Akron, Ohio: SageRock Publishing. ISBN 9780615829630
- Lewis, Rocky; Lewis, Sage. (2018). Out of the Shadows: An American Homeless Story. Akron, Ohio: Homeless Charity. ISBN 9780578414171
- Lewis, Sage. (2021). The Homeless Activist. Akron, Ohio: SageRock Publishing. ISBN 9781732977426
