= Jan Łoś =

Polish footballer

Personal information
- Date of birth: 20 July 2000 (age 26)
- Place of birth: Gdynia, Poland
- Height: 1.75 m (5 ft 9 in)
- Position: Forward

Youth career
- –2012: UKS Cisowa
- 2012–2016: Bałtyk Gdynia

Senior career*
Years	Team	Apps	(Gls)
2016–2020	Arka Gdynia II	15	(8)
2018–2020	Arka Gdynia	6	(0)
Total		21	(8)

International career
2017–2018	Poland U18	5	(0)
2018	Poland U19	4	(0)
- * Club domestic league appearances and goals

Jan Łoś (born 20 July 2000) is a Polish retired professional footballer who played as a forward. On 8 May 2018, he made his Ekstraklasa debut for Arka Gdynia, as his team defeated Cracovia 2–0.
