= Reginald Lewis (cricketer) =

South African cricketer

Personal information
- Full name: Reginald Chester Vale Lewis
- Born: 4 October 1927; Cape Town, Cape Province, Union of South Africa
- Died: 1 August 1981 (aged 53); Cape Town, Cape Province, South Africa
- Batting: Right-handed
- Bowling: Leg break

Domestic team information
- Years: Team
- 1949–1950: Oxford University
- 1949: Oxfordshire

Career statistics
Competition	First-class
Matches	4
Runs scored	65
Batting average	16.25
100s/50s	–/–
Top score	34
Balls bowled	474
Wickets	8
Bowling average	27.75
5 wickets in innings	–
10 wickets in match	–
Best bowling	3/31
Catches/stumpings	–/–
- Source: Cricinfo, 28 February 2019

Reginald Chester Vale Lewis (4 October 1927 – 1 August 1981) was a South African first-class cricketer.

Lewis was born in Cape Town, where he was educated at the Diocesan College. From there, he went to England in 1946 to attend Keble College, Oxford, where he read physics. A keen sportsman, he was a member of both Oxford University Cricket Club and the Athletics Club, of which he was president in 1948–49. He played first-class cricket for Oxford University, debuting in 1949 against the Free Foresters at the University Parks. He played twice more for Oxford in 1950, against Hampshire and Warwickshire, before appearing for the Free Foresters against Oxford University in the same year. His overall first-class record was 65 runs with a highest score of 34, and 8 wickets with his leg break bowling, with best figures of 3 for 31. Lewis also played minor counties cricket for Oxfordshire in 1949, making four appearances in the Minor Counties Championship.

After graduating from Keble College, Lewis returned to South Africa where he was in business. He married Elizabeth Affleck-Graves in 1961. Lewis died in Cape Town in August 1981.
