= Row Lewis =

Prime Minister of Saint Vincent and the Grenadines

- Education: University of Florida
- Known for: Founder of the Liberty Fellowship Center
- Scientific career
- Fields: liberation theologian

Row Lewis is a Grenadian activist, teacher, life coach, vocalist, and liberation theologian. She is the founder of Liberty Fellowship Center, a non-profit ministry, where she serves as the Executive Director and Spiritual Advisor.

== Biography ==
=== Early life ===
The daughter of a Pentecostal Pastor, Rev. Raymond Lewis of the True Vine Church, Row Lewis is an ordained minister with academic studies in Comparative Religion, World Religion, Psychology, Counseling, and Journalism from the University of Florida and Hope Theological Seminary. She has enjoyed a career in television broadcasting for over a decade, winning Associated Press Awards (1998, 2001) for interviews with former U.S. Secretary of Defense, William Cohen, and recording artists, The Baha Men.

Born into a musical family, Row took the stage singing and performing at age 5, but still feels she has more to accomplish:

"I have tested the physical constraints of my body from a young age…defying time, space, and circumstance on track fields, basketball courts, martial art arenas. I have pushed and prodded my intellect on academic as well as home fronts…always seeking…always yearning…always pressing for more…more…and more still. I am more than well aware of what it's like to achieve and succeed, but now view 'success' in very different constructs...I still have much work to do."

Row says her focus now is stayed on the human condition.

"My message is one of liberation...It's my desire to bring healing to all oppressed people. I want to encourage a higher state of spiritual vibration in this world...and bring us all back to a greater connectedness to our Creator Source and thus to each other."

=== Career ===
In 1994 Row started the music group, Fresh Fire, with her brother (Attorney and Music Producer, Esmond Lewis) and sister (Entrepreneur, Rachel Lewis) serving as lead vocalist. Her band toured and shared stages with such gospel artists as: Kirk Franklin, Yolanda Adams, Cece Winans, Donnie McClurkin, T-Bone, Hezekiah Walker, and Vicki Winans. Fresh Fire recorded two albums, including the acclaimed, Summer of '94. Fusing jazz, calypso, folk, reggae, soul and blues with inspirational lyrics, the group enjoyed several crossover hits.

In 2003 through 2004, Row took the stage as a solo artist and performer, of original musical and spoken word pieces, under her "Soul Connection" label. Currently, Row is working on a new project entitled, "The Poet Speaks", where she takes on the issues of race, class, gender, religion, and social justice.

=== Personal life ===
Row Lewis is originally from the Island of Grenada, born to her Trinidadian mother Yvonne, and her Grenadian/Vincentian father, Raymond. She is the fourth of seven children. Row currently resides in Raleigh, North Carolina.
