= Eugene Lewis =

Eugene Lewis (c. 1940 - May 5, 2024) was an American political scientist. One of the leading academic authorities on the concept of political entrepreneurship, Lewis is the author of Public Entrepreneurship: Toward a Theory of Bureaucratic Political Power (1980). His later research focused on the role of science and technology in politics and law. He also published works on 'political entrepreneurs' such as Admiral Hyman Rickover.

Lewis retired as a professor of political science at New College of Florida in 2007. He also served as the college's provost. He is a sculptor whose work has received international recognition and critical acclaim.

== Selected works ==
- Public Entrepreneurship: Toward a Theory of Bureaucratic Political Power: the organizational lives of Hyman Rickover, J. Edgar Hoover, and Robert Moses. Indiana University Press (1980)
