= Frank Winter =

Ngāi Tahu leader (1906–1976)

Frank David Winter MBE (5 January 1906 – 28 March 1976) was a South Island Māori leader, and later a resident of Wellington. He was chairman of the Ngāi Tahu Maori Trust Board for almost a decade and was also the chairman of the Akapaitiki 'A' Block Incorporation.

Winter was a patron of the Victoria University of Wellington Māori Club from its inception; was national treasurer of the Citizens' All Black Tour Association; and was a past secretary of the Poneke Māori Committee. He was also national secretary of the New Zealand Institute of Architects.

Winter was educated at Te Aute College, where he was dux in 1922 or 1923. In 1924 he joined the Maori Affairs Department (now Te Puni Kōkiri) and for the next nine years he was employed in the Ikaroa and South Island District Office in Wellington, after working in Gisborne.

In the 1974 Queen's Birthday Honours, Winter was appointed a Member of the Order of the British Empire, for services to the community.
