= Oswald Lewis (cricketer) =

Australian cricketer

Personal information
- Born: 28 February 1833; Sydney, Australia
- Died: 28 April 1895 (aged 62); Sydney, Australia
- Source: Cricinfo, 5 January 2017

Oswald Lewis (28 February 1833 – 28 April 1895) was an Australian cricketer. He played four first-class matches for New South Wales between 1856/57 and 1860/61.

== See also ==
- List of New South Wales representative cricketers
