= Linda Lewis (author) =

American writer

Linda Lewis is the author of a series of young adult novels, unofficially known as the "Linda Series". The series was published by Archway Paperbacks from 1985 to 1993. The series centers on Linda Berman and her love life from the fourth grade to the summer after her senior year. The first book, We Hate Everything But Boys (which deals with Linda's sixth grade experiences) is the most successful and well known of the series. It was released twice. According to worldCat, the various books of this series are each found in approximately 100 - 200 U.S. libraries

Due to the success of We Hate Everything But Boys, Ms. Lewis was encouraged to write more books about Linda. In the years that would follow nine more books would be published. Here is a list of the Linda stories:

1. Want to Trade Two Brothers For a Cat? - Spring of 4th Grade
2. The Tomboy Terror in Bunk 109 - Summer after 4th Grade
3. 2 Young 2 Go 4 Boys - 5th Grade
4. We Hate Everything But Boys - 6th Grade
5. Is There Life After Boys? - 7th Grade
6. We Love Only Older Boys - 8th Grade
7. My Heart Belongs to That Boy - 9th Grade
8. All For the Love of That Boy - 10th and 11th Grades
9. Dedicated To That Boy I Love - 12th Grade
10. Loving Two is Hard to Do - Summer after 12th Grade

Note - There is also another book that is related to the series entitled, Preteen Means In Between which is about Linda's friend, Darlene Mason who appears in 2 Young 2 Go For Boys, We Hate Everything But Boys, and Is There Life After Boys?.
