= Rose Mabel Lewis =

Welsh writer and suffragist (1853–1928)

- Born: Rose Mabel Durham; 1853; Llanddewi Aberarth, Wales
- Died: 24 December 1928 (aged 74–75); Abergavenny, Monmouthshire, Wales
- Other names: Lewis Armytage (pseudonym)
- Occupations: Writer and suffragist
- Organization(s): Cardiff and District Women's Suffrage Society
- Children: 2

Rose Mabel Lewis (née Durham, 1853 – 24 December 1928) was a Welsh writer and suffragist who wrote under the pseudonym Lewis Armytage. She was the leader of the Cardiff and District Women's Suffrage Society, which was affiliated with the National Union of Women's Suffrage Societies (NUWSS).

== Personal life ==
Lewis was born in 1853 in Llanddewi Aberarth, Wales. Her father was an army officer. She married Colonel Henry Lewis of Greenmeadow, Glamorgan in 1879. They had two sons together.

== Activism ==
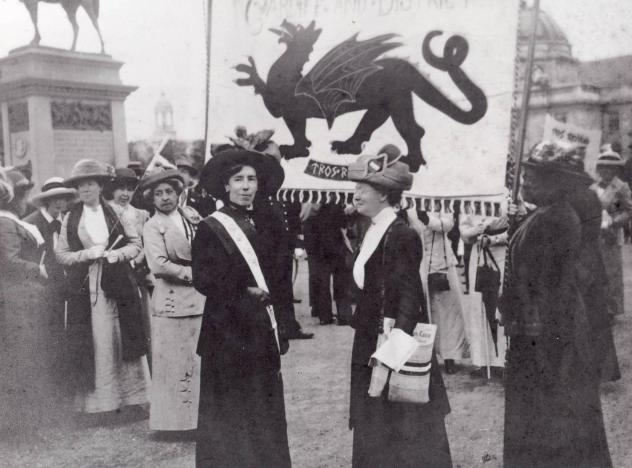
Women with the silk banner of the Cardiff and District Women's Suffrage Society at the Women's Suffrage Pilgrimage in Cathays Park, Cardiff, in 1913. Lewis is stood to the front on the left

Lewis was the leader of the Cardiff and District Women's Suffrage Society, which was affiliated with the National Union of Women's Suffrage Societies (NUWSS).

Lewis made the silk banner of the Cardiff Cardiff and District Women's Suffrage Society, which is now held in the collection at the National Museum Cardiff. The banner featured a large red wool Welsh dragon motif and the text Tros Rhyddid (for freedom).

The archival accession record details record that: "The banner was worked by Mrs Henry Lewis… [she] was also President of the South Wales Federation of Women’s Suffrage Societies + she led the S. Wales section of the great Suffrage Procession in London on June 17th 1911 [Women's Coronation Procession], walking in front of her own beautiful banner… It was a great occasion, some 40,000 to 50,000 men + women taking part in the walk from Whitehall through Pall Mall, St James’s Street + Piccadilly to the Albert Hall. The dragon attracted much attention – “Here comes the Devil” was the greeting of one group of on lookers."

== Writing ==
Lewis was also a writer who wrote under the pseudonym Lewis Armytage. Her published works include short stories and a play:

- Out of Tune, 2 volumes (London: Swan Sonnenschein, 1887)
- The Blue Mountains (London: W. H. Allen, 1890)
- Spindle and Shears: A Welsh Story, three act play (London: W. H. Allen, 1891)

== Death ==
Lewis died on 24 December 1928 in Abergavenny, Monmouthshire, Wales.
