= Becky Lewis =

English long-distance swimmer

Personal information
- Born: 1983-1984 Barrow-in-Furness, Great Britain

Sport
- Sport: Swimming
- Strokes: Long-distance swimming

Rebecca Lewis (born 1983 or 1984, known as Becky), is an English long-distance swimmer. She held the record among English women for the fastest crossing of the English channel in 2009, 2010, and 2013, and in 2016 set a record for the fastest two-way crossing of the channel for both British men and women. Between 2007 and 2022, she completed thirteen crossings of the Channel.

== Records and achievements ==
=== Irish Sea relay ===
In 2011 she swam for 35 hours 18 minutes as part of "The Swim", a relay team crossing the Irish Sea.

=== Loch Lomond ===
On 26 August 2012, she swam Scotland's Loch Lomond in 9:23:34, setting a new championship record for women. The time was ratified by the British Long Distance Swimming Association.

=== Two-way swim of Windermere ===
In 2015 she broke the record for the fastest time for a two-way swim the length of Windermere, in the regular competition held by the British Long Distance Swimming Association. Exiting the water first, she completed the swim in 8 hours 33 mins, breaking her own previous women's record by 14 minutes but the men's record as well. The old records were set in 2005 for women and 2007 for men.

=== Fastest British woman across English Channel ===
By 2016, Lewis held the record among British women for the fastest crossing of the channel, at eight hours 35 minutes.

=== Fastest two-way English Channel crossing ===
In 2016 she broke the record for the fastest British swimmer to make a two-way crossing of the English Channel with a time of 20 hours and 30 minutes. Her first crossing was around 10 hours, which she felt was rather slow, but when she made her second crossing in roughly the same time, she was pleased with her time.

== Awards ==
The Channel Swimming Association awards the Centenary Cup for the fastest English Channel swim of the year by a British person. Lewis won the Cup in 2009, 2010, and 2011.

== Swimming career ==
Lewis usually preferred an ordinary bathing suit over a wet suit for comfort. Her preferred nutrition was an energy gel and water which she would take every 40–45 minutes. Her preparation included carb loading in the weeks prior to an event.

Her swim in August 2015 raised funds for the Babygrow Appeal, supporting the Countess of Chester Hospital's neonatal unit after her nephew had been nursed there.

She appeared with Paul Rose in the "Windermere" episode of his 2018 BBC One series The Lakes with Paul Rose.

== Personal life ==
Lewis is a physiotherapist and works in Barrow-in-Furness.
