= Mary Parker Lewis =

American political consultant

Mary Parker Lewis is a political consultant who most famously served as Chief of Staff to Dr. Alan Keyes, candidate for President of the United States in 1996 and 2000. In addition to running both Keyes presidential campaigns, Lewis also ran the statesman's historic campaign for the U.S. Senate from Illinois against Barack Obama in 2004.

Her political works have come under scrutiny due to reports that in 2010, while these Political Action Committees (PACs) took in millions of dollars in donations, they paid out only a very small percentage to the causes they claim they are working to defend. Mary also took considerable compensation packages as well from these PACs.

Lewis was born and raised in southern California where she attended Scripps College in Claremont. She then completed graduate studies at Claremont Graduate School (now Claremont Graduate University) in her home state and at Notre Dame Institute in Virginia. Early in her career, Lewis served as a staffer with the Free Congress Foundation and the Hoover Institution. She became special assistant to the U.S. Secretary of Transportation and confidential assistant to William Kristol, Chief of Staff to U.S. Secretary of Education William Bennett.

Lewis is also known in conservative activist circles as Executive Director of the Declaration Foundation, grassroots organizations founded by Dr. Alan Keyes to advocate the basic principles and core values of the conservative movement in the United States.
