= Mary Lewis (soprano) =

American singer

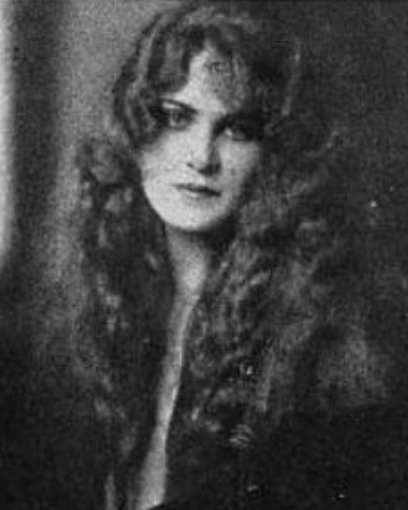
- Mary Lewis, from a 1926 publication
- Born: January 7, 1900; United States
- Died: December 31, 1941 (aged 41); New York, New York, U.S.
- Occupations: Singer, actress, vaudeville performer

Mary Sybil Kidd Maynard Lewis (January 7, 1900 (Note: "Lewis's baptismal records at St. Mary's Catholic Church in Hot Springs, Arkansas, give January 29, 1897, as her birth date.") – December 31, 1941) was an American lyric soprano and actress who had an active performance career in musicals, operas, vaudeville, and in film during the first half of the twentieth century. After beginning her career as a chorus girl in 1919, she was signed by the Christie Film Company to star in a series of comedic silent films made in 1920; most notably A Bashful Bigamist (released 1921). She later appeared in the Vitaphone Varieties, some of the earliest sound films made by Warner Bros., in 1926. Her first major stage role was as a featured singer in the Broadway musical revue Ziegfeld Follies of 1921. In 1923 her career reoriented towards opera, beginning with her opera debut at Vienna State Opera. After performing in European opera houses for a few years, she returned to the United States to join the roster of leading sopranos at the Metropolitan Opera in 1925 where she remained committed through 1930.

== Early years ==
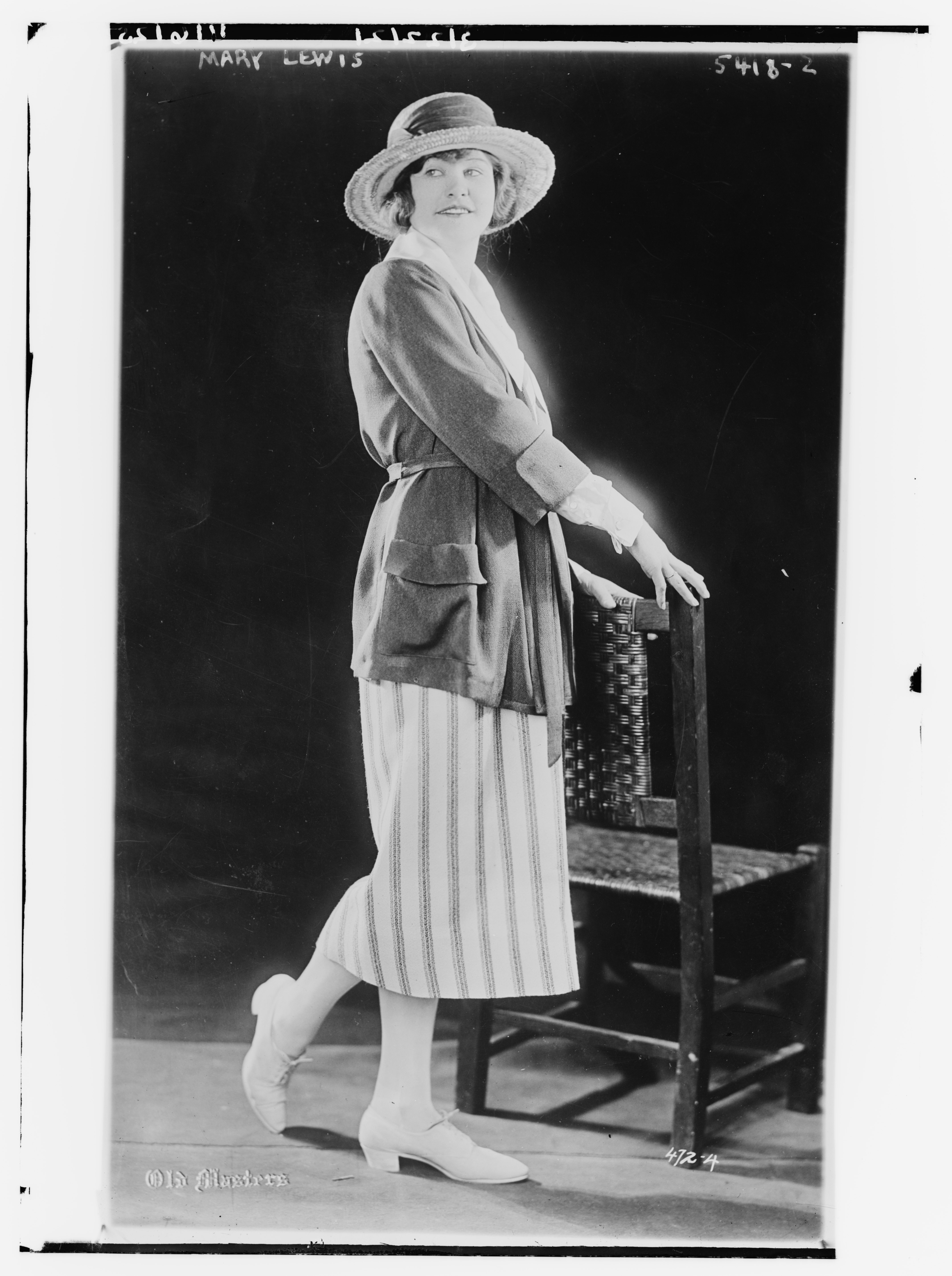
Mary Lewis, c. 1921

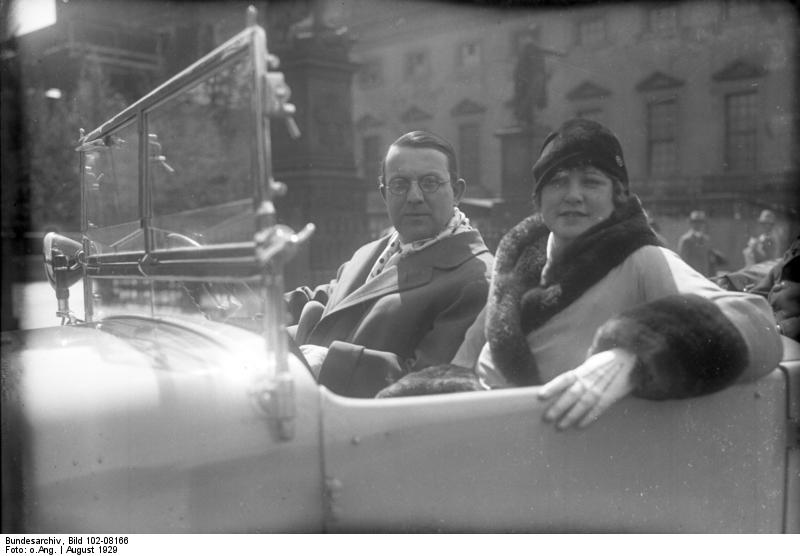
Lewis and her husband Michael Bohnen in Germany in 1929

Lewis was born Mary Kidd, the daughter of Charles Kidd and Hattie Lewis, in Hot Springs, Arkansas or Dallas, Texas. She had a brother, Joe. After the children's father died in 1899, their mother was unable to care for them and put them in an orphanage. Lewis gained a new home after she was found outside a church while she waited to meet a friend when the service ended. Her foster parents were William and Anna Fitch. (His name is also given as Frank F. Fitch.) He was a Methodist minister and a music teacher who taught her to play piano. As an adult, Lewis said that she received "a good musical education" in "a strict Methodist home". Her father spanked her when he felt that she had not practiced enough. She danced with no music in her room even though "dancing was strictly forbidden". She was also "thoroughly whipped" for playing jazz music on the piano. Her foster mother frequently caught her dancing and punished her each time. "She thought I was headed straight for the devil," Lewis said later. "She looked on the stage with horror."

In 1912, Lewis ran away from the Fitch home and, until 1915 she lived with H. F. and Carrie Auten, who had children about Lewis's age. During that time she went to Little Rock High School. She also took music, including lessons on a pipe organ, and became the organist at Second Baptist church.

== Career ==
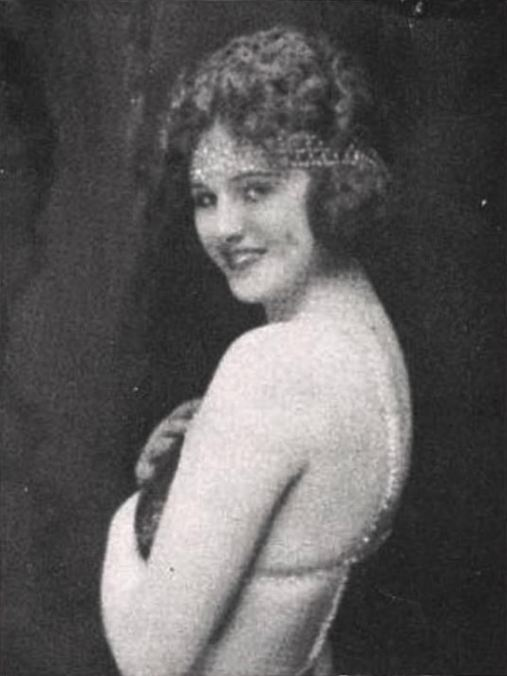
Lewis of the Ziegfeld Follies in 1921 and 1922

In 1919, Lewis joined a traveling company of the show Reckless Eve. It stranded her in San Francisco, and she began singing in a cabaret there. She also worked in a town in southern California as one of a group of women who sat in circles singing songs, with oil workers throwing money at them. She left that job and returned to San Francisco, where she joined the Fanchon and Marco vaudeville company. Al Christie saw her in those performances and signed her to appear in his film comedies. Lewis joined the chorus of The Greenwich Village Follies of 1920, and by the time the show opened, she had been named its prima donna. She became the Ziegfeld Follies' leading singer in 1921. Her schedule of singing in the Follies' midnight show gave her time during the day to study French and Italian and to study music under William Thorner. She also performed in the 1922 and 1923 editions of the Ziegfeld Follies.

Lewis performed in Europe from 1923 through 1925. She studied with Jean Périer of the Opéra-Comique in Paris, and her grand opera debut occurred when she portrayed Marguerite in a production of Faust with the Vienna Opera on October 19, 1923. She followed that performance by taking the roles of Mimì in La bohème on October 26, 1923, and Micaëla in Carmen on October 29, 1923. Her operatic debut was "a little more than one year after she had first taken up the study of grand opera". She also performed as The Merry Widow in Paris, toured England for three months, and sang in Monte Carlo. One of her performances in London in The Tales of Hoffmann resulted in such long-lasting applause that the theater's management turned the lights off until "the applause subsided so the orchestra could be heard and the opera resumed". Lewis performed in Hugh the Drover (1924) when it premiered, singing the role of Mary. Highlights from that opera were among recordings that she made for the Gramophone Company.

On November 5, 1925, the Metropolitan Opera Company announced that Lewis would sing star parts in the 1925–26 season. Plans had called for such a contract for the following season, but an offer to Lewis from the Chicago Opera Company prompted Metropolitan officials to act sooner. Her Metropolitan debut on January 28, 1926, featured her as Mimì in La bohème. Her curtain call after that debut resulted in "the throwing of bouquets, handy knots of violets, thrown from front seats all about the orchestra pit".

Following her Metropolitan Opera debut, Lewis had "an extensive concert tour" and recorded arias and songs for the Victor Talking Machine Company. Her later roles with the Metropolitan Opera included Antonia, Gilda, Guiletta, Juliet, Lauretta, Marguerite, and Thaïs. She left the organization in 1927, after her marriage.

=== Lawsuit over film contract ===
Lewis's planned second venture into films encountered an obstacle in 1931 when Pathe Studios canceled its contract with her, charging that she had violated her contract's morals clause. As a result of the cancellation, Lewis made no film for Pathe and received $2,500 of the contracted $25,000.

Lewis countered with a breach of contract suit against Pathe, asking for the remaining $22,500. The studio's response said that Lewis "had failed to conduct herself with due propriety and had become intoxicated and involved in a scandal". It also said that the scandal had diminished Lewis's popularity and "lessened her drawing ability". The response did not specify details of the accusations. It said that the $2,500 that Lewis received was a loan "to enable her to avoid being interviewed by reporters concerning the incidents."

Commenting about the suits, Lewis (who was touring Europe in opera) described herself as "a good girl" and said: "I obtained an interlocutory divorce decree recently, and I am getting my final decree in August. But ask my husband if I am immoral. He doesn't even want a divorce."

The contract initially received attention in 1930 when it was recorded on sound film — the first time such documentation was used in place of a written agreement. The subsequent conflict attracted attention from other actors because it was one of the first legal actions to enforce the morals clause that had recently become a standard part of most stars' contracts.

=== Other entertainment ===
Lewis sang in vaudeville, including a turn at the Palace Theater in Detroit in November 1930. Her performance included Strauss's "The Blue Danube" and rearranged selections from Faust.

Radio programs on which Lewis appeared included The Atwater Kent Hour on NBC and Melody Moments on the Blue Network.

In 1933, Lewis was soloist with the New York Civic Orchestra in a concert at the Brooklyn Museum. In 1934, she sang in a recital sponsored by the Brooklyn Institute of Arts and Sciences at the Academy of Music and at a concert in Paterson, New Jersey.

In 1936, Lewis sang on Ben Bernie's NBC radio program and performed at a nightclub in New York, singing two popular songs and three operatic airs.

In 1937, Lewis starred in the Concert Hall of the Air radio program, with Rosario Bourdon directing the concert orchestra. She recorded 52 electrical transcriptions.

== Recordings and book ==
Mary Lewis: The Golden Haired Soprano, a set of two compact discs (Marston 52047) was released in 2009. The set was produced by Ward Marston, and it contains "all known Lewis recordings, both acoustic and electric", including six previously unpublished numbers.

Alice Fitch Zeman wrote Mary Lewis, the Golden Haired Beauty With the Golden Voice, a biography that was published by Rose Publishing in Little Rock, Arkansas.

== Personal life and death ==
Lewis married J. Keene Lewis, her high school sweetheart, in 1915. They were divorced in 1920, and he asked her to not mention him in any publicity. She married Michael Bohnen, a bass-baritone with the Metropolitan Opera, on April 14, 1927, in New York City. That marriage ended in divorce on August 16, 1930, in Los Angeles. She later married oil company executive Robert L. Hague, who died in 1939.

Lewis died on December 31, 1941, at Le Roy Sanitarium in New York City, aged 41.
