= Jeremy Lewis (American businessman) =

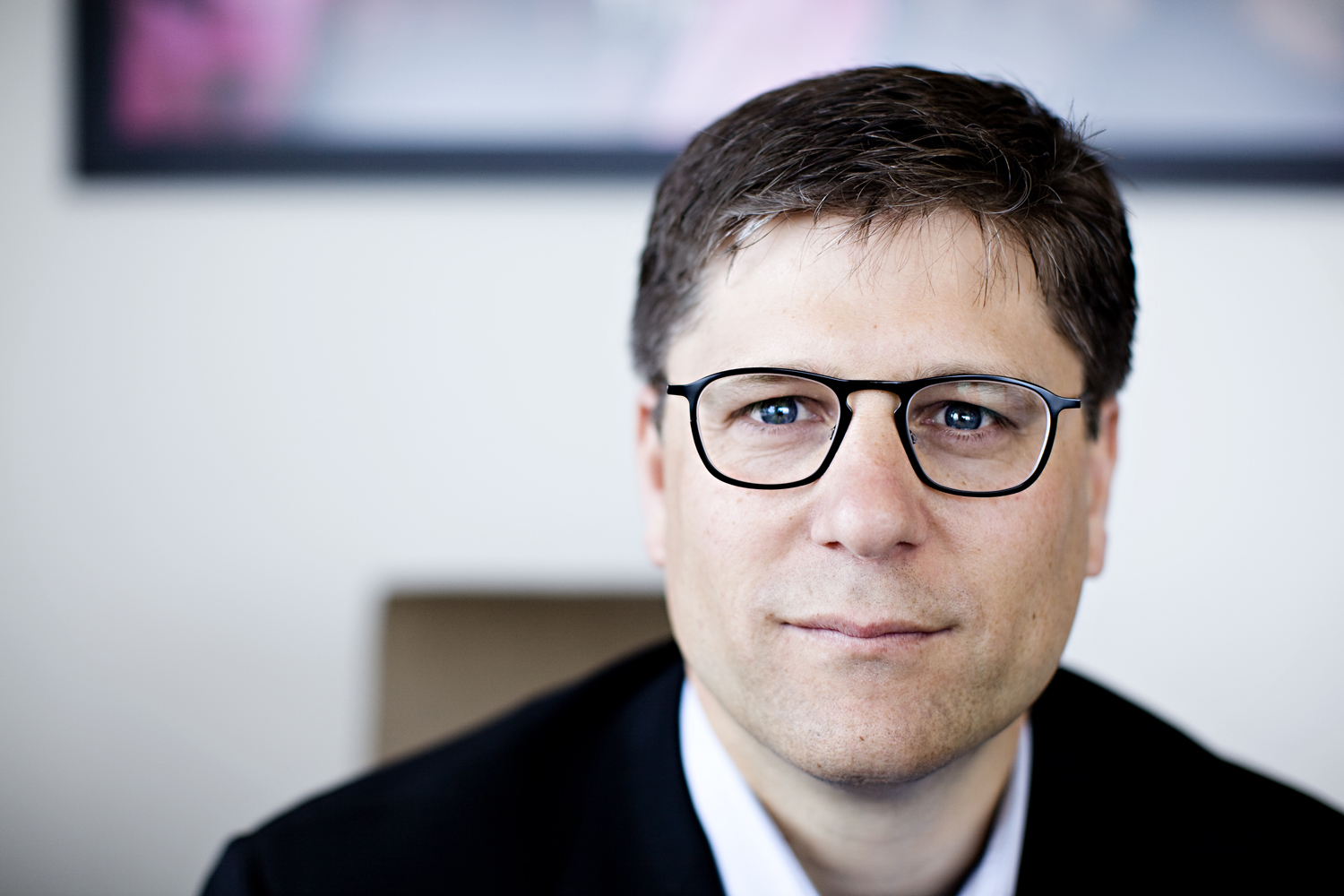
- Jeremy Lewis 2010
- Born: March 22, 1969 (age 57)
- Education: Amherst College
- Occupations: Former [President] and CEO of Big Fish Games

Peter Jeremy Lewis (born March 22, 1969) was the president and CEO of Big Fish Games, a developer, producer and distributor of casual games on a number of platforms, including PC, Mac, Facebook, iPhone, iPad and Nintendo DS. Lewis, who is known as Jeremy, graduated from Amherst College and worked as a managing director at Goldman Sachs prior to joining Big Fish Games.

== Career ==
=== Goldman Sachs ===
At Goldman Sachs, Lewis pioneered the development of Goldman Sachs Online and was co-chief operating officer of Epoch Partners, Goldman's online investment bank. Under his leadership, these businesses combined to provide Goldman with Internet retail distribution, its first customer data warehouse, and a consumer-analytics based approach to pricing, allocating and trading equity offerings. During his 14-year tenure at Goldman, Lewis also held leadership positions in international equities, capital markets, and strategic corporate development.

=== Big Fish Games ===
As president and CEO of Big Fish Games, he led the company in a first round of financing, raising $83.6 million from Balderton Capital, General Catalyst Partners, and Salmon River Capital. The common stock financing was the largest venture financing deal in Washington state that year and the biggest ever for a U.S. online gaming company. Big Fish Games was acquired for approximately $885 million by Churchill Downs (NASDAQ: CHDN) in 2014.

== Honors and awards ==
- Top 25 Innovators and Entrepreneurs of the Year, Seattle Business Times, 2009
- Finalist, Ernst & Young Entrepreneur of the Year, Pacific Northwest, 2009
- Ernst & Young Entrepreneur of the Year, Pacific Northwest, 2010
