= Jerry Lewis (disambiguation) =

Jerry Lewis (1926–2017) was an American comedian, actor, film director, screenwriter, and telethon host.

Jerry Lewis may also refer to:

== People ==
- Jerry Lewis (Arizona politician) (born 1956), Arizona State Senator
- Jerry Lewis (California politician) (1934–2021), U.S. Representative from California's 41st congressional district
- Gerald Lewis (politician) (1934–2022), known as Jerry, American politician, comptroller of the State of Florida (1975–1995)
- Jerry Lee Lewis (1935–2022), American musician, early rock and roll artist famed for Great Balls of Fire
- Nagesh (1933–2009), Indian actor and comedian in Tamil cinema, known as the "Jerry Lewis of India"

== Fictional characters ==
- Jerry Lewis, a character in the cartoon television series Totally Spies!

== See also ==
- Gary Lewis (disambiguation)
