= Esther Lewis (abolitionist) =

Pennsylvania abolitionist and farmer (1782–1848)

Esther Fussell Lewis (née Fussell; March 18, 1782 – February 8, 1848) was an American Quaker abolitionist, Underground Railroad conductor and station master, farmer, school founder, teacher, and nurse.

Lewis managed her family farm near Kimberton, Chester County, Pennsylvania.

She was a conductor of the north-south line of the Underground Railroad through Pennsylvania.

== Early life and education ==
Esther Fussell was born on March 18, 1782, in Hatboro, Pennsylvania, to Quaker minister Reverend Bartholomew Fussell and Rebekah or Rebecca Bond. She had seven siblings: Bartholomew, Solomon, Rebecca, Joseph, Jacob, Sarah, and William.

Lewis wanted to be a doctor, but found difficulty attaining a professional education due to being a woman.

Lewis would record observations of solar and lunar eclipses and the appearance of comets and meteors, and kept a weather and plant-blooming diary.

== Personal life and family ==
On September 10, 1818, Esther Fussell married John Lewis. They had four children: Elizabeth R. (1824–1863), Graceanna Lewis (1821-1912), Mariann (1819–1866), and Rebecca (1820–1893).

== Participation in the Underground Railroad ==
Lewis taught her children to be abolitionists, as their home was a “station” on the Underground Railroad.

Their home functioned as “a rehabilitation center for fugitives,” and they burned the clothes worn by people who were enslaved on southern plantations. Lewis’s children continued this work after her death.
