= James Paul Lewis Jr. =

James "Jim" Paul Lewis Jr. operated one of the largest and longest running Ponzi schemes in United States history.

Over approx. 20 years, Lewis collected around $311 million U.S. dollars from investors. He operated under the name of Financial Advisory Consultants in Lake Forest, Calif., and promised high returns. Lewis said that he was investing the money, and he even made dividend and withdrawal payments so that the scam could continue, but was instead using it to finance his own high lifestyle of fancy cars, big homes, and girlfriends.

The ploy Lewis was running was a classic "Ponzi scheme"; in this scheme, new investors contribute funds that get redistributed to earlier investors (including Lewis himself). As long as new investors keep contributing, earlier ones keep getting a return on their investment and the fraud continues. But eventually, new investors stop contributing and the whole pyramid collapses, with the later contributors getting nothing in return for their investment.

As is the case with many Ponzi schemes, Lewis relied on trust and word of mouth to help build his scheme. Many of Lewis' victims were members of churches and church-related groups, of which Lewis was reportedly a member.

In 2003, investors became suspicious when Lewis stopped paying dividends. He claimed that the Dept. of Homeland Security had frozen the funds, and this bought him some time, but eventually the FBI was after him. After a manhunt, Jim Lewis was arrested in Houston, Texas in 2004. He was brought back to California, and in 2006 was convicted and sentenced to 30 years in prison by a federal judge. Lewis was 60 years old. U.S. District Judge Cormac Carney also ordered him to pay $156 million in restitution. In imposing the statutory maximum of 30 years, Judge Carney described the scheme as a "crime against humanity" because of the harm to many elderly victims, some of whom now face a bleak future in the final years of their lives because of their having been made destitute at the hands of Mr. Lewis.

The court appointed receiver, Robb Evans, has since recovered only $11 million. Lewis has since filed an appeal but to no avail.

On December 12, 2024, Lewis's sentence was commuted by President Joe Biden to expire on December 22, 2024.
