= Transition metal complexes of 1,10-phenanthroline =

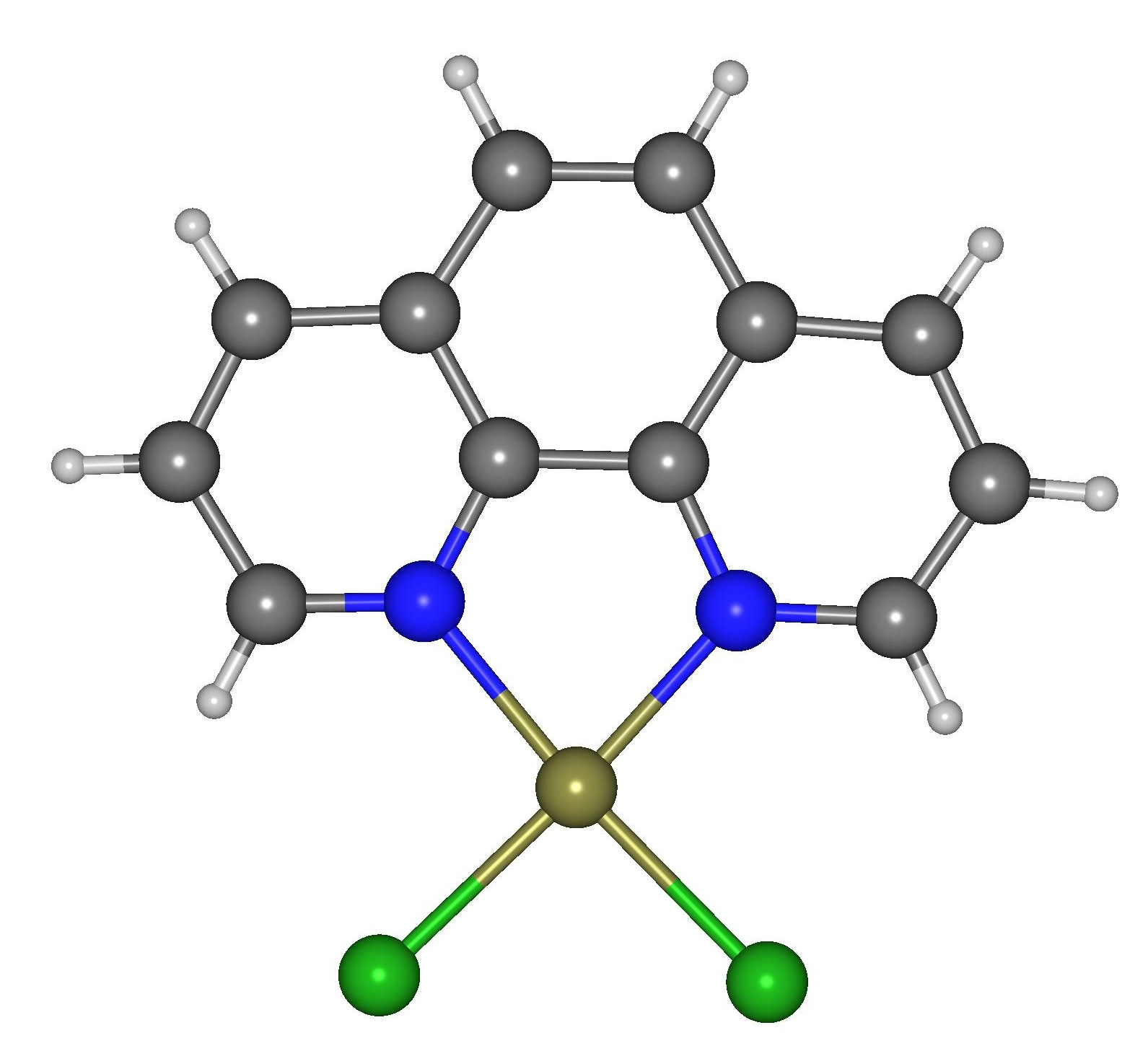
Structure of PtCl_{2}(1,10-phenanthroline). Color code: green = Cl, blue = N, gray = C.

Transition metal complexes of 1,10-phenanthroline ("phen") are coordination complexes containing one or more 1,10-phenanthroline ligands. Complexes have been described for many transition metals. In almost all complexes, phen serves as a bidentate ligand, binding metal centers with the two nitrogen atoms. Examples include PtCl_{2}(phen) and [Fe(phen)_{3}]^{2+}.

== Homoleptic complexes ==
Several homoleptic complexes are known of the type [M(phen)_{3}]^{2+}. Particularly well studied is [Fe(phen)_{3}]^{2+}, called "ferroin." It can be used for the photometric determination of Fe(II). It is used as a redox indicator with standard potential +1.06 V. The reduced ferrous form has a deep red colour and the oxidised form is light-blue. The pink complex [Ni(phen)_{3}]^{2+} has been resolved into its Δ and Λ isomers. Both [Fe(phen)_{3}]^{2+} and [Fe(phen)_{3}]^{3+} have been resolved into optical isomers.

Copper(I) forms [Cu(phen)_{2}]^{+}, which is luminescent.

== Bioinorganic chemistry ==
Structure of the metallointercalator [Ru(phen)_{2}(dppz)]^{2+} (dppz = dipyrido[3,2-a:2‘,3‘-c]phenazine).

It has long been known that some cationic metal-phen complexes intercalate into DNA. These metallointercalators associate enantioselectively and exhibit distinctive optical properties.

1,10-Phenanthroline is an inhibitor of metallopeptidases, with one of the first observed instances reported in carboxypeptidase A. Inhibition of the enzyme occurs by removal and chelation of the metal ion required for catalytic activity, leaving an inactive apoenzyme. 1,10-Phenanthroline targets mainly zinc metallopeptidases, with a much lower affinity for calcium.

== Modified phen ligands ==
A variety of substituted derivatives of phen have been examined as ligands. Substituents at the 2,9 positions confer protection for the attached metal, inhibiting the binding of multiple equivalents of the phenanthroline. Such bulky ligands also favor trigonal or tetrahedral coordination at the metal. Phen itself form complexes of the type [M(phen)_{3}]Cl_{2} when treated with metal dihalides (M = Fe, Co, Ni). By contrast, neocuproine and bathocuproine form 1:1 complexes such as [Ni(neocuproine)Cl_{2}]_{2}.

Selected 1,10-Phenanthrolines and 2,2'-Bipyridines
phen derivative	pK_{a} of conjugate acid	comment/alt. name	numbering scheme
1,10-phenanthroline	4.86	phen	Numbering for 1,10-phenanthroline derivatives.
2,2'-bipyridine	4.30	bipy	Numbering for 1,10-phenanthroline derivatives.
5-nitro-1,10-phenanthroline	3.57		Numbering for 1,10-phenanthroline derivatives.
2,9-dimethyl-1,10-phenanthroline	unknown	neocuproine	Numbering for 1,10-phenanthroline derivatives.
2,9-Dimethyl-4,7-diphenylphenanthroline	unknown	Bathocuproine	Numbering for 1,10-phenanthroline derivatives.
4,7-dimethyl-1,10-phenanthroline	5.97		Numbering for 1,10-phenanthroline derivatives.
phenanthroline-4,7-bis(4-phenylsulfonate)	-	water soluble, see tetrasodium tris(bathophenanthroline disulfonate)ruthenium(II)	Numbering for 1,10-phenanthroline derivatives.
4,7-diphenyl-1,10-phenanthroline	3.43	bathophenanthroline	Numbering for 1,10-phenanthroline derivatives.
5,6-dimethyl-1,10-phenanthroline	5.20	5,6-Me_{2}phen	Numbering for 1,10-phenanthroline derivatives.
3,4,7,8-tetramethylphenanthroline	6.31	3,4,7,8-Me_{4}phen	Numbering for 1,10-phenanthroline derivatives.
4,7-dimethoxy-1,10-phenanthroline	6.45	4,7-(MeO)_{2}phen	Numbering for 1,10-phenanthroline derivatives.
2,6-dimesitylphenanthroline	unknown	HETPHEN	

1,10-Phenanthroline-5,6-dione is a phen-type ligand incorporating an ortho-quinone group.

== Comparison with bipyridine ==
Complexes of phen and those of 2,2'-bipyridine (bipyr) are similar: the metal-ligand ensemble is planar, which facilitates electron delocalization. As a consequence of this delocalization, phen complexes often exhibit distinctive optical and redox properties. With respective pK_{a}'s of 4.86 and 4.3 for their conjugate acids, phenanthroline and bipy are of comparable basicity. In phenanthroline, the two nitrogen donors are preorganized for chelation. According to one ligand ranking scale, phen is a weaker donor than bipy.
