= C14H12N2 =

The molecular formula C_{14}H_{12}N_{2} may refer to:

- 1-Amino-3-phenylindole, a chemical compound
- Bendazol
- Neocuproine, a heterocyclic organic compound and chelating agent
