= BCP =

BCP may refer to:

== Organisations ==
- Chasseurs Alpins (Bataillon de chasseurs à pied), a battalion of French light infantry
- Bellarmine College Preparatory, a Jesuit college preparatory in San Jose, California
- Basutoland Congress Party, a Pan-Africanist and left-wing political party in Lesotho
- Botswana Congress Party, a social democratic party in Botswana
- Bulgarian Communist Party, ruled Bulgaria 1946 to 1990
- Brophy College Preparatory, a Jesuit college preparatory in Phoenix, Arizona

=== Business ===
- Banco Central del Paraguay
- Banque Centrale Populaire, a Moroccan bank
- Banco Comercial Português, a Portuguese bank, operating under the Millennium bcp brand
- Banco de Crédito del Perú, a Peruvian bank
  - Banco de Crédito de Bolivia, a Bolivian subsidiary
- Better Choice Parking, a UK airport car parking company
- BCP Telecomunicações, a former mobile phone company, now part of Claro Americas
- Business continuity planning, a process of corporate threat-modelling and ensuring corporate survival

== Science and technology ==
- Benocyclidine, a psychoactive drug and research chemical of the arylcyclohexylamine class
- Best Current Practice, a numbered subset of the RFCs published by the Internet Engineering Task Force
- Birth control pill, the combined oral contraceptive pill
- Bromochloropropane, a chemical used in RNA and DNA isolation; see acid guanidinium thiocyanate-phenol-chloroform extraction
- Bromocresol purple, a pH indicator
- Bathocuproine, a chemical reagent used in a quantum dot display
- Best current practice, a standard-like de facto, dynamic level of performance in engineering and information technology
- Bulk Copy Program, a command-line tool used to import data to or export data from various database software
- β-caryophyllene, a chemical

== Other ==
- Bangalore City Police, law enforcement agency in Bangalore, India
- Basuki Tjahaja Purnama (EYD: Basuki Cahaya Purnama; born 1966), an Indonesian politician also known by his Hakka Chinese nickname Ahok
- Book of Common Prayer, the short title of a number of related Anglican prayer books
- Boston cream pie, a round cake that is split and filled with a custard or cream filling and frosted with chocolate
- Independent Republican Party (Turkey) (Turkish: Bağımsız Cumhuriyet Partisi, a political party in Turkey
- Bournemouth, Christchurch and Poole, a local government area in England
- Blueprint Culture and Creative Park, an event venue in Tainan, Taiwan
- The Booster Course Pass, an expansion to the video game Mario Kart 8 Deluxe
- Boolean constraint propagation, a logical procedure used by SAT solvers
