= C12H6N2O2 =

The molecular formula C_{12}H_{6}N_{2}O_{2} may refer to:

- Phanquinone
- 1,10-Phenanthroline-5,6-dione
