= Bathophenanthroline =

Names
- IUPAC name 4,7-diphenyl-1,10-phenanthroline
- Other names: 1,10-Bathophenanthroline; 4,7-Diphenyl-1,10-diazaphenanthrene; 4,7-Diphenyl-o-phenanthroline; Bphen

Identifiers
CAS Number	1662-01-7
3D model (JSmol)	Interactive image
ChEBI	CHEBI:77995
ChEMBL	ChEMBL583162
ChemSpider	65648
ECHA InfoCard	100.015.244
EC Number	216-767-1
PubChem CID	72812
UNII	4A2B091F0G
CompTox Dashboard (EPA)	DTXSID7061857
- InChI: InChI=1S/C24H16N2/c1-3-7-17(8-4-1)19-13-15-25-23-21(19)11-12-22-20(14-16-26-24(22)23)18-9-5-2-6-10-18/h1-16H Key: DHDHJYNTEFLIHY-UHFFFAOYSA-N
- SMILES: C1=CC=C(C=C1)C2=C3C=CC4=C(C=CN=C4C3=NC=C2)C5=CC=CC=C5

Properties
Chemical formula	C_{24}H_{16}N_{2}
Molar mass	332.406 g·mol^{−1}
Appearance	white solid
Melting point	180 °C (356 °F; 453 K)

Hazards
- GHS labelling
Pictograms	(GHS07: Exclamation mark)
Signal word	Warning
Hazard statements	H315, H319, H335
Precautionary statements	P261, P264, P264+P265, P271, P280, P302+P352, P304+P340, P305+P351+P338, P319, P321, P332+P317, P337+P317, P362+P364, P403+P233, P405, P501
- Except where otherwise noted, data are given for materials in their standard state (at 25 °C [77 °F], 100 kPa). Infobox references

Bathophenanthroline is a heterocyclic organic compound with the formula (C_{6}H_{5})_{2}C_{12}H_{6}N_{2}. It is a derivative of 1,10-phenanthroline (C_{12}H_{8}N_{2}) with phenyl groups located at the 4 and 7 position. It is common bidentate ligand, forming a significant subset of transition metal complexes of 1,10-phenanthrolines. Many of these complexes have distinctive optical properties.
