= Lutetium acetylacetonate =

Names
- IUPAC name Tris(acetylacetonato)lutetium(III)
- Systematic IUPAC name Tris[(Z)-4-oxopent-2-en-2-olato-κ^{2}O,O′]lutetium(III)

Identifiers
CAS Number	17966-84-6
3D model (JSmol)	Interactive image
- InChI: InChI=1S/3C5H7O2.Lu/c3*1-4(6)3-5(2)7;/h3*3H,1-2H3;/q3*-1;+3 Key: HXFHOORFYPCGNF-UHFFFAOYSA-N
- SMILES: CC(=O)[CH-]C(=O)C.CC(=O)[CH-]C(=O)C.CC(=O)[CH-]C(=O)C.[Lu+3]

Properties
Chemical formula	C_{15}H_{21}LuO_{6}
Molar mass	472.294 g·mol^{−1}
- Except where otherwise noted, data are given for materials in their standard state (at 25 °C [77 °F], 100 kPa). Infobox references

Lutetium acetylacetonate is a coordination compound with the chemical formula Lu(C_{5}H_{7}O_{2})_{3}, or Lu(acac)_{3} for short. The complex per se is unlikely to exist, but the dihydrate would be expected based on the behavior of other lanthanide tris(acetylacetonate)s. Consistent with this scenario, It forms adducts Lu(acac)_{3}(phen) and Lu(acac)_{3}(dipy) where phen and bipy are 1,10-phenanthroline and 2,2'-bipyridine, respectively.

The complex is somewhat volatile. It can be prepared by the reaction of trialkoxylutetium and acetylacetone.
