= Park and ride =

Car park with public transport connections

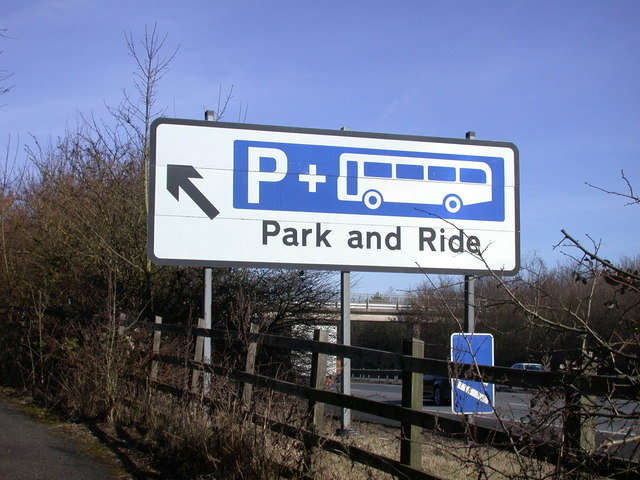
A road sign for park and ride in Cambridge, United Kingdom

Standard park and ride sign in the United States

A park and ride, also known as a commuter lot, is a parking lot with public transport connections that allows commuters and other people heading to city centres to leave their vehicles and transfer to a bus, rail system (rapid transit, light rail, or commuter rail), or carpool for the remainder of the journey. The vehicle is left in the parking lot during the day and retrieved when the owner returns. Park and rides are generally located in the suburbs of metropolitan areas or on the outer edges of large cities. A park and ride that only offers parking for meeting a carpool and not connections to public transport may also be called a park and pool.

Park and ride is abbreviated as "P+R" on road signs in some countries, and is often styled as "Park & Ride" in marketing.

== Adoption ==
In Sweden, a tax has been introduced on the benefit of free or cheap parking paid by an employer, if workers would otherwise have to pay. The tax has reduced the number of workers driving into the inner city, and increased the usage of park and ride areas, especially in Stockholm. The introduction of a congestion tax in Stockholm has further increased the usage of park and ride.

In Prague, park and ride parking lots are established near some metro and railway stations (about 17 parks near 12 metro stations and 3 train stations, in 2011). These parking lots offer low prices and all-day and return (2× 75 min) tickets including the public transport fare.

== Benefits ==
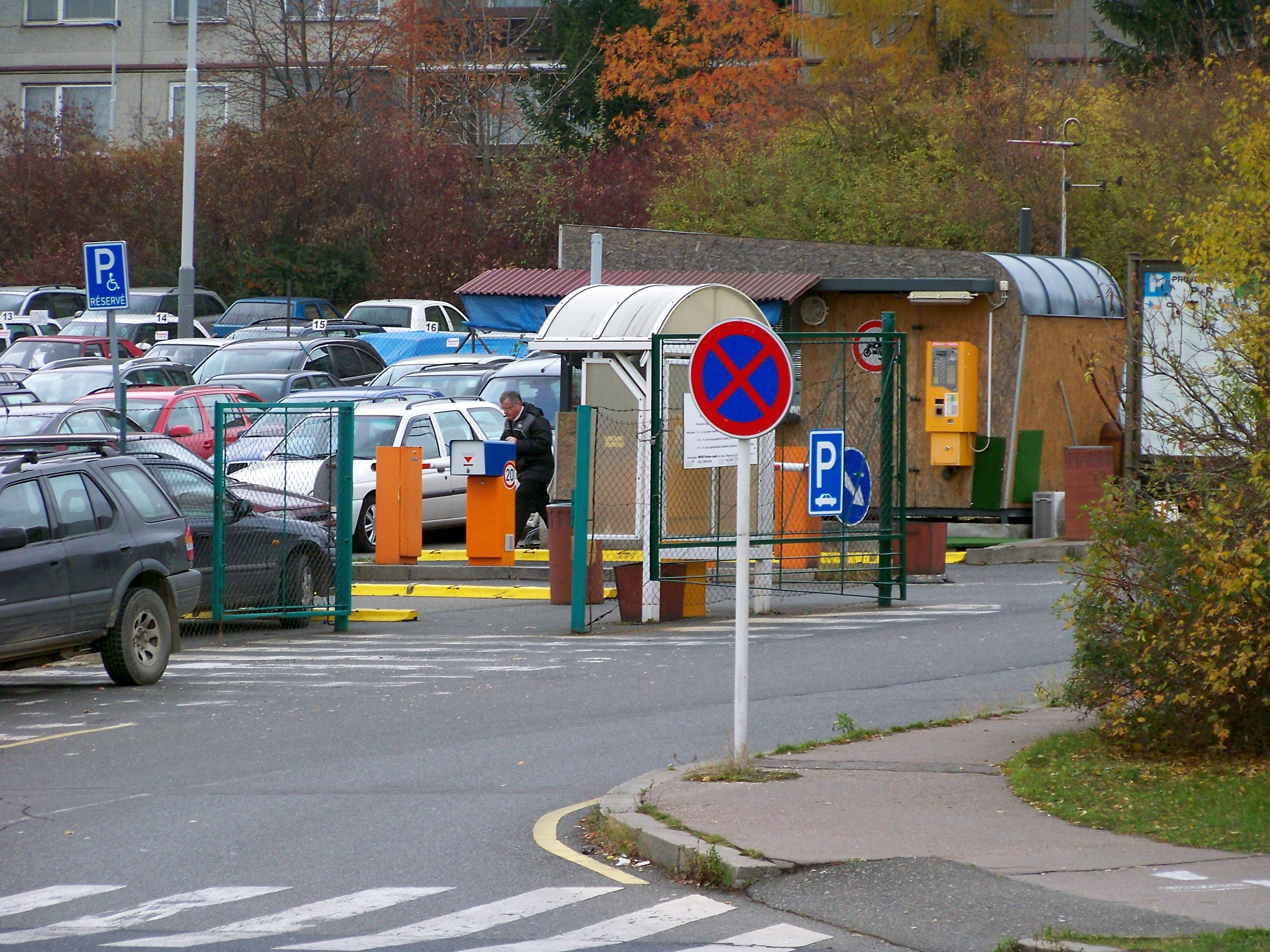
Park and ride parking lot in Prague-Opatov near the metro station, with a ticket machine offering integrated fare

Park and ride facilities allow commuters to avoid a stressful drive along congested roads and a search for scarce, expensive city-centre parking. They may well reduce congestion by assisting the use of public transport in congested urban areas.

There is not much research on the pros and cons of park and ride schemes. It has been suggested that there is "a lack of clear-cut evidence for park and ride's widely assumed impact in reducing congestion".

Park and ride facilities help commuters who live beyond practical walking distance from the railway station or bus stop. They may also suit commuters with alternative fuel vehicles, which often have reduced range, when the facility is closer to home than the ultimate destination. They also are useful as a fixed meeting place for those carsharing, carpooling, or using "kiss and ride" (see below). Also, some transit operators use park and ride facilities to encourage more efficient driving practices by reserving parking spaces for low emission designs, high-occupancy vehicles, or carsharing.

Many park and rides have passenger waiting areas and/or toilets. Travel information, such as leaflets and posters, may be provided. At larger facilities, extra services such as a travel office, food shop, car wash, or cafeteria may be provided. These are often encouraged by municipal operators to encourage use of park and ride.

== Bus park and rides ==
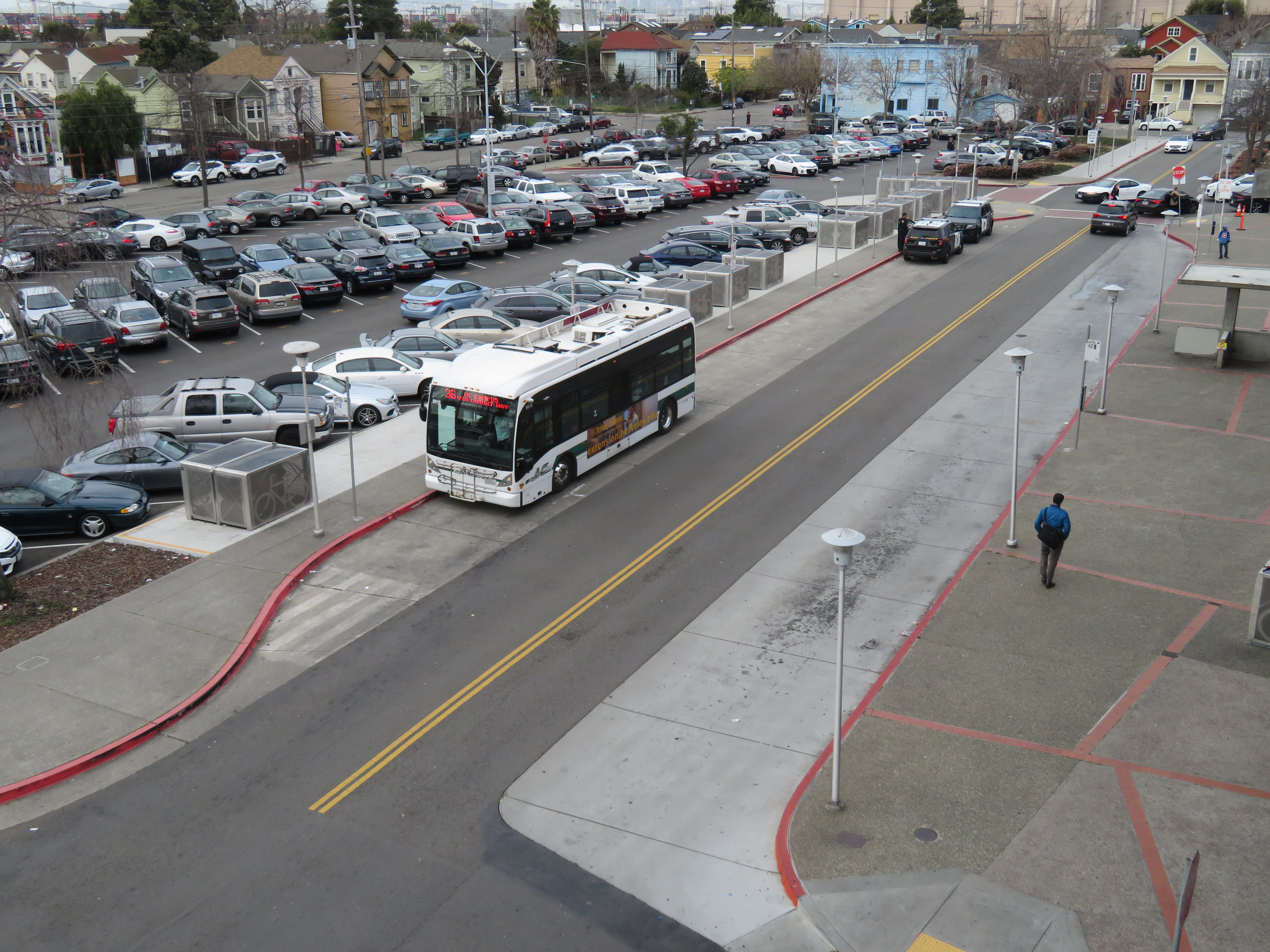
An AC Transit bus at the West Oakland station park and ride in 2018

Park and ride facilities, with dedicated parking lots and bus services, began in the 1960s in the UK. Oxford operated the first such scheme, initially with an experimental service operating part-time from a motel on the A34 in the 1960s and then on a full-time basis from 1973. Better Choice Parking first offered an airport park and ride service at London Gatwick Airport in 1978. Oxford now operates park and ride from 5 dedicated parking lots around the city. As of 2015, Oxford has the biggest urban park & ride network in the UK with a combined capacity of 5,031 car parking spaces.

== Railway park and rides ==
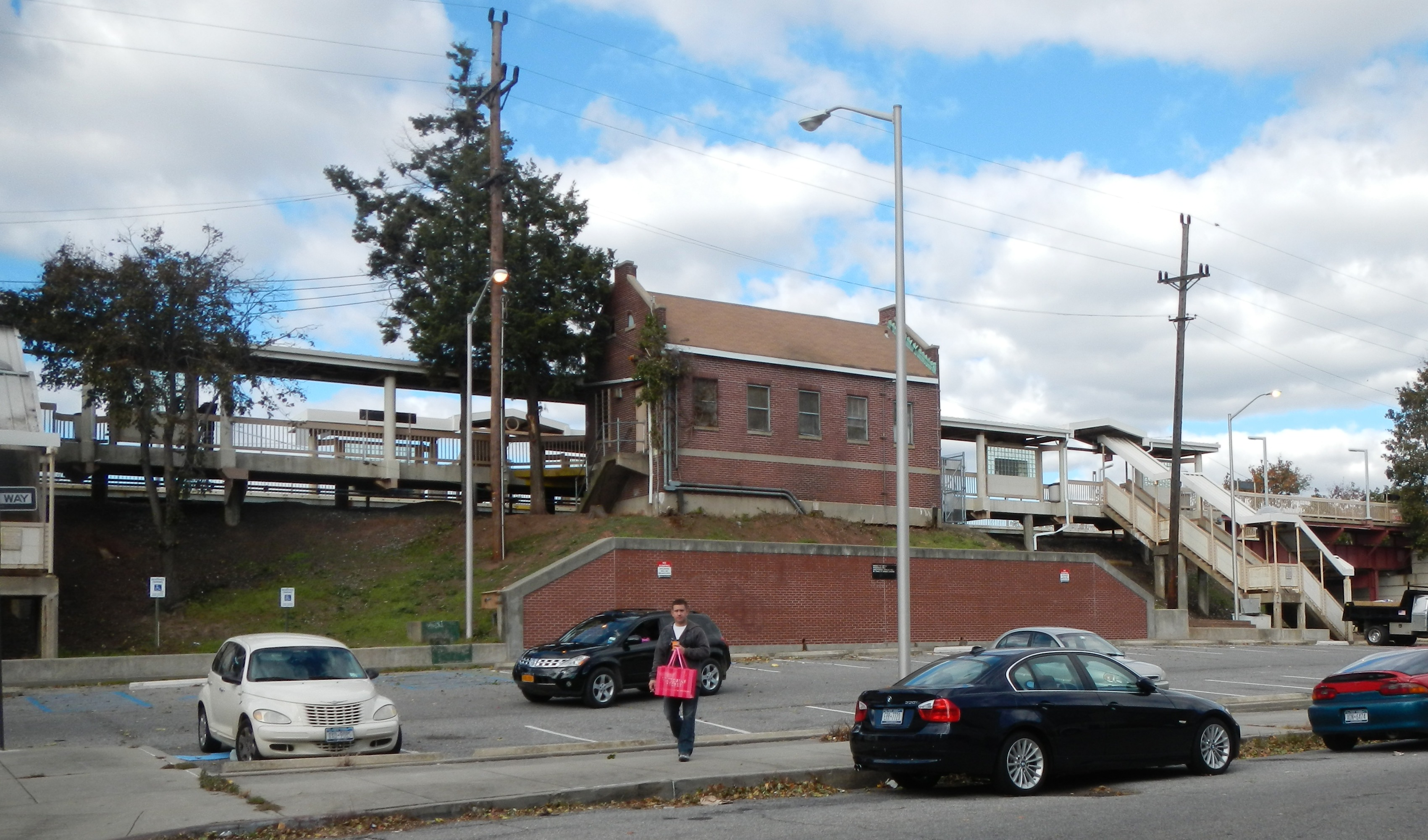
Park and ride lot adjacent to the Dongan Hills station in Staten Island, New York City

Some railway stations are promoted as park and ride facilities for towns a few miles away, for instance Liskeard for Looe and St Erth for St Ives, both in Cornwall, England, and Norden for Swanage, Dorset, England (by steam railway). These help relieve traffic congestion and parking problems in the town. In contrast, some stations act as a railhead, easily accessed by road, for long-distance traffic. Names of stations in the UK with large car parks outside the main urban area are often suffixed with "Parkway", such as Bristol Parkway, Tiverton Parkway, and Oxford Parkway. At Luton Airport Parkway and Southampton Airport Parkway, the stations are there to serve air as well as road passengers.

In the United States, it is common for outlying rail stations to include automobile parking, often with hundreds of spaces.

== Bike and ride ==
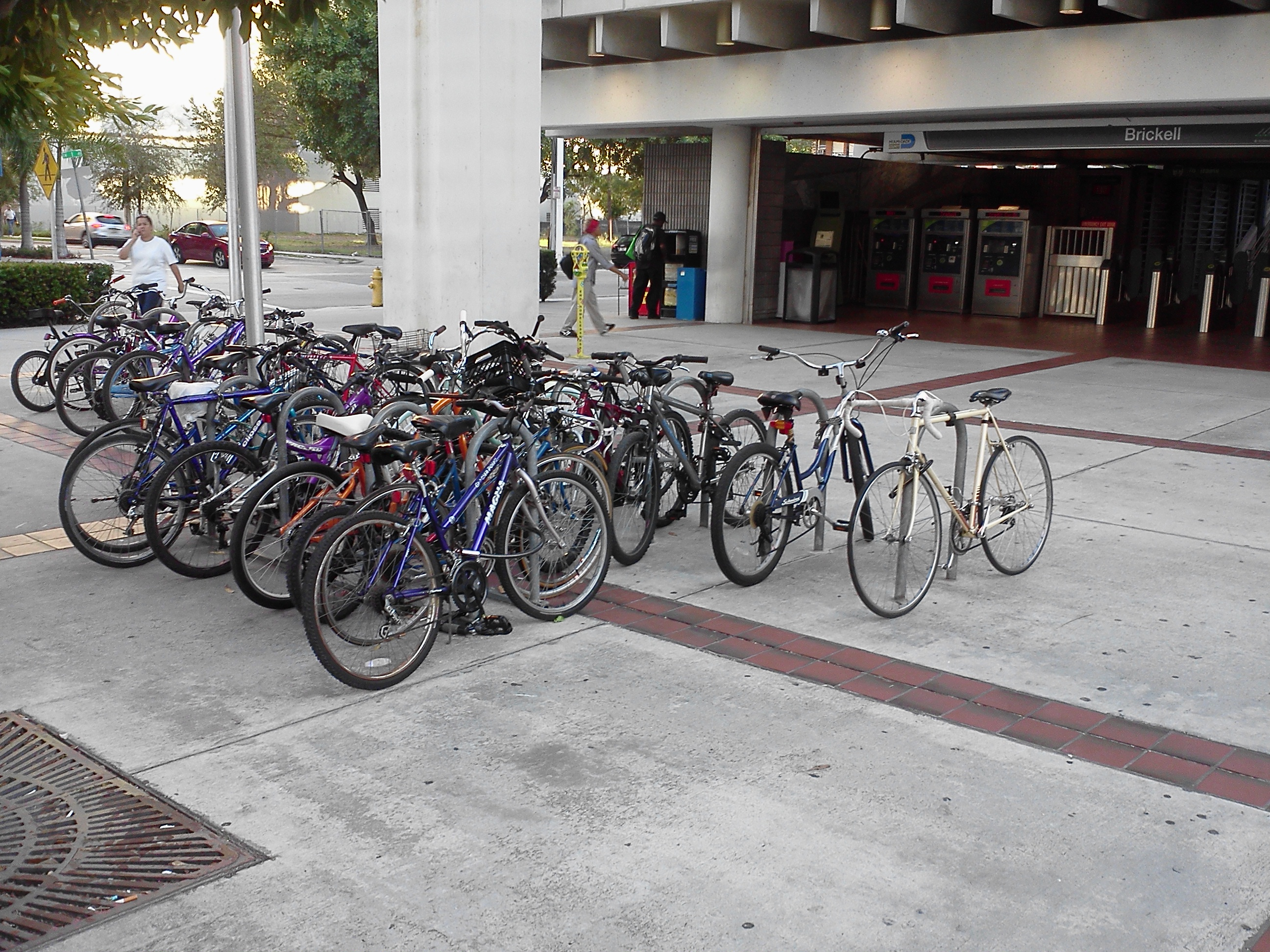
A busy bike-and-ride facility at a Miami Metrorail station

B & R (B + R) is a name for using cycle boxes or racks near public transport terminals, mostly together with P & R parking lots. This system can be promoted through integrated fare and tickets with public transport system.

== Kiss and ride / kiss and fly ==
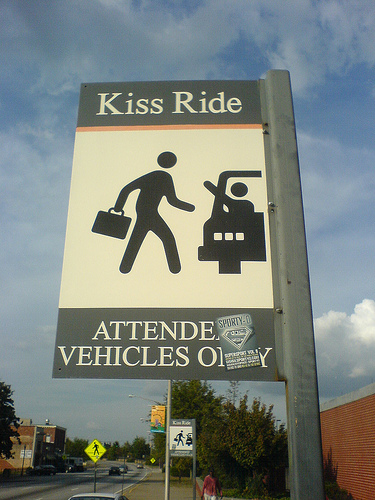
Kiss-and-ride sign at a MARTA rail station

Many railway stations and airports feature a "kiss-and-ride" or "kiss-and-fly" area in which cars can stop briefly to discharge or, less commonly, pick up passengers. The term first appeared in a 20 January 1956 report in the Los Angeles Times. It refers to the nominal scenario whereby a passenger is driven to the station by spouse or partner, then they kiss each other goodbye before the passenger catches the train.

Deutsche Bahn has announced that it will be changing the English expressions for Kiss and Ride, Service Points and Counters to German ones. In Italy the new Bologna Centrale railway station uses "kiss and ride" signs. Some high-speed railway stations in Taiwan have signs outside stations reading "Kiss and Ride" in English, with Chinese characters above the words that read "temporary pick-up and drop-off zone". Kiss and Rides are getting popular in Poland. Cities with such areas include Wrocław (since October 2011), Kraków (since 15 November 2013), Warsaw (since 2016), and Toruń (since 2016). Locally they are known by their English name, i.e. "Kiss and ride" and while the sign is non-standardized, all of them contain the letters K+R. In the Netherlands, many English terms appear in the Dutch language, and "Kiss & Ride" is one of them.

== Car-share park and rides ==
Park and ride schemes do not necessarily involve public transport. They can be provided to reduce the number of cars on the road by promoting carpooling, vanpooling, and carsharing. Partly because of the concentration of riders, and thus a reduced number of vehicles, these park and ride terminals often have express transit services into the urban area, such as a high-occupancy vehicle lane. The service may take passengers in only one direction in the morning (typically towards a central business district) and in the opposite direction in the evening, with no or a limited number of trips available in the middle of the day. It is often not allowed to park at these locations overnight. These attributes vary from region to region, reflecting local transportation policies and commuter needs.

== See also ==
- List of park and rides in Greater Montreal
- Park and ride bus services in the United Kingdom
