= Tetrasodium tris(bathophenanthroline disulfonate)ruthenium(II) =

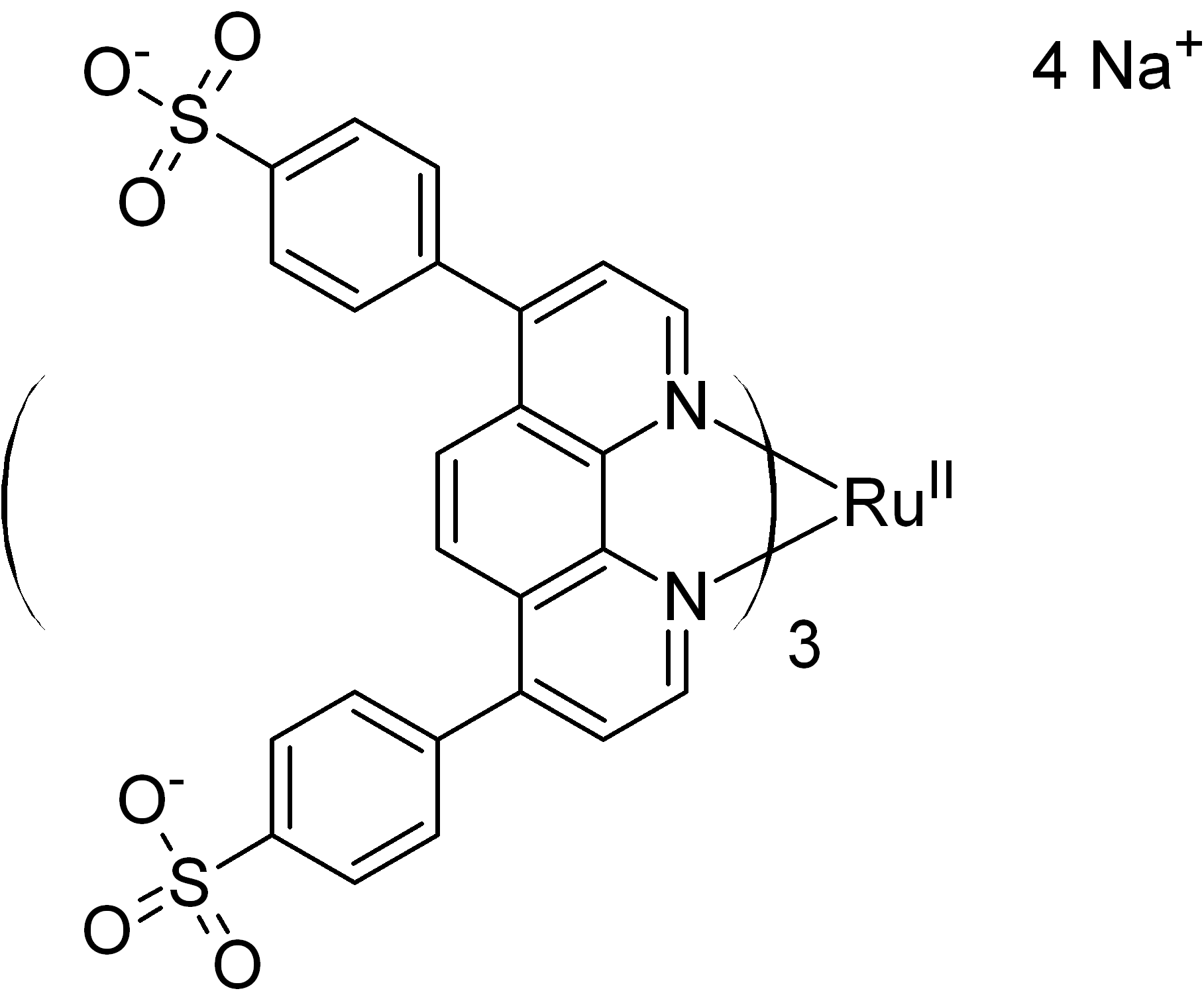

Identifiers
CAS Number	301206-84-8
3D model (JSmol)	Interactive image
ECHA InfoCard	100.120.143
EC Number	608-445-8
- InChI: InChI=1S/3C24H16N2O6S2.4Na.Ru/c3*27-33(28,29)17-5-1-15(2-6-17)19-11-13-25-23-21(19)9-10-22-20(12-14-26-24(22)23)16-3-7-18(8-4-16)34(30,31)32;;;;;/h3*1-14H,(H,27,28,29)(H,30,31,32);;;;;/q;;;4*+1;+2/p-6 Key: AXMFYAOBYBXMLC-UHFFFAOYSA-H
- SMILES: C1=CC(=CC=C1C2=C3C=CC4=C(C=CN=C4C3=NC=C2)C5=CC=C(C=C5)S(=O)(=O)[O-])S(=O)(=O)[O-].C1=CC(=CC=C1C2=C3C=CC4=C(C=CN=C4C3=NC=C2)C5=CC=C(C=C5)S(=O)(=O)[O-])S(=O)(=O)[O-].C1=CC(=CC=C1C2=C3C=CC4=C(C=CN=C4C3=NC=C2)C5=CC=C(C=C5)S(=O)(=O)[O-])S(=O)(=O)[O-].[Na+].[Na+].[Na+].[Na+].[Ru+2]

Properties
Chemical formula	C_{72}H_{42}N_{6}Na_{4}O_{18}RuS_{6}
Molar mass	1664.54 g·mol^{−1}
- Except where otherwise noted, data are given for materials in their standard state (at 25 °C [77 °F], 100 kPa). verify (what is ?) Infobox references

Tetrasodium tris(bathophenanthroline disulfonate)ruthenium(II) (Na_{4}Ru(bps)_{3}) is a sodium salt of coordination complex. In this form, it is the salt of a sulfonic acid. This compound or related salts are classified as transition metal complexes of 1,10-phenanthroline. Ruthenium(II) tris(bathophenanthroline disulfonate), referring to the anionic fragment, is used as a protein dye in biochemistry to differentiate and detect proteins. In 2-D electrophoresis the complex is used in a standard procedure to separate complex protein mixtures in proteome studies (Proteomics). and a step in gene expression profiling.

For protein detection, it is advantageous to use fluorescent labels containing chromophores that have longer excitation wavelength and emission wavelength than the aromatic amino acids. These dyes combine good signal to background ratio (contrast), broad linear dynamic range, broad application range, photochemical stability, and compatibility to protein identification techniques, e.g. mass spectrometry (MS) or Western blotting.

== History ==
Tris(bathophenanthroline disulfonate)ruthenium(II) was synthesized by Bannwarth as a dye for oligo nucleotides. Within 5 years, similar transition metal complexes had been recognized as workable protein detection reagents, and shortly afterwards the europium analog of RuBPS was demonstrated as an effective fluorescent protein detection reagent. The first reported use of RuBPS for protein detection appears to be the commercial release of the proprietary Sypro Ruby protein staining solution in 1999. While Sypro Ruby is proprietary & is not stated to have RuBPS as the major component, it is stated to have ruthenium, and Rabilloud et al. synthesized RuPBS and compared it to Sypro Ruby, finding them to be highly similar, albeit not identical, reagents for fluorescent detection of proteins in polyacrylamide gels. Notably, Rabilloud et al. made their comparisons against the first formulation of Sypro Ruby, the second (and presumed current) formulation of Sypro Ruby has the same product numbers (but distinct lot numbers) and an increased performance with diverse fixative solutions. The fact that RuBPS is not only easy to synthesize but also easy to handle, induced further developments in this field.

RuBPS staining protocol by selectively destaining the polyacrylamide matrix while the protein content remained tinctured. This technique offers a variety of advantages. Related ruthenium(II) complexes have some improved properties, specifically a broader pH range where they could be used.
