= Ferroin =

Complex of Fe^{2+} by ortho-phenanthroline

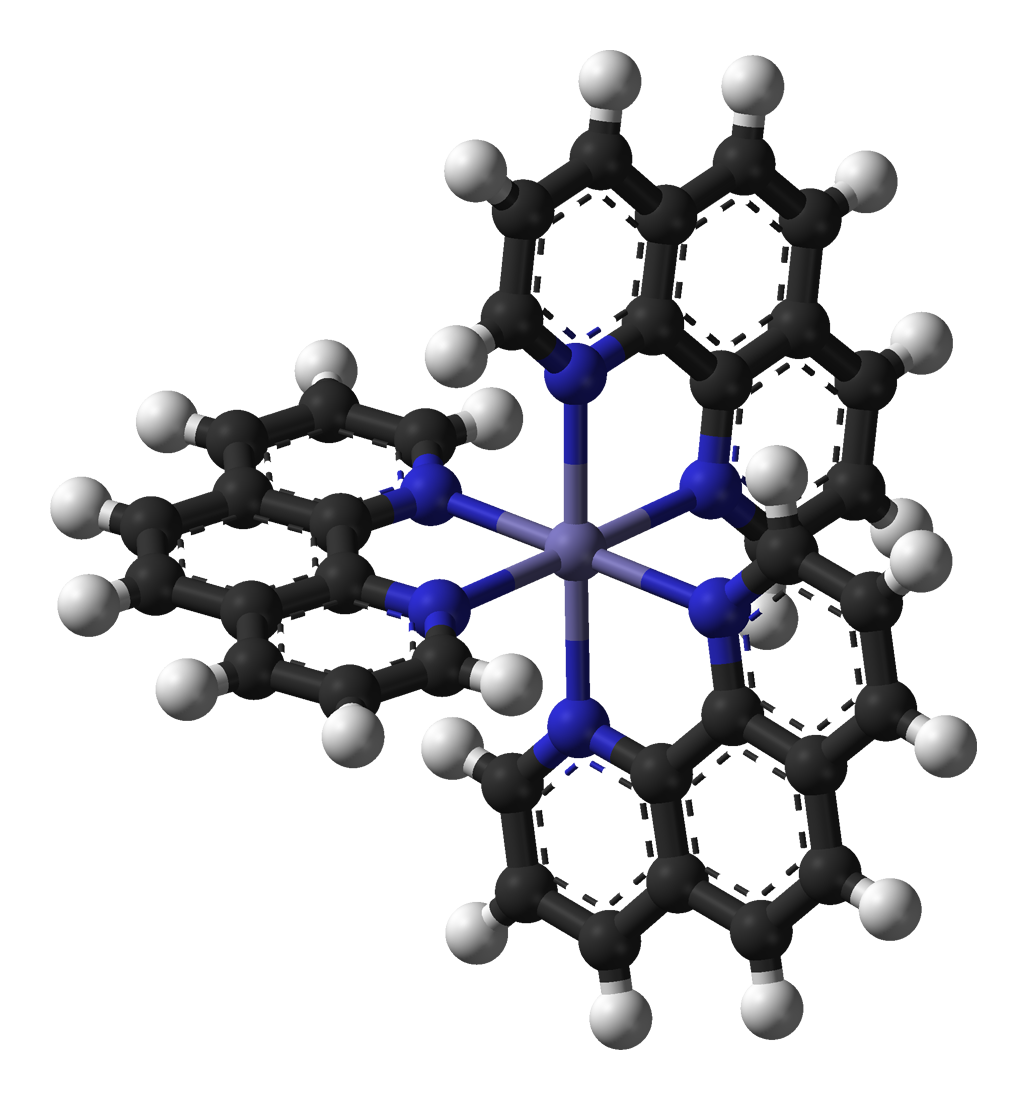
- The structure of the [Fe(o-phen)_{3}]^{2+} complex cation in ferroin

Identifiers
CAS Number	14634-91-4
3D model (JSmol)	Interactive image
ChemSpider	76289
ECHA InfoCard	100.035.145
PubChem CID	84567
UNII	YP88WTW2E4
CompTox Dashboard (EPA)	DTXSID00163588
- InChI: InChI=1S/3C12H8N2.Fe.H2O4S/c3*1-3-9-5-6-10-4-2-8-14-12(10)11(9)13-7-1;;1-5(2,3)4/h3*1-8H;;(H2,1,2,3,4)/q;;;+2;/p-2 Key: CIWXFRVOSDNDJZ-UHFFFAOYSA-L; InChI=1/3C12H8N2.Fe.H2O4S/c3*1-3-9-5-6-10-4-2-8-14-12(10)11(9)13-7-1;;1-5(2,3)4/h3*1-8H;;(H2,1,2,3,4)/q;;;+2;/p-2 Key: CIWXFRVOSDNDJZ-NUQVWONBAU
- SMILES: c12c3[n+]4cccc3ccc2ccc[n+]1[Ru-4]456(c7cccc(c78)ccc(c78)ccc[n+]67)[n+]1cccc2ccc3ccc[n+1]5c3c12

Properties
Chemical formula	C_{36}H_{24}FeN_{6}^{2+}
Molar mass	596.27 g/mol

Hazards
- GHS labelling
Pictograms	(GHS06: Toxic) (GHS07: Exclamation mark) (GHS09: Environmental hazard)
Signal word	Danger
Hazard statements	H301, H302, H410, H412
Precautionary statements	P264, P270, P273, P301+P316, P301+P317, P321, P330, P391, P405, P501
Threshold limit value (TLV)	1.0 mg/m^{3}, as Fe
- Except where otherwise noted, data are given for materials in their standard state (at 25 °C [77 °F], 100 kPa). verify (what is ?) Infobox references

Ferroin, also known as tris(o-phenanthroline)iron(II), is the chemical compound with the formula [Fe(o-phen)_{3}], where o-phen is the abbreviation of ortho-phenanthroline for 1,10-phenanthroline, a bidentate ligand. The term "ferroin" is used loosely and includes salts of other anions such as chloride. Ferroin is one of many transition metal complexes of 1,10-phenanthroline.

== Structure ==
Many salts of [Fe(o-phen)_{3}]^{2+} have been characterized by X-ray crystallography. The structures of [Fe(o-phen)_{3}]^{2+} and [Fe(o-phen)_{3}]^{3+} are almost identical, consistent with both being low-spin. These cations are octahedral with D_{3} symmetry group. The Fe-N distances are 197.3 pm.

== Preparation and reactions ==
Ferroin sulfate can be prepared by combining phenanthroline to ferrous sulfate dissolved in water:

3 phen + Fe^{2+} → [Fe(phen)_{3}]^{2+}

The oxidation of this complex from Fe(II) to Fe(III), involving the fast and reversible transfer of only one electron, makes it a useful redox indicator in aqueous solution:

[Fe(phen)_{3}]^{2+} → [Fe(phen)_{3}]^{3+} + 1 e^{−} (E_{h} = +1.06 V)

Addition of sulfuric acid to an aqueous solution of [Fe(phen)_{3}]^{2+} causes its hydrolysis and the formation of a neutral ion pair [phenH]HSO_{4}:

[Fe(phen)_{3}]^{+}_{2} + 3 H_{2}SO_{4} + 6 H_{2}O → [Fe(OH_{2})_{6}]^{+}_{2} + 3 [phenH]^{+}HSO_{_{4}}^{−}

Addition of cyanide to an aqueous solution of [Fe(phen)_{3}]SO_{4} precipitates Fe(phen)_{2}(CN)_{2}.

== Redox indicator ==
o-Phenanthroline Fe(II) (Redox indicator)
E^{0}= +1.06 V
Reduced.
↔
Oxidized

This complex is used as an indicator in analytical chemistry. The active ingredient is the [Fe(o-phen)_{3}]^{2+} ion, which is a chromophore that can be oxidized to the ferric derivative [Fe(o-phen)_{3}]^{3+}. The potential for this redox change is +1.06 volts in 1 M H_{2}SO_{4}. It is a popular redox indicator for visualizing oscillatory Belousov–Zhabotinsky reactions.

Ferroin is suitable as a redox indicator, as the color change is reversible, very pronounced and rapid, and the ferroin solution is stable up to 60 °C. It is the main indicator used in cerimetry.

Nitroferroin, the complex of iron(II) with 5-nitro-1,10-phenanthroline, has a transition potential of +1.25 volt. It is more stable than ferroin, but in sulfuric acid with Ce^{4+} ion, it requires a significant excess of titrant. It is, however, useful for titration in perchloric acid or nitric acid solution, where the cerium redox potential is higher.

The redox potential of the iron-phenanthroline complex can be varied between +0.84 V and +1.10 V by adjusting the position and number of methyl groups on the phenanthroline core.

== Fe^{2+} direct UV-visible spectrophotometric determination ==
In analytical chemistry, the red color specific for the reduced form of ferroin was once used for the direct UV-visible spectrophotometric determination of Fe^{2+}. The maximum absorbance of the Fe(II) o-phenanthroline complex is at 511 nm. However, another related N-ligand called ferrozine (3-(2-pyridyl)-5,6-diphenyl-1,2,4-triazine-p,p′-disulfonic acid monosodium salt hydrate) is also used and must not be confused with ferroin. Ferrozine was specifically synthesised in the 1970s to obtain a less expensive reagent for automated chemical analysis. Ferrozine reacts with Fe^{2+} to form a relatively stable magenta-colored complex with a maximum absorbance at 562 nm. The ferrozine method allows the determination of Fe(II)/Fe(III) speciation in natural fresh or marine waters at the submicromolar level.

In 2021, Smith et al. reexamined the formation kinetics and stability of ferroin and ferrozine Fe(II) complexes. They have found that while the kinetics of Fe^{2+} binding by o-phenanthroline are very fast, the kinetics of Fe^{2+} complexation by ferrozine depend on ligand concentration. An excess ligand concentration provides a more stable absorbance, while the formation of Fe(II) complexes is pH-independent.

== Related complexes ==
- Tris(bipyridine)iron(II)
- Tris(bipyridine)ruthenium(II)
