= Neocuproine =

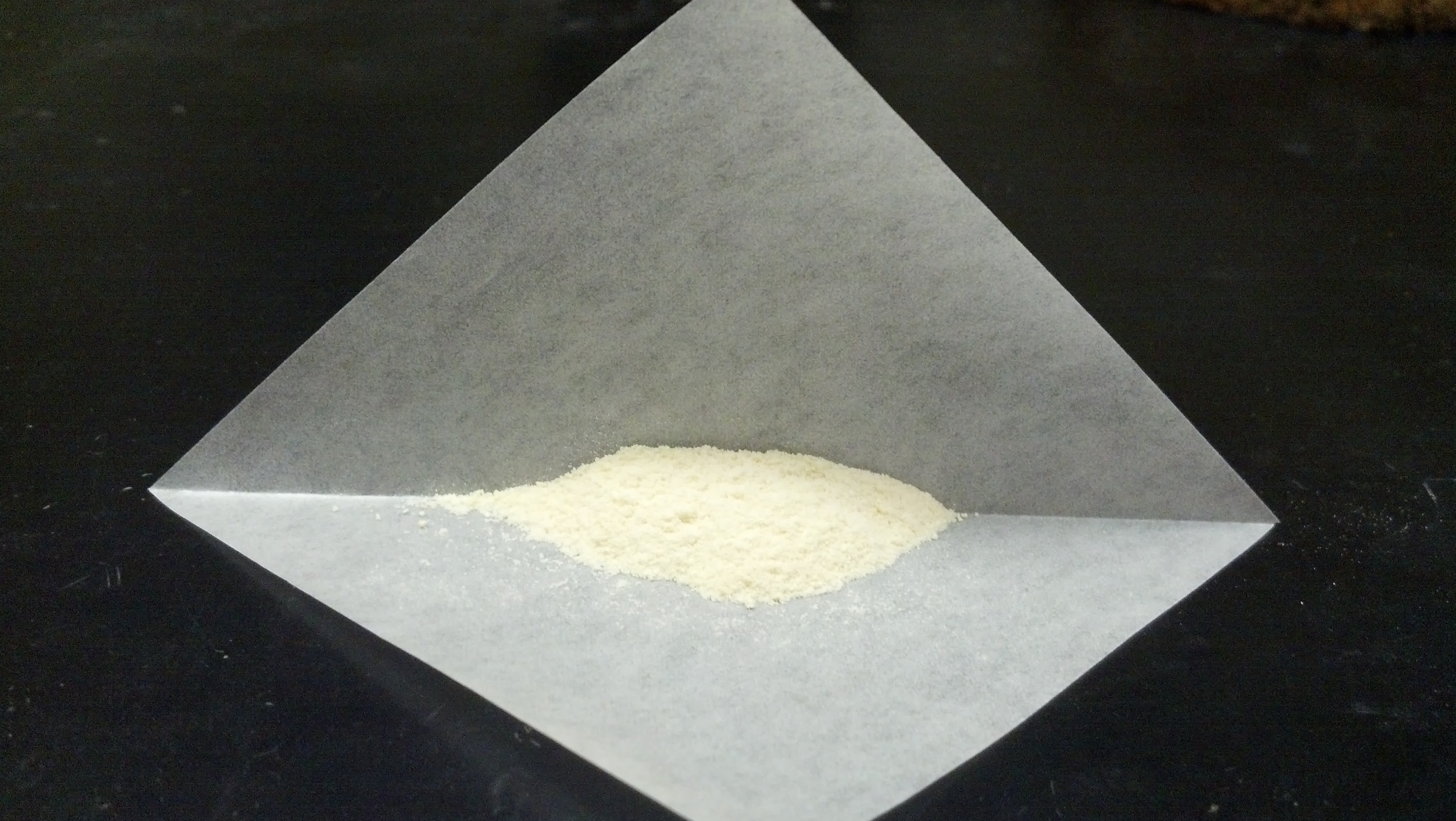

- Neocuproine

Names
- Preferred IUPAC name 2,9-Dimethyl-1,10-phenanthroline

Identifiers
CAS Number	484-11-7
3D model (JSmol)	Interactive image
ChEBI	CHEBI:91222
ChemSpider	58734
ECHA InfoCard	100.006.911
EC Number	207-601-9
PubChem CID	65237
UNII	8E7D2SH3BV
CompTox Dashboard (EPA)	DTXSID5060065
- InChI: InChI=1S/C14H12N2/c1-9-3-5-11-7-8-12-6-4-10(2)16-14(12)13(11)15-9/h3-8H,1-2H3 Key: IYRGXJIJGHOCFS-UHFFFAOYSA-N; InChI=1/C14H12N2/c1-9-3-5-11-7-8-12-6-4-10(2)16-14(12)13(11)15-9/h3-8H,1-2H3 Key: IYRGXJIJGHOCFS-UHFFFAOYAL
- SMILES: n1c3c(ccc1C)ccc2ccc(nc23)C

Properties
Chemical formula	C_{14}H_{12}N_{2}
Molar mass	208.264 g·mol^{−1}
Appearance	Pale yellow solid
Melting point	162 to 164 °C (324 to 327 °F; 435 to 437 K)
Solubility in water	Slightly soluble
Solubility	Ethanol, Acetone, Ether, Benzene, Light Petroleum (slightly)
- Except where otherwise noted, data are given for materials in their standard state (at 25 °C [77 °F], 100 kPa). verify (what is ?) Infobox references

Neocuproine is a heterocyclic organic compound and chelating agent. Phenanthroline ligands were first published in the late 19th century, and the derivatives substituted at the 2 and 9 positions are among the most studied of the modified phenanthrolines.

== Synthesis and structure ==
Neocuproine can be prepared by sequential Skraup reactions (Doebner-Miller reaction/condensation) of o-nitroaniline (2-Nitroaniline) with crotonaldehyde diacetate. An alternate synthesis involves the condensation of o-phenylenediamine, m-nitrobenzenesulphonate, and crotonaldehyde diacetate. This method gives higher yields but is less economical. Neocuproine crystallizes as a dihydrate and a hemihydrate.

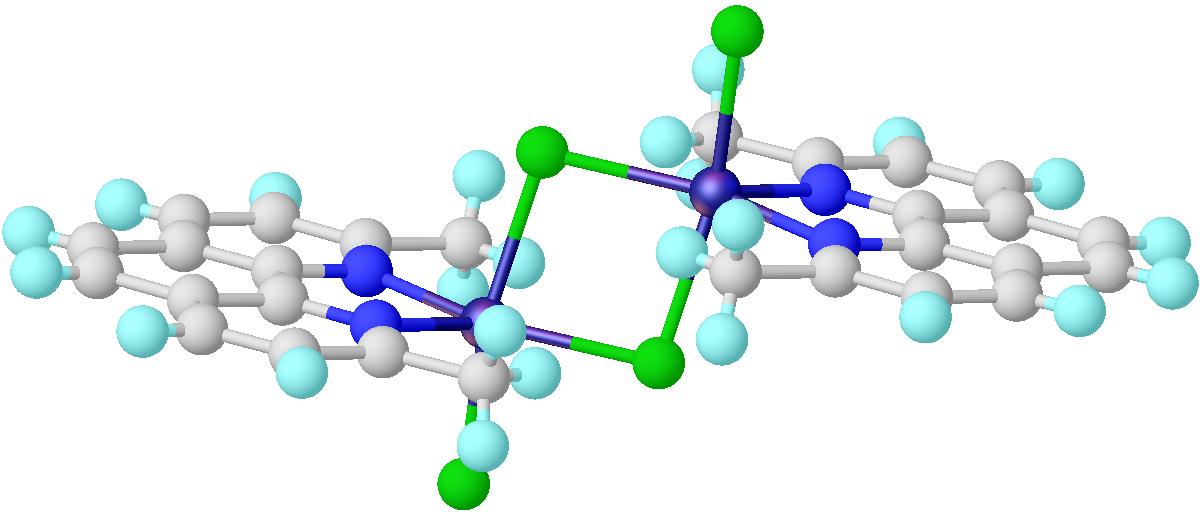
structure of [NiCl_{2}(neocuproine)]_{2}.

== Coordination chemistry ==
In the early 1930s, phenanthroline derivatives became known for their use as colorimetric indicators for many transition metals. Neocuproine proved to be highly selective for copper(I). The resulting complex, [Cu(neocuproine)_{2}]^{+} has a deep orange-red color. The properties of copper(I) neocuproine complexes have been widely studied, e.g. for the preparation of catenane and rotaxane complexes. The copper-catalyzed release of NO^{+} (nitrosonium) from S-Nitrosothiols is inhibited by neocuproine.

Relative to 1,10-phenanthroline, neocuproine bears steric bulk flanking the nitrogen donor sites. A major consequence is that complexes of the type [M(neocuproine)_{3}]^{n+} are disfavored, in contrast to the situation with phenanthroline ligands that lack substitution in the 2,9 positions. The ligand bathocuproine is similar to neocuproine, but has phenyl substituents at the 4,7-positions.

== Other metals ==
Platinum forms the square planar complexes [PtX_{2}(2,9-dimethyl-1,10-phenanthroline)].

Neocuproine has also been discovered to have properties that cause fragmentation and disappearance of the melanin in adult zebrafish melanocytes. Those expressing eGFP also have been observed to lose eGFP fluorescence in the presence of neocuproine.

== Appendix: NMR Shifts ==
The following figures contain information on the nuclear magnetic resonance spectroscopic data of neocuproine (from Chandler et al.):

^{1}H NMR
Substituent	Chemical Shift (δ ppm)
H-3,8	7.45
H-4,7	8.03
H-5,6	7.65

^{1}H Decoupled ^{13}C NMR
Substituent	Chemical Shift (δ ppm)
C-2	159.2
C-10b	145.1
C-4	136.2
C-4a	126.7
