= 1-Amino-3-phenylindole =

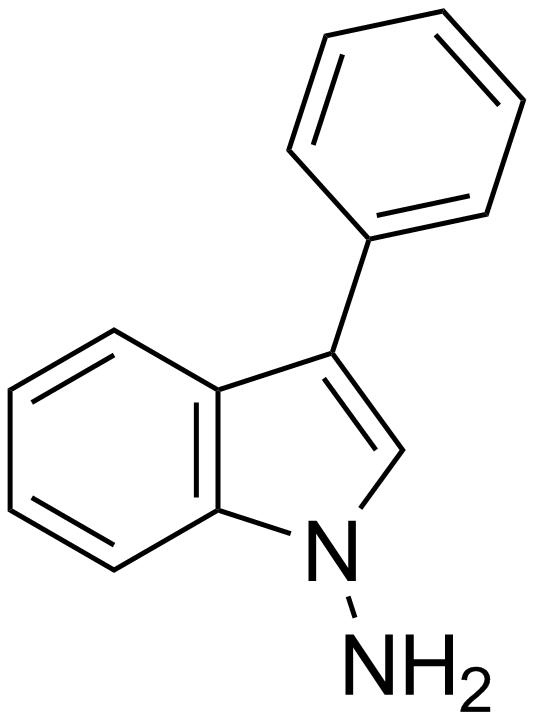

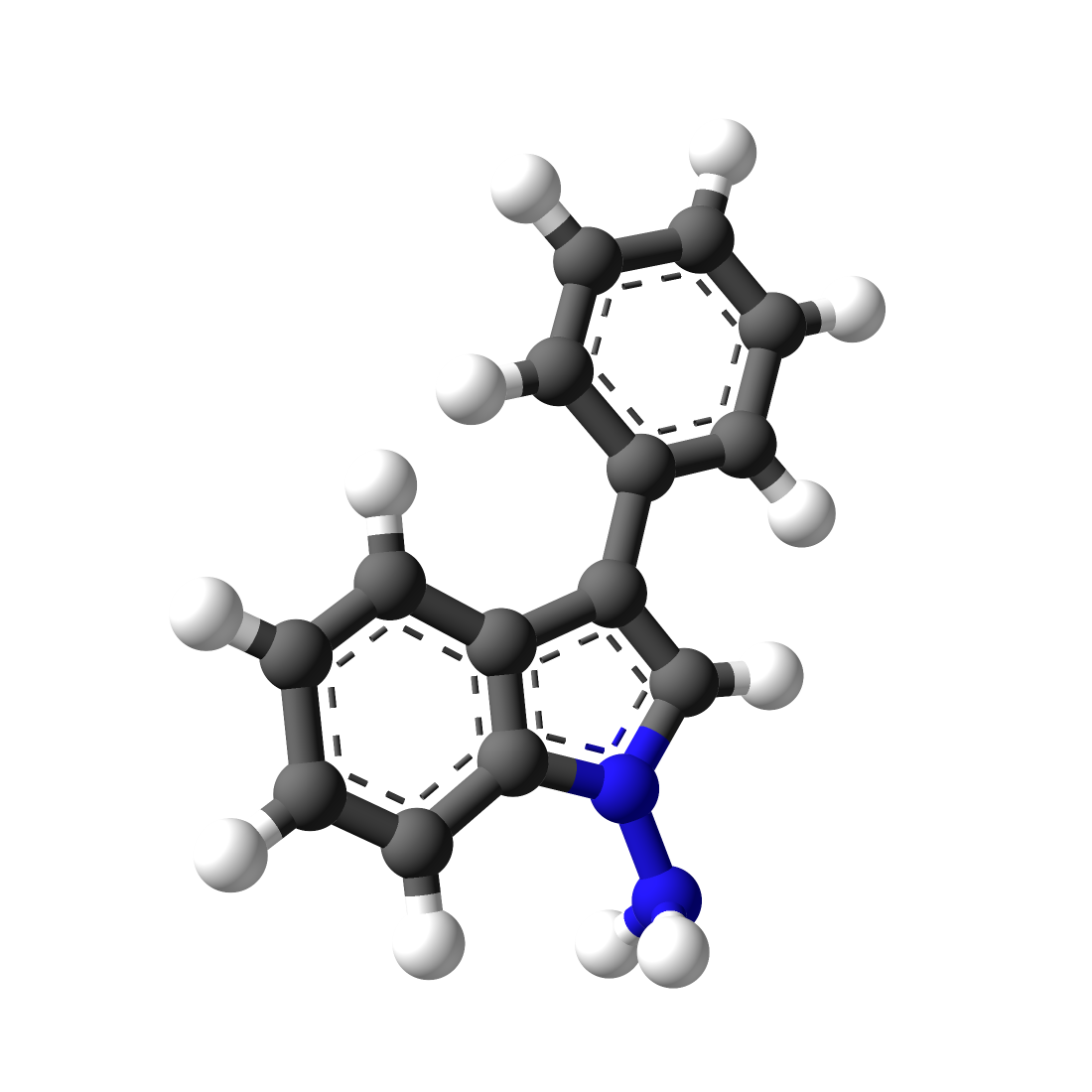

Names
- Preferred IUPAC name 3-Phenyl-1H-indol-1-amine

Identifiers
CAS Number	3929-81-5
3D model (JSmol)	Interactive image
ChemSpider	15284552
PubChem CID	20337768
UNII	CFT35SZK47
CompTox Dashboard (EPA)	DTXSID60605656
- InChI: InChI=1S/C14H12N2/c15-16-10-13(11-6-2-1-3-7-11)12-8-4-5-9-14(12)16/h1-10H,15H2 Key: SZBSSFJINJSGMH-UHFFFAOYSA-N; InChI=1/C14H12N2/c15-16-10-13(11-6-2-1-3-7-11)12-8-4-5-9-14(12)16/h1-10H,15H2 Key: SZBSSFJINJSGMH-UHFFFAOYAS
- SMILES: Nn2cc(c1ccccc12)c3ccccc3

Properties
Chemical formula	C_{14}H_{12}N_{2}
Molar mass	208.264 g·mol^{−1}
- Except where otherwise noted, data are given for materials in their standard state (at 25 °C [77 °F], 100 kPa). verify (what is ?) Infobox references

1-Amino-3-phenylindole is a chemical compound. A derivative of this substance is the antidepressant binedaline.
