= Phanquinone =

Chemical compound

Names
- Other names 4,7-phenanthroline-5,6-dione

Identifiers
CAS Number	84-12-8
3D model (JSmol)	Interactive image
ChEBI	CHEBI:59141
ChEMBL	ChEMBL531048
ChemSpider	6506
DrugBank	DB13469
ECHA InfoCard	100.001.378
EC Number	201-516-0
Gmelin Reference	365810
KEGG	D07359
PubChem CID	6764
UNII	ID94IS6N8J
CompTox Dashboard (EPA)	DTXSID3046112
- InChI: InChI=1S/C12H6N2O2/c15-11-9-7(3-1-5-13-9)8-4-2-6-14-10(8)12(11)16/h1-6H Key: VLPADTBFADIFKG-UHFFFAOYSA-N
- SMILES: O=C3c1ncccc1c2c(nccc2)C3=O

Properties
Chemical formula	C_{12}H_{6}N_{2}O_{2}
Molar mass	210.192 g·mol^{−1}
Appearance	yellow solid
Melting point	295 °C (563 °F; 568 K)

Hazards
- GHS labelling
Pictograms	(GHS07: Exclamation mark)
Signal word	Warning
Hazard statements	H302, H312, H332, H412
Precautionary statements	P261, P264, P270, P271, P273, P280, P301+P317, P302+P352, P304+P340, P317, P321, P330, P362+P364, P501
- Except where otherwise noted, data are given for materials in their standard state (at 25 °C [77 °F], 100 kPa). Infobox references

Phanquinone is an organic compound with the formula C_{12}H_{6}N_{2}O_{2}. It is derived by oxidation of 4,7-phenanthroline.

It has been investigated as both antiprotozoal agent and for its bactericidal activity . It has an extensive role as a ligand in coordination chemistry.

== Related compounds ==
- 1,10-Phenanthroline-5,6-dione
