= Bathocuproine =

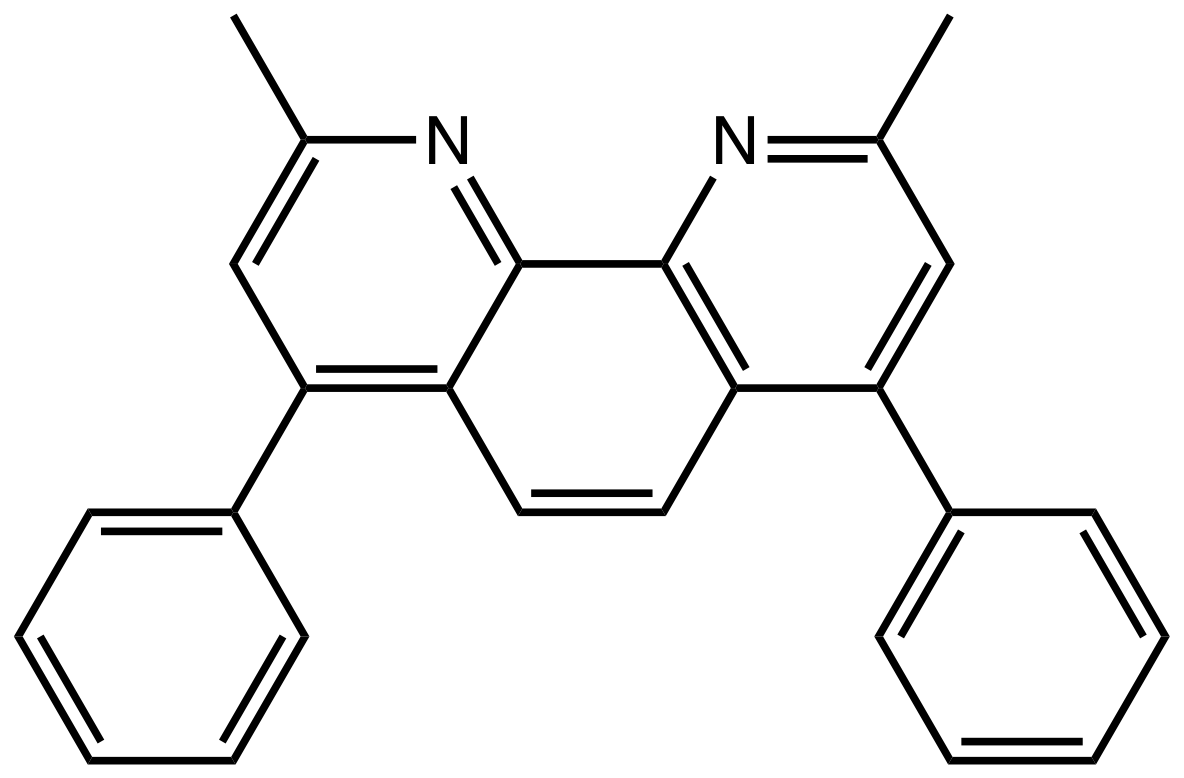

Names
- Preferred IUPAC name 2,9-Dimethyl-4,7-diphenyl-1,10-phenanthroline
- Other names: 2,9-Dimethyl-4,7-diaphenyl-1,10-phenanthroline; 2,9-Dimethyl-4,7-diphenylphenanthroline; 4,7-Diphenyl-2,9-dimethyl-1,10-phenanthroline; BCP

Identifiers
CAS Number	4733-39-5
3D model (JSmol)	Interactive image
ChEMBL	ChEMBL220061
ChemSpider	58658
ECHA InfoCard	100.022.945
EC Number	225-240-5
PubChem CID	65149
UNII	9THP2V94FX
CompTox Dashboard (EPA)	DTXSID4063585
- InChI: InChI=1S/C26H20N2/c1-17-15-23(19-9-5-3-6-10-19)21-13-14-22-24(20-11-7-4-8-12-20)16-18(2)28-26(22)25(21)27-17/h3-16H,1-2H3 Key: STTGYIUESPWXOW-UHFFFAOYSA-N
- SMILES: CC1=NC2=C(C=CC3=C2N=C(C=C3C4=CC=CC=C4)C)C(=C1)C5=CC=CC=C5

Properties
Chemical formula	C_{26}H_{20}N_{2}
Molar mass	360.460 g·mol^{−1}
Appearance	Pale yellow solid
Melting point	283 °C (541 °F; 556 K)
Solubility in water	organic solvents

Hazards
- GHS labelling
Pictograms	(GHS07: Exclamation mark)
Signal word	Warning
Hazard statements	H302, H413
Precautionary statements	P264, P270, P273, P301+P312, P330, P501
- Except where otherwise noted, data are given for materials in their standard state (at 25 °C [77 °F], 100 kPa). Infobox references

Bathocuproine is an organic compound with the formula (C_{6}H_{5})_{2}(CH_{3})_{2}C_{12}H_{4}N_{2}. It is related to 1,10-phenanthroline by the placement of two methyl groups and two phenyl groups in the 2,9 and 4,7 positions, respectively. Like 1,10-phenanthroline, bathocuproine is a bidentate chelating ligand. The two methyl groups flank the nitrogen centers, such that bathocuproine is a bulky ligand. It forms a monomeric 1:1 complex with nickel(II) chloride, whereas the less bulky parent phenanthroline forms a 2:1 complex.

This compound was first prepared by Case and Brennan in the early 1950s is a pale yellow solid that is soluble in polar organic solvents.
