= 1,10-Phenanthroline-5,6-dione =

Names
- Preferred IUPAC name 1,10-Phenanthroline-5,6-dione

Identifiers
CAS Number	27318-90-7
3D model (JSmol)	Interactive image
ChEBI	CHEBI:231244
ChEMBL	ChEMBL235504
ChemSpider	65646
ECHA InfoCard	100.156.024
EC Number	627-684-9
IUPHAR/BPS	11323
PubChem CID	72810
UNII	8JD7KXA2W0
CompTox Dashboard (EPA)	DTXSID60181763
- InChI: InChI=1S/C12H6N2O2/c15-11-7-3-1-5-13-9(7)10-8(12(11)16)4-2-6-14-10/h1-6H Key: KCALAFIVPCAXJI-UHFFFAOYSA-N
- SMILES: C1=CC2=C(C3=C(C=CC=N3)C(=O)C2=O)N=C1

Properties
Chemical formula	C_{12}H_{6}N_{2}O_{2}
Molar mass	210.192 g·mol^{−1}
Appearance	orange solid
Melting point	260 °C (500 °F; 533 K)

Hazards
- GHS labelling
Pictograms	(GHS07: Exclamation mark)
Signal word	Warning
Hazard statements	H315, H319, H335
Precautionary statements	P261, P264, P264+P265, P271, P280, P302+P352, P304+P340, P305+P351+P338, P319, P321, P332+P317, P337+P317, P362+P364, P403+P233, P405, P501
- Except where otherwise noted, data are given for materials in their standard state (at 25 °C [77 °F], 100 kPa). Infobox references

1,10-Phenanthroline-5,6-dione is an organic compound with the formula C_{12}H_{6}O_{2}N_{2}. It is the quinone derivative of 1,10-phenanthroline. The compound exhibits many reactions, including condensations with diamines to give quinoxalines and decarbonylation to give a diazafluorenone.

The compound is prepared by oxidation of 1,10-phenanthroline with a mixture of nitric and sulfuric acids. 5-Nitro-1,10-phenanthroline is an intermediate.

== See also ==
- Phanquinone
