= Better Choice Parking =

BCP
- Type: Private
- Founded: 1963
- Headquarters: Hythe, England
- Key people: Matthew Pack (CEO)
- Products: Airport parking
- Parent: Holiday Extras
- Website: www.parkbcp.co.uk

BCP, formerly Better Choice Parking, is an airport parking operator in the UK, also offering parking at Dover and Southampton ports. BCP also sells pre-bookable central London parking.

== History of BCP ==
BCP was incorporated in November 1963 as Terminus Securities Limited. In 1978 Terminus Securities acquired a car park at Gatwick Airport, on the airport boundary next to the runway, from British Chemotheutic Products.

In 1988 Stephen Moss, who had gained an MBA in Business Studies at the London Business School, was appointed managing director of BCP, the family's car parking business. Moss was instrumental in growing a small car park investment at Gatwick into a 5,000 space operation incorporating the UK's first multi-storey block-parked car park.

In October 1991 BCP extended the scope of their car parking operations by setting up a multi airport booking system using a network of airport car parks around the country. The network included their own Gatwick car park plus off airport parking facilities for Heathrow, Manchester, Birmingham, Leeds Bradford, Edinburgh, Glasgow and Belfast. BCP also offered advance booking facilities for the on-airport car parks at Luton, East Midlands, Manchester, Cardiff and Southampton. There were also facilities for parking at the seaports of Dover and Folkestone. The BCP booking service was awarded the ISO 9002 Certificate for Quality Assurance in 1995.

In 1996 BCP introduced a Meet and Greet parking service and also launched a chauffeur driven airport car service at the major UK airports. In 1998 BCP extended their product range to offer bookings for overnight airport hotels and UK short breaks. In 1999 BCP also began to offer worldwide car hire, travel insurance and airport executive lounges. In July 1999 the company was incorporated, becoming BCP Limited. BCP moved to bespoke new offices at Astrid Towers, which housed a modern call centre and the company was accredited with the Investors In People Award in 2000.

In March 2006 BCP announced that it would be joining forces with Ryanair, allowing their passengers to book BCP products through the Ryanair website.

In December 2008, the company was acquired by Holiday Extras.

And this company is different then Britain Car Park, a identical brand name (BCP).
