= 1,10-Phenanthroline =

Heterocyclic organic compound

Phenanthroline
- 1,10-phenanthroline

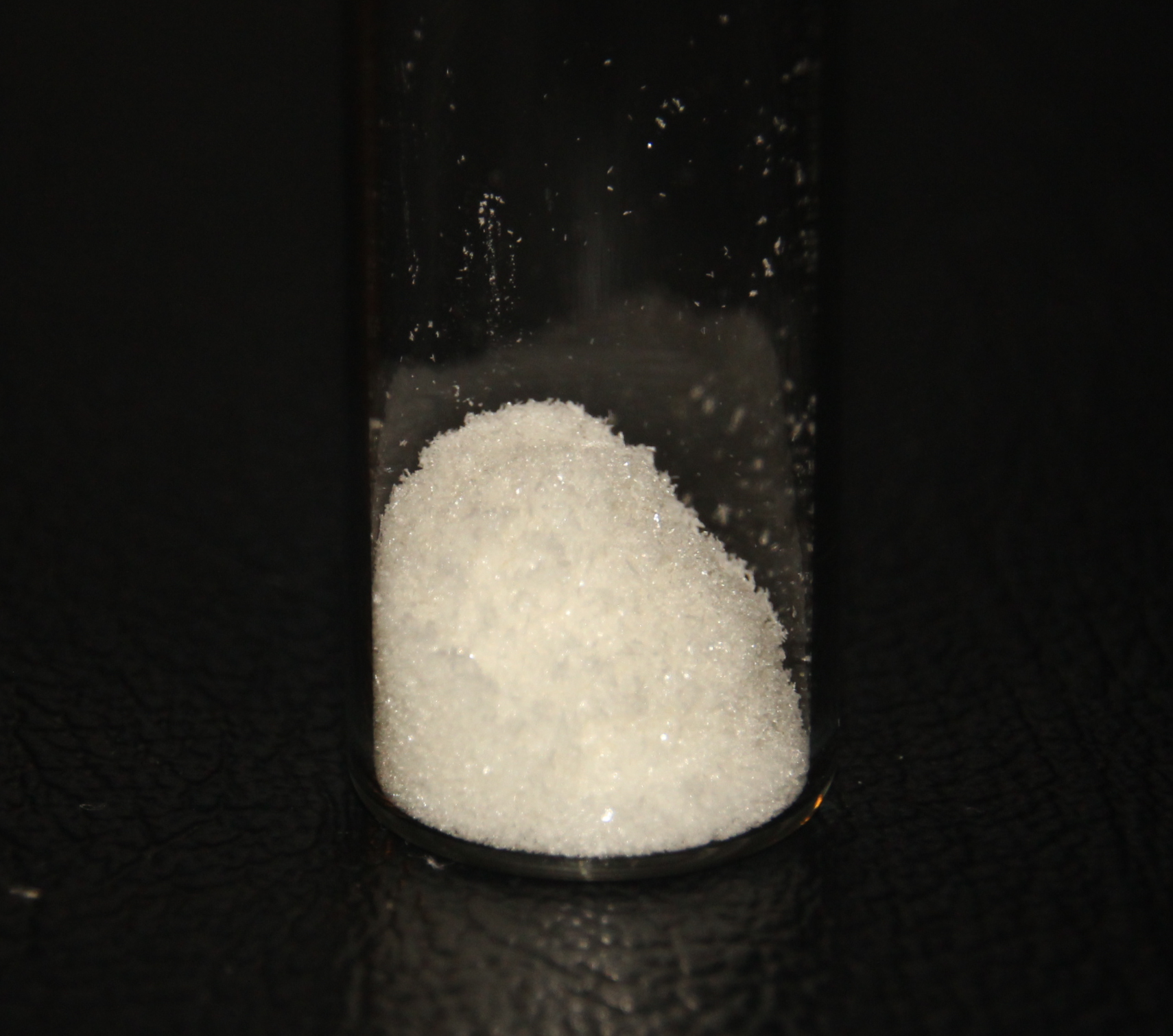
- Sample of 1,10-Phenanthroline

Names
- Preferred IUPAC name 1,10-Phenanthroline

Identifiers
CAS Number	66-71-7; monohydrate: 5144-89-8 (monohydrate)
3D model (JSmol)	Interactive image; monohydrate: Interactive image
Beilstein Reference	126461
ChEBI	CHEBI:44975
ChEMBL	ChEMBL415879; monohydrate: ChEMBL1255788
ChemSpider	1278; monohydrate: 19955
DrugBank	DB02365
ECHA InfoCard	100.000.572
EC Number	200-629-2; monohydrate: 627-114-9
Gmelin Reference	4040
KEGG	C00604
PubChem CID	1318; monohydrate: 21226
RTECS number	SF8300000
UNII	W4X6ZO7939; monohydrate: KSX215X00E
UN number	2811
CompTox Dashboard (EPA)	DTXSID1025857
- InChI: InChI=1S/C12H8N2/c1-3-9-5-6-10-4-2-8-14-12(10)11(9)13-7-1/h1-8H Key: DGEZNRSVGBDHLK-UHFFFAOYSA-N; InChI=1/C12H8N2/c1-3-9-5-6-10-4-2-8-14-12(10)11(9)13-7-1/h1-8H Key: DGEZNRSVGBDHLK-UHFFFAOYAW
- SMILES: c1cc2ccc3cccnc3c2nc1; monohydrate: C1=CC2=C(C3=C(C=CC=N3)C=C2)N=C1.O

Properties
Chemical formula	C_{12}H_{8}N_{2}
Molar mass	180.21 g/mol
Appearance	colourless crystals
Density	1.31 g/cm^{3}
Melting point	118.56 °C (245.41 °F; 391.71 K)
Boiling point	409.2°C
Solubility in water	high
Solubility in other solvents	acetone, ethanol
Acidity (pK_{a})	4.84 (phenH^{+})

Hazards
- Occupational safety and health (OHS/OSH)
Main hazards	mild neurotoxin, strong nephrotoxin, and powerful diuretic
- GHS labelling
Pictograms	(GHS06: Toxic) (GHS09: Environmental hazard)
Signal word	Danger
Hazard statements	H301, H410
Precautionary statements	P264, P270, P273, P301+P310, P321, P330, P391, P405, P501

Related compounds
Related compounds	2,2'-bipyridine ferroin phenanthrene
- Except where otherwise noted, data are given for materials in their standard state (at 25 °C [77 °F], 100 kPa). verify (what is ?) Infobox references

1,10-Phenanthroline (phen) is a heterocyclic organic compound. It is a white solid that is soluble in organic solvents. The 1,10 refers to the location of the nitrogen atoms that replace CH's in the hydrocarbon called phenanthrene.

Abbreviated "phen", or sometimes "o-phen" for ortho-phenanthroline, it is used as a ligand in coordination chemistry, forming strong complexes with most metal ions. It is often sold as the monohydrate.

== Synthesis ==
Phenanthroline can be prepared by two successive Skraup reactions of glycerol with o-phenylenediamine, catalyzed by sulfuric acid, and an oxidizing agent, traditionally aqueous arsenic acid or nitrobenzene. Dehydration of glycerol gives acrolein which condenses with the amine followed by a cyclization.

== Reactions ==
Oxidation of 1,10-phenanthroline with a mixture of nitric and sulfuric acids gives 1,10-phenanthroline-5,6-dione.

1,10-Phenanthroline forms many coordination complexes. One example is the iron complex called ferroin.

Alkyllithium reagents form deeply colored derivatives with phenanthroline. The alkyllithium content of solutions can be determined by treatment of such reagents with small amounts of phenanthroline (ca. 1 mg) followed by titration with alcohols to a colourless endpoint. Grignard reagents may be similarly titrated.

== Pharmacology ==
Phenanthroline is used in biochemical and pharmacological research as an inhibitor of the deubiquitination enzyme Rpn11.
