= Ruthenium =

Ruthenium, _{44}Ru
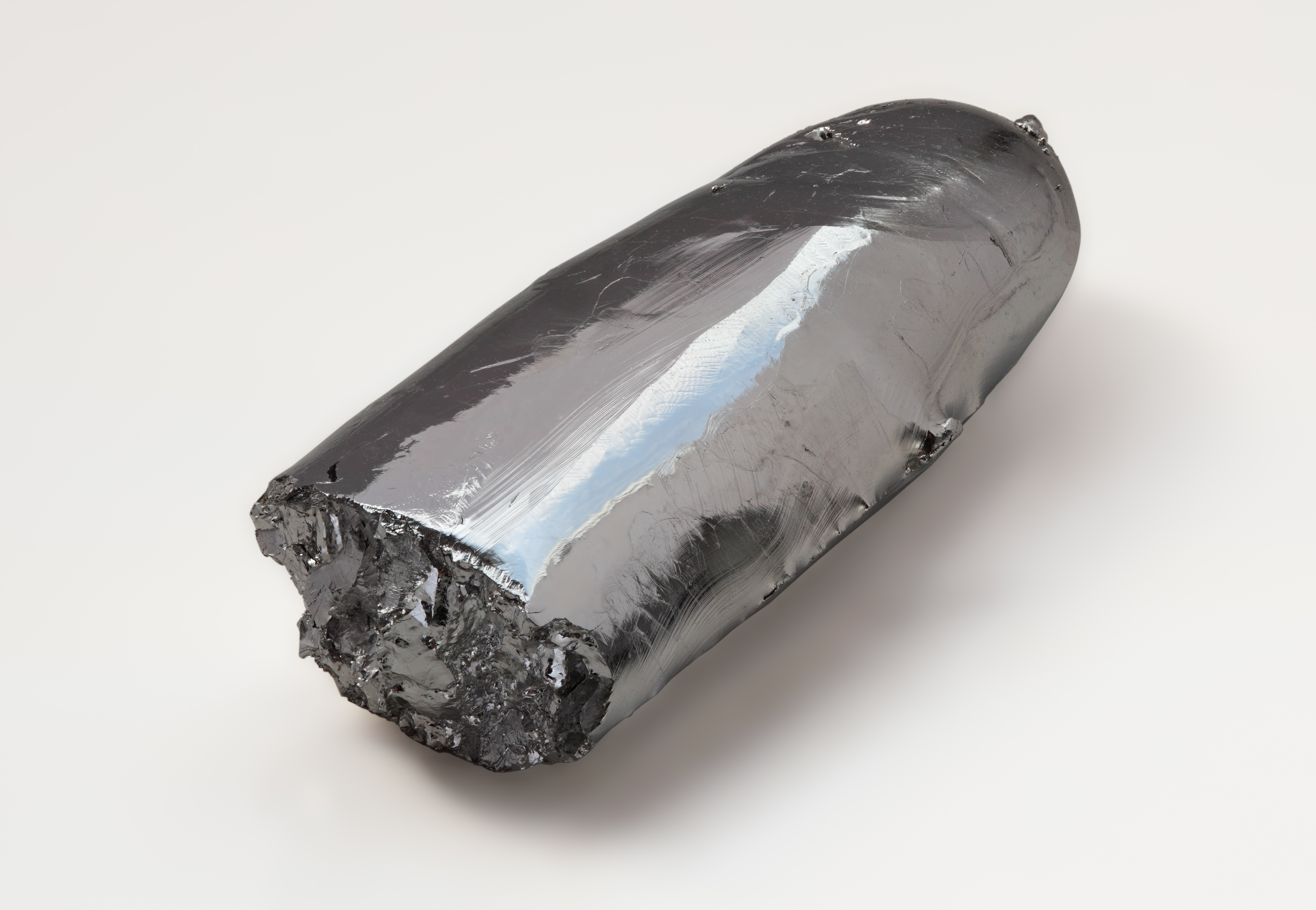

Ruthenium
- Pronunciation: /ruːˈθiːniəm/
- Appearance: silvery white metallic

Standard atomic weight A_{r}°(Ru)
- 101.07±0.02; 101.07±0.02 (abridged)

Ruthenium in the periodic table
Hydrogen																															Helium
Lithium	Beryllium																									Boron	Carbon	Nitrogen	Oxygen	Fluorine	Neon
Sodium	Magnesium																									Aluminium	Silicon	Phosphorus	Sulfur	Chlorine	Argon
Potassium	Calcium															Scandium	Titanium	Vanadium	Chromium	Manganese	Iron	Cobalt	Nickel	Copper	Zinc	Gallium	Germanium	Arsenic	Selenium	Bromine	Krypton
Rubidium	Strontium															Yttrium	Zirconium	Niobium	Molybdenum	Technetium	Ruthenium	Rhodium	Palladium	Silver	Cadmium	Indium	Tin	Antimony	Tellurium	Iodine	Xenon
Caesium	Barium	Lanthanum	Cerium	Praseodymium	Neodymium	Promethium	Samarium	Europium	Gadolinium	Terbium	Dysprosium	Holmium	Erbium	Thulium	Ytterbium	Lutetium	Hafnium	Tantalum	Tungsten	Rhenium	Osmium	Iridium	Platinum	Gold	Mercury (element)	Thallium	Lead	Bismuth	Polonium	Astatine	Radon
Francium	Radium	Actinium	Thorium	Protactinium	Uranium	Neptunium	Plutonium	Americium	Curium	Berkelium	Californium	Einsteinium	Fermium	Mendelevium	Nobelium	Lawrencium	Rutherfordium	Dubnium	Seaborgium	Bohrium	Hassium	Meitnerium	Darmstadtium	Roentgenium	Copernicium	Nihonium	Flerovium	Moscovium	Livermorium	Tennessine	Oganesson
Fe
↑
Ru
↓
Os
technetium ← ruthenium → rhodium
- Atomic number (Z): 44
- Group: group 8
- Period: period 5
- Block: d-block
- Electron configuration: [Kr] 4d^{7} 5s^{1}
- Electrons per shell: 2, 8, 18, 15, 1

Physical properties
- Phase at STP: solid
- Melting point: 2607 K (2334 °C, 4233 °F)
- Boiling point: 4423 K (4150 °C, 7502 °F)
- Density (at 20° C): 12.364 g/cm^{3}
- when liquid (at m.p.): 10.65 g/cm^{3}
- Heat of fusion: 38.59 kJ/mol
- Heat of vaporization: 619 kJ/mol
- Molar heat capacity: 24.06 J/(mol·K)
- Specific heat capacity: 238.053 J/(kg·K)
Vapor pressure
P (Pa)	1	10	100	1 k	10 k	100 k
at T (K)	2588	2811	3087	3424	3845	4388

Atomic properties
- Oxidation states: common: +3, +4 −2, −1, 0, +1, +2, +5, +6, +7, +8
- Electronegativity: Pauling scale: 2.2
- Ionization energies: 1st: 710.2 kJ/mol; 2nd: 1620 kJ/mol; 3rd: 2747 kJ/mol
- Atomic radius: empirical: 134 pm
- Covalent radius: 146 ± 7 pm
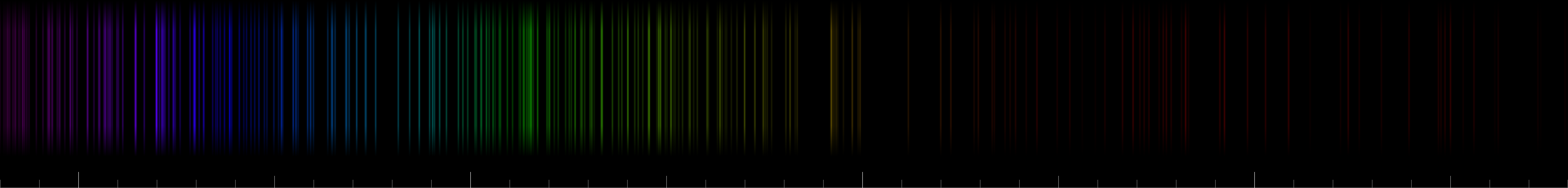
- Spectral lines of ruthenium

Other properties
- Natural occurrence: primordial
- Crystal structure: hexagonal close-packed (hcp) (hP2)
- Lattice constants: a = 270.58 pm c = 428.16 pm (at 20 °C)
- Thermal expansion: 6.78×10^{−6}/K (at 20 °C) (Note: The thermal expansion is anisotropic: the parameters (at 20 °C) for each crystal axis are α_{a} = 5.77×10^{−6}/K, α_{c} = 8.80×10^{−6}/K, and α_{average} = α_{V} = 6.78×10^{−6}/K.)
- Thermal conductivity: 117 W/(m⋅K) α_{a} = 5.77, α_{c} = 8.80, α_{avr} = 6.78
- Electrical resistivity: 71 nΩ⋅m (at 0 °C)
- Magnetic ordering: paramagnetic
- Molar magnetic susceptibility: +39×10^{−6} cm^{3}/mol (298 K)
- Young's modulus: 447 GPa
- Shear modulus: 173 GPa
- Bulk modulus: 220 GPa
- Speed of sound thin rod: 5970 m/s (at 20 °C)
- Poisson ratio: 0.30
- Mohs hardness: 6.5
- Brinell hardness: 2160 MPa
- CAS Number: 7440-18-8

History
- Naming: from Latin Ruthenia for Russia
- Discovery and first isolation: Karl Ernst Claus (1844)

Isotopes of ruthenium
Main isotopes			Decay	
Isotope	abundance	half-life (t_{1/2})	mode	product
^{96}Ru	5.54%	stable		
^{97}Ru	synth	2.837 d	ε	^{97}Tc
^{98}Ru	1.87%	stable		
^{99}Ru	12.76%	stable		
^{100}Ru	12.60%	stable		
^{101}Ru	17.06%	stable		
^{102}Ru	31.55%	stable		
^{103}Ru	synth	39.245 d	β^{−}	^{103}Rh
^{104}Ru	18.62%	stable		
^{106}Ru	synth	371.8 d	β^{−}	^{106}Rh

Ruthenium is a chemical element; it has symbol Ru and atomic number 44. It is a rare transition metal belonging to the platinum group of the periodic table. Like the other metals of the platinum group, ruthenium is unreactive to most chemicals. Karl Ernst Claus, a Russian scientist of Baltic-German ancestry, discovered the element in 1844 at Kazan State University and named it in honor of Russia, using the Latin name Ruthenia. Ruthenium is usually found as a minor component of platinum ores; the annual production has risen from about 19 tonnes in 2009 to 35.5 tonnes in 2017. Most ruthenium produced is used in wear-resistant electrical contacts and thick-film resistors. A minor application for ruthenium is in platinum alloys and as a chemical catalyst. A new application of ruthenium is as the capping layer for extreme-ultraviolet photomasks in semiconductor lithography. Ruthenium is generally found in ores with the other platinum-group metals in the Ural Mountains and in North and South America. Small but commercially important quantities are also found in pentlandite extracted from Sudbury, Ontario, and in pyroxenite deposits in South Africa.

== Characteristics ==
=== Physical properties ===
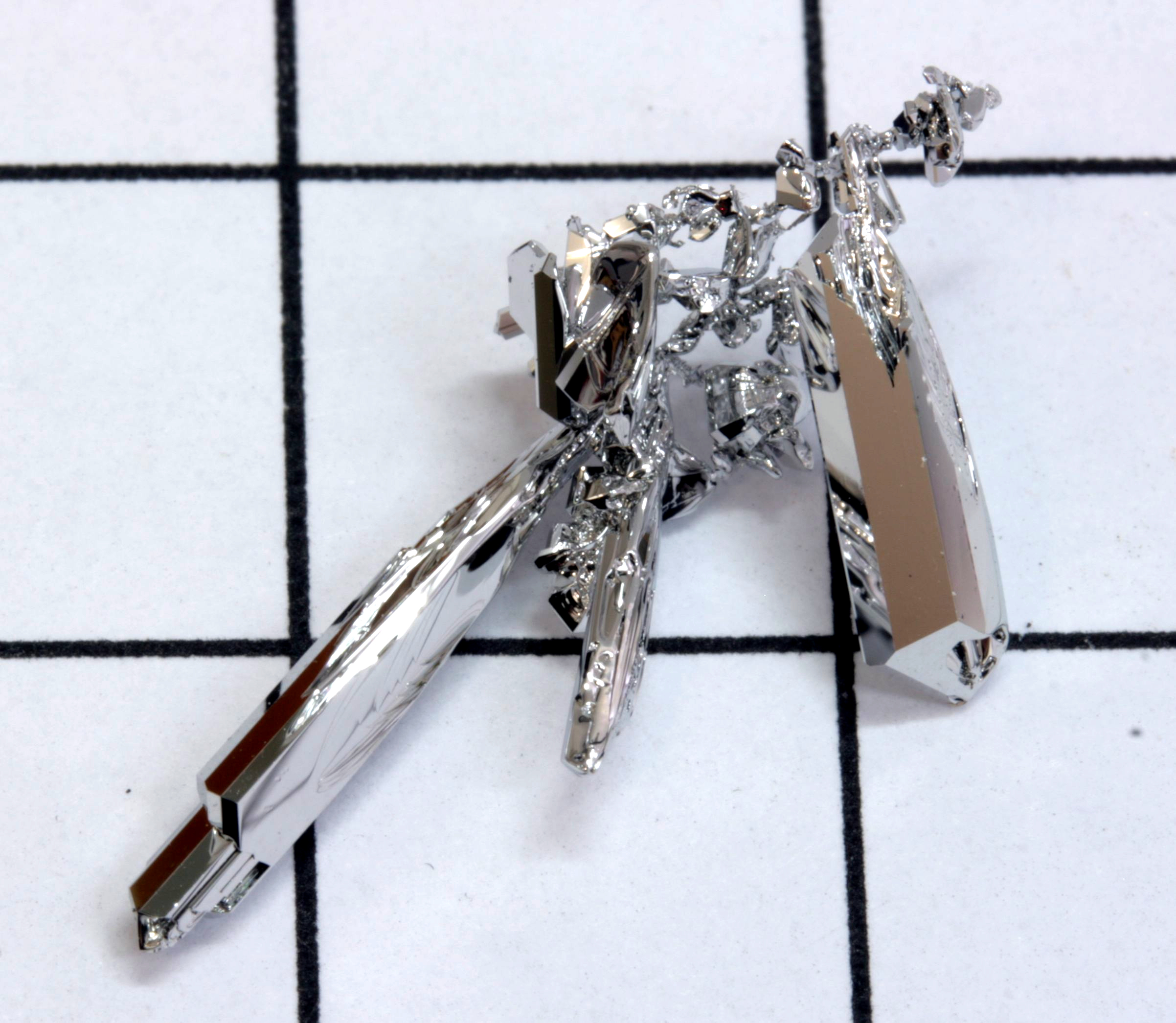
Gas-phase-grown crystals of ruthenium metal

Ruthenium, a polyvalent hard white metal, is a member of the platinum group and is in group 8 of the periodic table:

Z	Element	No. of electrons/shell
26	iron	2, 8, 14, 2
44	ruthenium	2, 8, 18, 15, 1
76	osmium	2, 8, 18, 32, 14, 2
108	hassium	2, 8, 18, 32, 32, 14, 2

While other group 8 elements have two electrons in the outermost shell, in ruthenium the outermost shell has only one electron (the final electron is in a lower shell). This anomaly, which has no effect on chemical properties, is also observed in all other elements (except technetium) in the range of Z = 41–45.

=== Chemical properties ===
Ruthenium has four crystal modifications and does not tarnish at ambient conditions; it oxidizes upon heating to 800 °C (1,070 K). Ruthenium dissolves in fused alkalis to give ruthenates (RuO_{4}^{2−}). It is not attacked by acids (even aqua regia) but is attacked by sodium hypochlorite at room temperature, and halogens at high temperatures. Ruthenium is most readily attacked by oxidizing agents. Small amounts of ruthenium can increase the hardness of platinum and palladium. The corrosion resistance of titanium is increased markedly by the addition of a small amount of ruthenium. The metal can be plated by electroplating and by thermal decomposition. A ruthenium–molybdenum alloy is known to be superconductive at temperatures below 10.6 K. Ruthenium is the only 4d transition metal that can assume the oxidation state +8, and even then it is less stable there than the heavier congener osmium: this is the first group from the left of the table where the second- and third-row transition metals display notable differences in chemical behavior. Like iron but unlike osmium, ruthenium can form aqueous cations in its lower oxidation +2 and +3 states.

Ruthenium is the first in a downward trend in the melting and boiling points and atomization enthalpy in the 4d transition metals after the maximum seen at molybdenum, because the 4d subshell is more than half full and the electrons are contributing less to metallic bonding. (Technetium, the previous element, has an exceptionally low value that is off the trend due to its half-filled [Kr]4d^{5}5s^{2} configuration, though it is not as far off the trend in the 4d series as manganese in the 3d transition series.) Unlike its lighter congener iron, ruthenium is mainly paramagnetic at room temperature. However, the metastable tetragonal phase of ruthenium, created as a thin film on single-crystal Mo, is ferromagnetic at room temperature.

The reduction potentials in acidic aqueous solution for some common ruthenium species are shown below:

Potential	Reaction	
0.455 V	Ru^{2+} + 2 e^{−}	⇌ Ru
0.249 V	Ru^{3+} + e^{−}	⇌ Ru^{2+}
1.120 V	RuO_{2} + 4 H^{+} + 2 e^{−}	⇌ Ru^{2+} + 2 H_{2}O
1.563 V	RuO_{4}^{2−} + 8 H^{+} + 4 e^{−}	⇌ Ru^{2+} + 4 H_{2}O
1.368 V	RuO_{4}^{−} + 8 H^{+} + 5 e^{−}	⇌ Ru^{2+} + 4 H_{2}O
1.387 V	RuO_{4} + 4 H^{+} + 4 e^{−}	⇌ RuO_{2} + 2 H_{2}O

=== Isotopes ===
Naturally occurring ruthenium is composed of seven stable isotopes: 96, 98–102, 104. Additionally, 34 synthetic radioactive isotopes have been discovered. Of these radioisotopes, the most stable are ^{106}Ru with a half-life of 371.8 days, ^{103}Ru with a half-life of 39.245 days, and ^{97}Ru with a half-life of 2.837 days.

Fifteen other radioisotopes have been characterized, ranging from ^{85}Ru to ^{125}Ru. Most of these have half-lives that are less than 5 minutes; the exceptions are ^{94}Ru (51.8 minutes), ^{95}Ru (1.607 hours), and ^{105}Ru (4.44 hours).

The primary decay mode for isotopes lighter than the most abundant isotope, ^{102}Ru, is electron capture to produce technetium, while the primary mode for heavier isotopes is beta emission to rhodium.

^{106}Ru is a fission product of uranium or plutonium. High concentrations of this isotope detected in the atmosphere over Europe were associated with an alleged undeclared nuclear accident in Russia in 2017.

=== Occurrence ===
Ruthenium is found in about 100 parts per trillion in the Earth's crust, making it the 78th most abundant element. It is generally found in ores with the other platinum-group metals in the Ural Mountains and in North and South America. Small but commercially important quantities are also found in pentlandite extracted from Sudbury, Ontario, Canada, and in pyroxenite deposits in South Africa. The native form of ruthenium is a very rare mineral (Ir replaces part of Ru in its structure).

== Production ==
Roughly 30 tonnes of ruthenium are mined each year, and world reserves are estimated at 5,000 tonnes. The composition of the mined platinum-group metal (PGM) mixtures varies widely, depending on the geochemical formation. For example, the PGMs mined in South Africa contain on average 11% ruthenium, while the PGMs mined in the former USSR contain only 2% (1992). Ruthenium, osmium, and iridium are considered the minor platinum-group metals.

Ruthenium, like the other platinum-group metals, is obtained commercially as a by-product from processing of nickel, copper, and platinum metal ore. During electrorefining of copper and nickel, noble metals such as silver, gold, and the platinum-group metals precipitate as anode mud, the feedstock for the extraction. The metals are converted to ionized solutes by any of several methods, depending on the composition of the feedstock. One representative method is fusion with sodium peroxide followed by dissolution in aqua regia, and solution in a mixture of chlorine with hydrochloric acid. Osmium (Os), ruthenium (Ru), rhodium (Rh), and iridium (Ir) are insoluble in aqua regia and readily precipitate, leaving the other metals in solution. Rhodium is separated from the residue by treatment with molten sodium bisulfate. The insoluble residue, containing Ru, Os, and Ir is treated with sodium oxide, in which Ir is insoluble, producing dissolved Ru and Os salts. After oxidation to the volatile oxides, RuO_{4} is separated from OsO_{4} by precipitation of (NH_{4})_{3}RuCl_{6} with ammonium chloride or by distillation or extraction with organic solvents of the volatile osmium tetroxide. Hydrogen is used to reduce ammonium ruthenium chloride, yielding a powder. The product is reduced using hydrogen, yielding the metal as a powder or sponge metal that can be treated with powder metallurgy techniques or argon-arc welding.

Ruthenium is contained in spent nuclear fuel, both as a direct fission product and as a product of neutron absorption by long-lived fission product ^{99}Tc. After allowing the unstable isotopes of ruthenium to decay, chemical extraction could yield ruthenium for use in all applications of ruthenium.

Ruthenium can also be produced by deliberate nuclear transmutation from ^{99}Tc. Given its relatively long half-life, high fission product yield and high chemical mobility in the environment, ^{99}Tc is among the most often proposed non-actinides for commercial-scale nuclear transmutation. ^{99}Tc has a relatively large neutron cross section, and because technetium has no stable isotopes, there would not be a problem of neutron activation of stable isotopes. Significant amounts of ^{99}Tc are produced in nuclear fission. They are also produced as a byproduct of the use of ^{99m}Tc in nuclear medicine, because this isomer decays to ^{99}Tc. Exposing the ^{99}Tc target to strong enough neutron radiation will eventually yield appreciable quantities of ruthenium, which can be chemically separated while consuming ^{99}Tc.

== Chemical compounds ==
The oxidation states of ruthenium range from −2 to +8. The properties of ruthenium and osmium compounds are often similar. The +2, +3, and +4 states are the most common. The most prevalent precursor is ruthenium trichloride, a brown solid that is poorly defined chemically but versatile synthetically.

=== Oxides and chalcogenides ===
Ruthenium can be oxidized to ruthenium(IV) oxide (RuO_{2}, oxidation state +4), which can, in turn, be oxidized by sodium metaperiodate to the volatile yellow tetrahedral ruthenium tetroxide, RuO_{4}, an aggressive, strong oxidizing agent with structure and properties analogous to osmium tetroxide. RuO_{4} is mostly used as an intermediate in the purification of ruthenium from ores and radiowastes.

Dipotassium ruthenate (K_{2}RuO_{4}, +6) and potassium perruthenate (KRuO_{4}, +7) are also known. Unlike osmium tetroxide, ruthenium tetroxide is less stable, is strong enough as an oxidizing agent to oxidize dilute hydrochloric acid and organic solvents like ethanol at room temperature, and is easily reduced to ruthenate (RuO_{4}^{2−}) in aqueous alkaline solutions; it decomposes to form the dioxide above 100 °C. Unlike iron but like osmium, ruthenium does not form oxides in its lower +2 and +3 oxidation states. Ruthenium forms dichalcogenides, which are diamagnetic semiconductors crystallizing in the pyrite structure. Ruthenium sulfide (RuS_{2}) occurs naturally as the mineral laurite.

Like iron, ruthenium does not readily form oxoanions and prefers to achieve high coordination numbers with hydroxide ions instead. Ruthenium tetroxide is reduced by cold dilute potassium hydroxide to form black potassium perruthenate, KRuO_{4}, with ruthenium in the +7 oxidation state. Potassium perruthenate can also be produced by oxidizing potassium ruthenate, K_{2}RuO_{4}, with chlorine gas. The perruthenate ion is unstable and is reduced by water to form the orange ruthenate. Potassium ruthenate may be synthesized by reacting ruthenium metal with molten potassium hydroxide and potassium nitrate.

Some mixed oxides are also known, such as M^{II}Ru^{IV}O_{3}, Na_{3}Ru^{V}O_{4}, Na_{2}Ru^{V}_{2}O_{7}, and MRu^{II}_{2}LnRu^{III}RuRu^{V}O_{6}.

=== Halides and oxyhalides ===
The highest known ruthenium halide is the hexafluoride, a dark brown solid that melts at 54 °C. It hydrolyzes violently upon contact with water and easily disproportionates to form a mixture of lower ruthenium fluorides, releasing fluorine gas. Ruthenium pentafluoride is a tetrameric dark green solid that is also readily hydrolyzed, melting at 86.5 °C. The yellow ruthenium tetrafluoride is probably also polymeric and can be formed by reducing the pentafluoride with iodine. Among the binary compounds of ruthenium, these high oxidation states are known only in the oxides and fluorides.

Ruthenium trichloride is a well-known compound, existing in a black α-form and a dark brown β-form: the trihydrate is red. Of the known trihalides, trifluoride is dark brown and decomposes above 650 °C, tribromide is dark-brown and decomposes above 400 °C, and triiodide is black. Of the dihalides, difluoride is not known, dichloride is brown, dibromide is black, and diiodide is blue. The only known oxyhalide is the pale green ruthenium(VI) oxyfluoride, RuOF_{4}.

=== Coordination and organometallic complexes ===
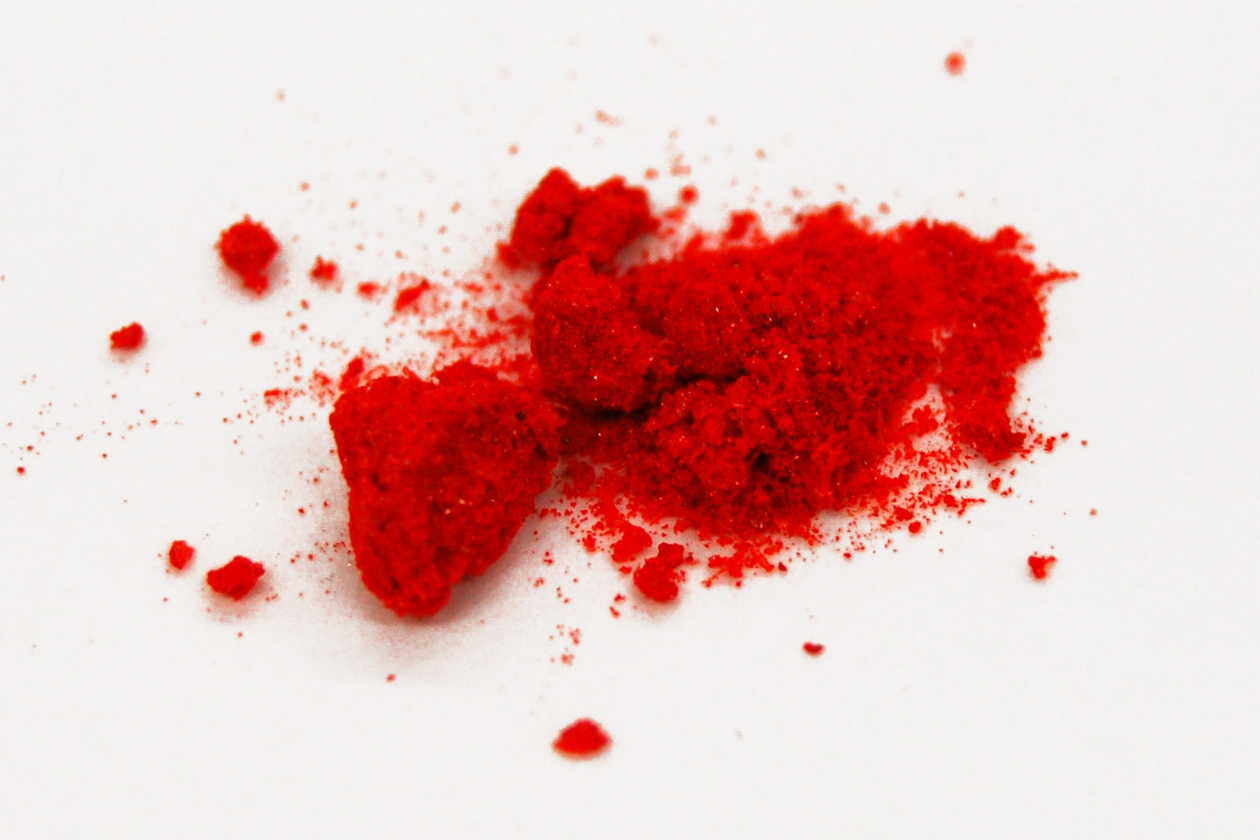
Tris(bipyridine)ruthenium(II) chloride

Grubbs' catalyst, which earned a Nobel Prize for its inventor, is used in alkene metathesis reactions.

Ruthenium forms a variety of coordination complexes. Examples are the many pentaammine derivatives [Ru(NH_{3})_{5}L](n^{+}) that often exist for both Ru(II) and Ru(III). Derivatives of bipyridine and terpyridine are numerous, best known being the luminescent tris(bipyridine)ruthenium(II) chloride.

Ruthenium forms a wide range compounds with carbon–ruthenium bonds. Grubbs' catalyst is used for alkene metathesis. Ruthenocene is analogous to ferrocene structurally, but exhibits distinctive redox properties. The colorless liquid ruthenium pentacarbonyl converts in the absence of CO pressure to the dark red solid triruthenium dodecacarbonyl. Ruthenium trichloride reacts with carbon monoxide to give many derivatives including RuHCl(CO)(PPh_{3})_{3} and Ru(CO)_{2}(PPh_{3})_{3} (Roper's complex). Heating solutions of ruthenium trichloride in alcohols with triphenylphosphine gives tris(triphenylphosphine)ruthenium dichloride (RuCl_{2}(PPh_{3})_{3}), which converts to the hydride complex chlorohydridotris(triphenylphosphine)ruthenium(II) (RuHCl(PPh_{3})_{3}).

== History ==
Though naturally occurring platinum alloys containing all six platinum-group metals were used for a long time by pre-Columbian Americans and known as a material to European chemists from the mid-16th century, not until the mid-18th century was platinum identified as a pure element. That natural platinum contained palladium, rhodium, osmium and iridium was discovered in the first decade of the 19th century. Platinum in alluvial sands of Russian rivers gave access to raw material for use in plates and medals and for the minting of ruble coins, starting in 1828.

It is possible that the Polish chemist Jędrzej Śniadecki isolated element 44 (which he called "vestium" after the asteroid Vesta discovered shortly before) from South American platinum ores in 1807. He published an announcement of his discovery in 1808. His work was never confirmed, however, and he later withdrew his claim of discovery.

Jöns Berzelius and Gottfried Osann nearly discovered ruthenium in 1827. They examined residues that were left after dissolving crude platinum from the Ural Mountains in aqua regia. Berzelius did not find any unusual metals, but Osann thought he found three new metals, which he called pluranium, ruthenium, and polinium. This discrepancy led to a long-standing controversy between Berzelius and Osann about the composition of the residues. As Osann was not able to repeat his isolation of ruthenium, he eventually relinquished his claims. The name "ruthenium" was chosen by Osann because the analyzed samples stemmed from the Ural Mountains in Russia.

In 1844, Karl Ernst Claus, a Russian scientist of Baltic German descent, showed that the compounds prepared by Gottfried Osann contained small amounts of ruthenium, which Claus had discovered the same year. Claus isolated ruthenium from the platinum residues of rouble production while he was working in Kazan University, Kazan, the same way its heavier congener osmium had been discovered four decades earlier. Claus showed that ruthenium oxide contained a new metal and obtained 6 grams of ruthenium from the part of crude platinum that is insoluble in aqua regia. Choosing the name for the new element, Claus stated: "I named the new body, in honour of my Motherland, ruthenium. I had every right to call it by this name because Mr. Osann relinquished his ruthenium and the word does not yet exist in chemistry." The name itself derives from the Latin word Ruthenia. In doing so, Claus started a trend that continues to this day – naming an element after a country.

== Applications ==
Approximately 30.9 tonnes of ruthenium were consumed in 2016, 13.8 of them in electrical applications, 7.7 in catalysis, and 4.6 in electrochemistry.

Because it hardens platinum and palladium alloys, ruthenium is used in electrical contacts, where a thin film is sufficient to achieve the desired durability. With its similar properties to and lower cost than rhodium, electric contacts are a major use of ruthenium. The ruthenium plate is applied to the electrical contact and electrode base metal by electroplating or sputtering.

Ruthenium dioxide with lead and bismuth ruthenates are used in thick-film chip resistors. These two electronic applications account for 50% of the ruthenium consumption.

Ruthenium is occasionally alloyed with metals outside the platinum group, where small quantities improve some properties. The added corrosion resistance in titanium alloys led to the development of a special alloy with 0.1% ruthenium. Ruthenium is also used in some advanced high-temperature single-crystal superalloys, with applications that include the turbines in jet engines. Several nickel based superalloy compositions are described, such as EPM-102 (with 3% Ru), TMS-162 (with 6% Ru), TMS-138, and TMS-174, the latter two containing 6% rhenium. Fountain pen nibs are frequently tipped with ruthenium alloy. From 1944 onward, the Parker 51 fountain pen was fitted with the "RU" nib, a 14K gold nib tipped with 96.2% ruthenium and 3.8% iridium.

Ruthenium is a component of mixed-metal oxide (MMO) anodes used for cathodic protection of underground and submerged structures, and for electrolytic cells for such processes as generating chlorine from salt water. The fluorescence of some ruthenium complexes is quenched by oxygen, finding use in optode sensors for oxygen. Ruthenium red, [(NH_{3})_{5}Ru−O−Ru(NH_{3})_{4}−O−Ru(NH_{3})_{5}]^{6+}, is a biological stain used to stain polyanionic molecules such as pectin and nucleic acids for light microscopy and electron microscopy. The beta-decaying isotope 106 of ruthenium is used in radiotherapy of eye tumors, mainly melanomas of the uvea. Ruthenium-centered complexes are being researched for possible anticancer properties. The "piano-stool" Ru(II) compounds show promise to replace current platinum-based anti-tumor drugs.

Ruthenium tetroxide exposes latent fingerprints by reacting on contact with fatty oils or fats with sebaceous contaminants and producing brown/black ruthenium dioxide pigment.

=== Electronics ===
Electronics is the largest use of ruthenium. Ru metal is particularly non-volatile, which is advantageous in microelectronic devices. Ru and its main oxide RuO_{2} have comparable electrical resistivities. Copper can be directly electroplated onto ruthenium, particular applications include barrier layers, transistor gates, and interconnects. Ru films can be deposited by chemical vapor deposition using volatile complexes such as ruthenium tetroxide and the organoruthenium compound (cyclohexadiene)Ru(CO)_{3}.

=== Catalysis ===
Many ruthenium-containing compounds exhibit useful catalytic properties. Solutions containing ruthenium trichloride are highly active for olefin metathesis. Such catalysts are used commercially for the production of polynorbornene for example. Well defined ruthenium carbene and alkylidene complexes show similar reactivity but are only used on small-scale. The Grubbs' catalysts, for example, have been employed in the preparation of drugs and advanced materials.

RuCl_{3}-catalyzed ring-opening metathesis polymerization reaction giving polynorbornene

Some ruthenium complexes are highly active catalysts for transfer hydrogenations (sometimes referred to as "borrowing hydrogen" reactions). Chiral ruthenium complexes, introduced by Ryoji Noyori, are employed for the enantioselective hydrogenation of ketones, aldehydes, and imines. A typical catalyst is (cymene)Ru(S,S-TsDPEN): A Nobel Prize in Chemistry was awarded in 2001 to Ryōji Noyori for contributions to the field of asymmetric hydrogenation.

[RuCl(S,S-TsDPEN)(cymene)]-catalysed (R,R)-hydrobenzoin synthesis (yield 100%, ee >99%)

Ruthenium-promoted cobalt catalysts are used in Fischer–Tropsch synthesis.

=== Emerging applications ===
Ruthenium-based compounds are components of dye-sensitized solar cells, which are proposed as low-cost solar cell system.

== Health effects ==
Little is known about the health effects of ruthenium, and it is relatively rare for people to encounter ruthenium compounds. Metallic ruthenium is inert (is not chemically reactive). Some compounds such as ruthenium tetroxide (RuO_{4}) are highly toxic and volatile.

== See also ==
- Airborne radioactivity increase in Europe in autumn 2017

== Bibliography ==
- Greenwood, Norman N.; Earnshaw, Alan (1997). Chemistry of the Elements (2nd ed.). Butterworth-Heinemann. doi:10.1016/C2009-0-30414-6. ISBN 978-0-08-037941-8.
- Haynes, William M., ed. (2016). CRC Handbook of Chemistry and Physics (97th ed.). CRC Press. ISBN 9781498754293.
