= Isotopes of palladium =

Isotopes of palladium (_{46}Pd)
Main isotopes			Decay	
Isotope	abundance	half-life (t_{1/2})	mode	product
^{100}Pd	synth	3.63 d	ε	^{100}Rh
^{102}Pd	1.02%	stable		
^{103}Pd	synth	16.99 d	ε	^{103}Rh
^{104}Pd	11.1%	stable		
^{105}Pd	22.3%	stable		
^{106}Pd	27.3%	stable		
^{107}Pd	trace	6.5×10^{6} y	β^{−}	^{107}Ag
^{108}Pd	26.5%	stable		
^{110}Pd	11.7%	stable		

Standard atomic weight A_{r}°(Pd)
- 106.42±0.01; 106.42±0.01 (abridged)

Natural palladium (_{46}Pd) is composed of six stable isotopes, ^{102}Pd, ^{104}Pd, ^{105}Pd, ^{106}Pd, ^{108}Pd, and ^{110}Pd, although ^{102}Pd and ^{110}Pd are theoretically unstable. The most stable radioisotopes are ^{107}Pd with a half-life of 6.5 million years, ^{103}Pd with a half-life of 16.99 days, and ^{100}Pd with a half-life of 3.63 days. Twenty-five other radioisotopes have been characterized ranging from ^{91}Pd to ^{129}Pd. Most of these have half-lives that are less than 30 minutes except ^{101}Pd (8.47 hours), ^{109}Pd (13.6 hours), and ^{112}Pd (21.0 hours).

The primary decay mode before the most abundant stable isotope, ^{106}Pd, is electron capture and the primary mode after is beta decay. The primary decay product before ^{106}Pd is rhodium and the primary product after is silver.

Radiogenic ^{107}Ag is a decay product of ^{107}Pd and was first discovered in the Santa Clara meteorite of 1978. The discoverers suggest that the coalescence and differentiation of iron-cored small planets may have occurred 10 million years after a nucleosynthetic event. ^{107}Pd versus Ag correlations observed in bodies, which have clearly been melted since accretion of the Solar System, must reflect the presence of short-lived nuclides in the early Solar System.

== List of isotopes ==
Nuclide (Note: ^{m}Pd – Excited nuclear isomer.)	Z	N	Isotopic mass (Da) (Note: ( ) – Uncertainty (1σ) is given in concise form in parentheses after the corresponding last digits.) (Note: # – Atomic mass marked #: value and uncertainty derived not from purely experimental data, but at least partly from trends from the Mass Surface (TMS).)	Discovery year	Half-life (Note: # – Values marked # are not purely derived from experimental data, but at least partly from trends of neighboring nuclides (TNN).)	Decay mode (Note: Modes of decay: EC: / Electron capture; IT: / Isomeric transition; p: / Proton emission)	Daughter isotope (Note: Bold symbol as daughter – Daughter product is stable.)	Spin and parity (Note: ( ) spin value – Indicates spin with weak assignment arguments.)	Natural abundance (mole fraction)	
Nuclide	Excitation energy			Discovery year	Half-life	Decay mode	Daughter isotope	Spin and parity	Normal proportion	Range of variation
^{90}Pd	46	44	89.95737(43)#	2016	10# ms [> 400 ns]	β^{+}?	^{90}Rh	0+		
^{90}Pd	46	44	89.95737(43)#	2016	10# ms [> 400 ns]	β^{+}, p?	^{89}Ru	0+		
^{90}Pd	46	44	89.95737(43)#	2016	10# ms [> 400 ns]	2p?	^{88}Ru	0+		
^{91}Pd	46	45	90.95044(45)#	1995	32(3) ms	β^{+} (96.9%)	^{91}Rh	7/2+#		
^{91}Pd	46	45	90.95044(45)#	1995	32(3) ms	β^{+}, p (3.1%)	^{90}Ru	7/2+#		
^{92}Pd	46	46	91.94119(37)	1994	1.06(3) s	β^{+} (98.4%)	^{92}Rh	0+		
^{92}Pd	46	46	91.94119(37)	1994	1.06(3) s	β^{+}, p (1.6%)	^{91}Ru	0+		
^{93}Pd	46	47	92.93668(40)	1994	1.17(2) s	β^{+} (92.6%)	^{93}Rh	(9/2+)		
^{93}Pd	46	47	92.93668(40)	1994	1.17(2) s	β^{+}, p (7.4%)	^{92}Ru	(9/2+)		
^{94}Pd	46	48	93.9290363(46)	1982	9.1(3) s	β^{+} (>99.87%)	^{94}Rh	0+		
^{94}Pd	46	48	93.9290363(46)	1982	9.1(3) s	β^{+}, p (<0.13%)	^{93}Ru	0+		
^{94m1}Pd	4883.1(4) keV			1995	515(1) ns	IT	^{94}Pd	(14+)		
^{94m2}Pd	7209.8(8) keV			2011	206(18) ns	IT	^{94}Pd	(19−)		
^{95}Pd	46	49	94.9248885(33)	1980	7.4(4) s	β^{+} (99.77%)	^{95}Rh	9/2+#		
^{95}Pd	46	49	94.9248885(33)	1980	7.4(4) s	β^{+}, p (0.23%)	^{94}Ru	9/2+#		
^{95m1}Pd	804(39) keV			2023				(1/2−)		
^{95m2}Pd	1875.13(14) keV			1980	13.3(2) s	β^{+} (88%)	^{95}Rh	(21/2+)		
^{95m2}Pd	1875.13(14) keV			1980	13.3(2) s	IT (11%)	^{95}Pd	(21/2+)		
^{95m2}Pd	1875.13(14) keV			1980	13.3(2) s	β^{+}, p (0.71%)	^{94}Ru	(21/2+)		
^{96}Pd	46	50	95.9182137(45)	1980	122(2) s	β^{+}	^{96}Rh	0+		
^{96m}Pd	2530.57(23) keV			1983	1.804(7) μs	IT	^{96}Pd	8+#		
^{97}Pd	46	51	96.9164720(52)	1969	3.10(9) min	β^{+}	^{97}Rh	5/2+#		
^{98}Pd	46	52	97.9126983(51)	1955	17.7(4) min	β^{+}	^{98}Rh	0+		
^{99}Pd	46	53	98.9117731(55)	1955	21.4(2) min	β^{+}	^{99}Rh	(5/2)+		
^{100}Pd	46	54	99.908520(19)	1948	3.63(9) d	EC	^{100}Rh	0+		
^{101}Pd	46	55	100.9082848(49)	1948	8.47(6) h	β^{+}	^{101}Rh	5/2+		
^{102}Pd	46	56	101.90563229(45)	1935	Observationally Stable (Note: Believed to decay by β^{+}β^{+} to ^{102}Ru with a half-life over 7.6×10^{18} y)			0+	0.0102(1)	
^{103}Pd	46	57	102.90611107(94)	1950	16.991(19) d	EC	^{103}Rh	5/2+		
^{104}Pd	46	58	103.9040304(14)	1935	Stable			0+	0.1114(8)	
^{105}Pd (Note: Fission product)	46	59	104.9050795(12)	1935	Stable			5/2+	0.2233(8)	
^{105m}Pd	489.1(3) keV			1958	35.5(5) μs	IT	^{105}Pd	11/2−		
^{106}Pd	46	60	105.9034803(12)	1935	Stable			0+	0.2733(3)	
^{107}Pd (Note: Long-lived fission product)	46	61	106.9051281(13)	1958	6.5(3)×10^{6} y	β^{−}	^{107}Ag	5/2+	trace (Note: Cosmogenic nuclide, also found as nuclear contamination)	
^{107m1}Pd	115.74(12) keV			1969	0.85(10) μs	IT	^{107}Pd	1/2+		
^{107m2}Pd	214.6(3) keV			1958	21.3(5) s	IT	^{107}Pd	11/2−		
^{108}Pd	46	62	107.9038918(12)	1935	Stable			0+	0.2646(9)	
^{109}Pd	46	63	108.9059506(12)	1937	13.59(12) h	β^{−}	^{109}Ag	5/2+		
^{109m1}Pd	113.4000(14) keV			1978	380(50) ns	IT	^{109}Pd	1/2+		
^{109m2}Pd	188.9903(10) keV			1957	4.703(9) min	IT	^{109}Pd	11/2−		
^{110}Pd	46	64	109.90517288(66)	1935	Observationally Stable (Note: Believed to decay by β^{−}β^{−} to ^{110}Cd with a half-life over 2.9×10^{20} years)			0+	0.1172(9)	
^{111}Pd	46	65	110.90769036(79)	1937	23.56(9) min	β^{−}	^{111}Ag	5/2+		
^{111m}Pd	172.18(8) keV			1960	5.563(13) h	IT (76.8%)	^{111}Pd	11/2−		
^{111m}Pd	172.18(8) keV			1960	5.563(13) h	β^{−} (23.2%)	^{111}Ag	11/2−		
^{112}Pd	46	66	111.9073306(70)	1951	21.04(17) h	β^{−}	^{112}Ag	0+		
^{113}Pd	46	67	112.9102619(75)	1954	93(5) s	β^{−}	^{113}Ag	(5/2+)		
^{113m}Pd	81.1(3) keV			1993	0.3(1) s	IT	^{113}Pd	(9/2−)		
^{114}Pd	46	68	113.9103694(75)	1958	2.42(6) min	β^{−}	^{114}Ag	0+		
^{115}Pd	46	69	114.9136650(19)	1958	25(2) s	β^{−}	^{115}Ag	(1/2)+		
^{115m}Pd	86.8(29) keV			1990	50(3) s	β^{−} (92.0%)	^{115}Ag	(7/2−)		
^{115m}Pd	86.8(29) keV			1990	50(3) s	IT (8.0%)	^{115}Pd	(7/2−)		
^{116}Pd	46	70	115.9142979(77)	1970	11.8(4) s	β^{−}	^{116}Ag	0+		
^{117}Pd	46	71	116.9179556(78)	1968	4.3(3) s	β^{−}	^{117}Ag	(3/2+)		
^{117m}Pd	203.3(3) keV			1991	19.1(7) ms	IT	^{117}Pd	(9/2−)		
^{118}Pd	46	72	117.9190673(27)	1969	1.9(1) s	β^{−}	^{118}Ag	0+		
^{119}Pd	46	73	118.9231238(45)	1991	0.88(2) s	β^{−}	^{119}Ag	1/2+, 3/2+		
^{119}Pd	46	73	118.9231238(45)	1991	0.88(2) s	β^{−}, n?	^{118}Ag	1/2+, 3/2+		
^{119m}Pd	199.1(30) keV			2022	0.85(1) s	IT	^{119}Pd	(11/2−)		
^{120}Pd	46	74	119.9245517(25)	1993	492(33) ms	β^{−} (>99.3%)	^{120}Ag	0+		
^{120}Pd	46	74	119.9245517(25)	1993	492(33) ms	β^{−}, n (<0.7%)	^{119}Ag	0+		
^{121}Pd	46	75	120.9289513(40)	1994	290(1) ms	β^{−} (>99.2%)	^{121}Ag	3/2+#		
^{121}Pd	46	75	120.9289513(40)	1994	290(1) ms	β^{−}, n (<0.8%)	^{120}Ag	3/2+#		
^{121m1}Pd	135.5(5) keV			2012	460(90) ns	IT	^{121}Pd	7/2+#		
^{121m2}Pd	160(14) keV			2012	460(90) ns	IT	^{121}Pd	11/2−#		
^{122}Pd	46	76	121.930632(21)	1994	193(5) ms	β^{−}	^{122}Ag	0+		
^{122}Pd	46	76	121.930632(21)	1994	193(5) ms	β^{−}, n (<2.5%)	^{121}Ag	0+		
^{123}Pd	46	77	122.93531(10)	1994	108(1) ms	β^{−} (90%)	^{123}Ag	3/2+#		
^{123}Pd	46	77	122.93531(10)	1994	108(1) ms	β^{−}, n (10%)	^{122}Ag	3/2+#		
^{123m}Pd	100(50)# keV			(2019) (Note: Half-life not measured, not included in the discovery database)	100# ms	β^{−}	^{123}Ag	11/2−#		
^{123m}Pd	100(50)# keV			(2019)	100# ms	IT?	^{123}Pd	11/2−#		
^{124}Pd	46	78	123.93731(32)#	1997	88(15) ms	β^{−} (83%)	^{124}Ag	0+		
^{124}Pd	46	78	123.93731(32)#	1997	88(15) ms	β^{−}, n (17%)	^{123}Ag	0+		
^{124m}Pd	1000(800)# keV			2012	> 20 μs	IT	^{124}Pd	11/2−#		
^{125}Pd	46	79	124.94207(43)#	2008	60(6) ms	β^{−} (88%)	^{125}Ag	3/2+#		
^{125}Pd	46	79	124.94207(43)#	2008	60(6) ms	β^{−}, n (12%)	^{124}Ag	3/2+#		
^{125m1}Pd	100(50)# keV			(2019)	50# ms	β^{−}	^{125}Ag	11/2−#		
^{125m1}Pd	100(50)# keV			(2019)	50# ms	IT?	^{125}Pd	11/2−#		
^{125m2}Pd	1805.23(18) keV			2019	144(4) ns	IT	^{125}Pd	(23/2+)		
^{126}Pd	46	80	125.94440(43)#	2008	48.6(8) ms	β^{−} (78%)	^{126}Ag	0+		
^{126}Pd	46	80	125.94440(43)#	2008	48.6(8) ms	β^{−}, n (22%)	^{125}Ag	0+		
^{126m1}Pd	2023.5(7) keV			2013	330(40) ns	IT	^{126}Pd	(5−)		
^{126m2}Pd	2109.7(9) keV			2013	440(30) ns	IT	^{126}Pd	(7−)		
^{126m3}Pd	2406.0(10) keV			2014	23.0(8) ms	β^{−} (72%)	^{126}Ag	(10+)		
^{126m3}Pd	2406.0(10) keV			2014	23.0(8) ms	IT (28%)	^{126}Pd	(10+)		
^{127}Pd	46	81	126.94931(54)#	2010	38(2) ms	β^{−} (>81%)	^{127}Ag	11/2−#		
^{127}Pd	46	81	126.94931(54)#	2010	38(2) ms	β^{−}, n (<19%)	^{126}Ag	11/2−#		
^{127}Pd	46	81	126.94931(54)#	2010	38(2) ms	β^{−}, 2n?	^{125}Ag	11/2−#		
^{127m}Pd	1717.91(23) keV			2019	39(6) μs	IT	^{127}Pd	(19/2+)		
^{128}Pd	46	82	127.95235(54)#	2010	35(3) ms	β^{−}	^{128}Ag	0+		
^{128}Pd	46	82	127.95235(54)#	2010	35(3) ms	β^{−}, n?	^{127}Ag	0+		
^{128m}Pd	2151.0(10) keV			2013	5.8(8) μs	IT	^{128}Pd	(8+)		
^{129}Pd	46	83	128.95933(64)#	2015	31(7) ms	β^{−}	^{129}Ag	7/2−#		
^{129}Pd	46	83	128.95933(64)#	2015	31(7) ms	β^{−}, n?	^{128}Ag	7/2−#		
^{129}Pd	46	83	128.95933(64)#	2015	31(7) ms	β^{−}, 2n?	^{127}Ag	7/2−#		
^{130}Pd	46	84	129.96486(32)#	2018	27# ms [> 550 ns]	β^{−}	^{130}Ag	0+		
^{130}Pd	46	84	129.96486(32)#	2018	27# ms [> 550 ns]	β^{−}, n?	^{129}Ag	0+		
^{130}Pd	46	84	129.96486(32)#	2018	27# ms [> 550 ns]	β^{−}, 2n?	^{128}Ag	0+		
^{131}Pd	46	85	130.97237(32)#	2018	20# ms [> 550 ns]	β^{−}	^{131}Ag	7/2−#		
^{131}Pd	46	85	130.97237(32)#	2018	20# ms [> 550 ns]	β^{−}, n?	^{130}Ag	7/2−#		
^{131}Pd	46	85	130.97237(32)#	2018	20# ms [> 550 ns]	β^{−}, 2n?	^{129}Ag	7/2−#		
This table header & footer:

== Palladium-103 ==
Palladium-103 is a radioisotope of the element palladium that has uses in brachytherapy for prostate cancer and uveal melanoma. Palladium-103 may be created from palladium-102, or from rhodium-103 using a cyclotron. Palladium-103 has a half-life of 16.99 days and decays by electron capture to an excited state of rhodium-103, which undergoes internal conversion to eject an electron. The resulting electron vacancy leads to emission of characteristic X-rays with 20–23 keV of energy.

== Palladium-107 ==
Long-lived fission products
Nuclide	t_{1/2}	Yield	Q (Note: Decay energy is split among β, neutrino, and γ if any.)	βγ
	(Ma)	(%) (Note: Per 65 thermal neutron fissions of ^{235}U and 35 of ^{239}Pu.)	(keV)	
^{99}Tc	0.211	6.1385	294	β
^{126}Sn	0.23	0.1084	4050 (Note: Has decay energy 380 keV, but its decay product ^{126}Sb has decay energy 3.67 MeV.)	βγ
^{79}Se	0.33	0.0447	151	β
^{135}Cs	1.33	6.9110 (Note: Lower in thermal reactors because ^{135}Xe, its predecessor, readily absorbs neutrons.)	269	β
^{93}Zr	1.61	5.4575	91	βγ
^{107}Pd	6.5	1.2499	33	β
^{129}I	16.1	0.8410	194	βγ

Palladium-107 is the second-longest lived (half-life of 6.5 million years) and least radioactive (decay energy only 33 keV, specific activity 5×10^{−5} Ci/g) of the 7 long-lived fission products. It undergoes pure beta decay (without gamma radiation) to ^{107}Ag, which is stable.

Its yield from thermal neutron fission of uranium-235 is 0.14% per fission, only 1/4 that of iodine-129, and only 1/40 those of ^{99}Tc, ^{93}Zr, and ^{135}Cs. Yield from ^{233}U is slightly lower, but yield from ^{239}Pu is much higher, 3.2%. Fast fission or fission of some heavier actinides^{[which?]} will produce palladium-107 at higher yields.

One source estimates that palladium produced from fission contains the isotopes ^{104}Pd (16.9%),^{105}Pd (29.3%), ^{106}Pd (21.3%), ^{107}Pd (17%), ^{108}Pd (11.7%) and ^{110}Pd (3.8%). According to another source, the proportion of ^{107}Pd is 9.2% for palladium from thermal neutron fission of ^{235}U, 11.8% for ^{233}U, and 20.4% for ^{239}Pu (and the ^{239}Pu yield of palladium is about 10 times that of ^{235}U).

Because of this dilution and because ^{105}Pd has 11 times the neutron absorption cross section, ^{107}Pd is not amenable to disposal by nuclear transmutation. However, as a noble metal, palladium is not as mobile in the environment as iodine or technetium. These characteristic are shared with ^{93}Zr among the LLFPs.

== See also ==
Daughter products other than palladium

- Isotopes of silver
- Isotopes of rhodium
- Isotopes of ruthenium
