= Rhodium =

Rhodium, _{45}Rh
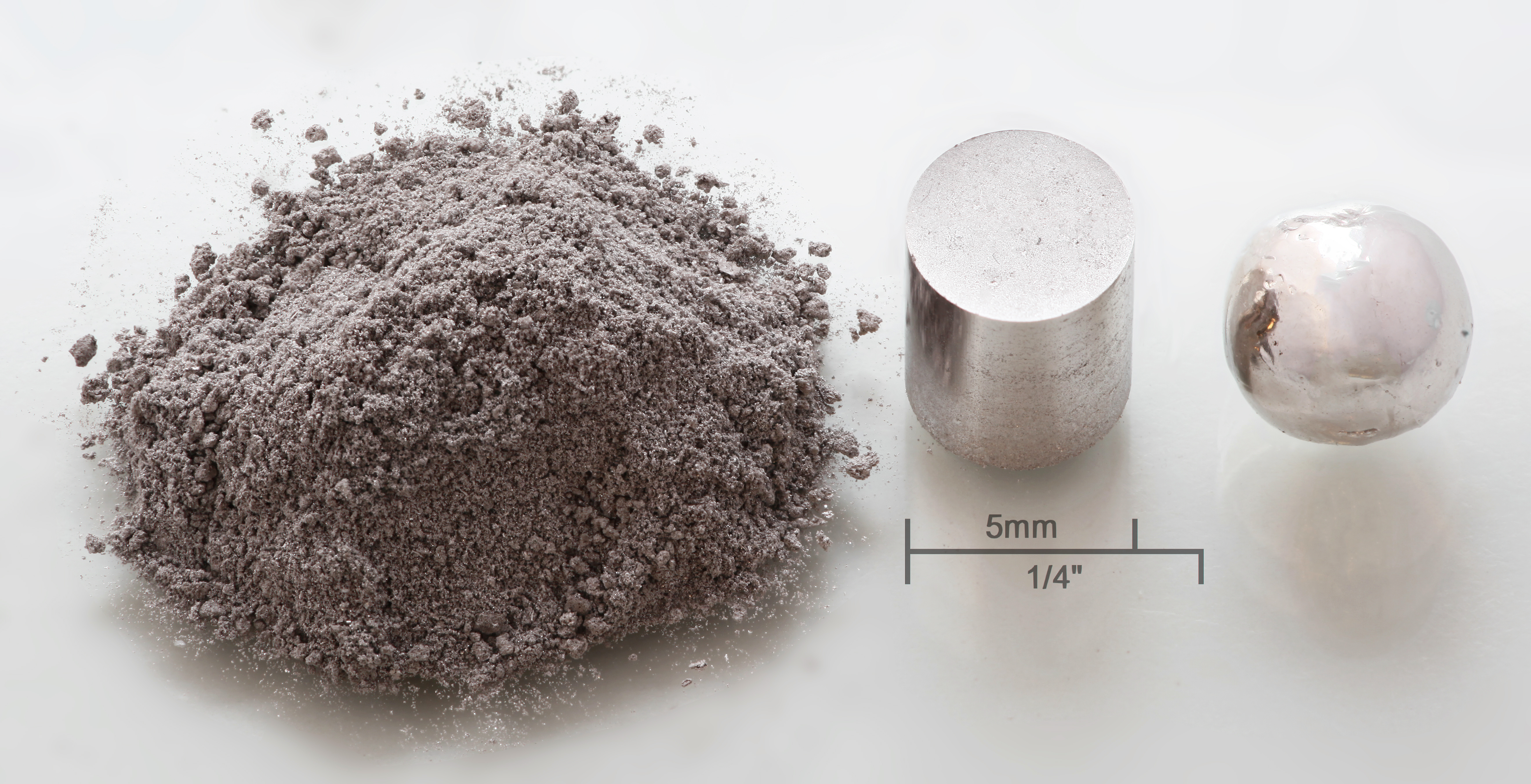

Rhodium
- Pronunciation: /ˈroʊdiəm/ (ROH-dee-əm)
- Appearance: Silvery white metallic

Standard atomic weight A_{r}°(Rh)
- 102.90549±0.00002; 102.91±0.01 (abridged)

Rhodium in the periodic table
Hydrogen																															Helium
Lithium	Beryllium																									Boron	Carbon	Nitrogen	Oxygen	Fluorine	Neon
Sodium	Magnesium																									Aluminium	Silicon	Phosphorus	Sulfur	Chlorine	Argon
Potassium	Calcium															Scandium	Titanium	Vanadium	Chromium	Manganese	Iron	Cobalt	Nickel	Copper	Zinc	Gallium	Germanium	Arsenic	Selenium	Bromine	Krypton
Rubidium	Strontium															Yttrium	Zirconium	Niobium	Molybdenum	Technetium	Ruthenium	Rhodium	Palladium	Silver	Cadmium	Indium	Tin	Antimony	Tellurium	Iodine	Xenon
Caesium	Barium	Lanthanum	Cerium	Praseodymium	Neodymium	Promethium	Samarium	Europium	Gadolinium	Terbium	Dysprosium	Holmium	Erbium	Thulium	Ytterbium	Lutetium	Hafnium	Tantalum	Tungsten	Rhenium	Osmium	Iridium	Platinum	Gold	Mercury (element)	Thallium	Lead	Bismuth	Polonium	Astatine	Radon
Francium	Radium	Actinium	Thorium	Protactinium	Uranium	Neptunium	Plutonium	Americium	Curium	Berkelium	Californium	Einsteinium	Fermium	Mendelevium	Nobelium	Lawrencium	Rutherfordium	Dubnium	Seaborgium	Bohrium	Hassium	Meitnerium	Darmstadtium	Roentgenium	Copernicium	Nihonium	Flerovium	Moscovium	Livermorium	Tennessine	Oganesson
Co
↑
Rh
↓
Ir
ruthenium ← rhodium → palladium
- Atomic number (Z): 45
- Group: group 9
- Period: period 5
- Block: d-block
- Electron configuration: [Kr] 4d^{8} 5s^{1}
- Electrons per shell: 2, 8, 18, 16, 1

Physical properties
- Phase at STP: solid
- Melting point: 2237 K (1964 °C, 3567 °F)
- Boiling point: 3968 K (3695 °C, 6683 °F)
- Density (at 20° C): 12.423 g/cm^{3}
- when liquid (at m.p.): 10.7 g/cm^{3}
- Heat of fusion: 26.59 kJ/mol
- Heat of vaporization: 493 kJ/mol
- Molar heat capacity: 24.98 J/(mol·K)
- Specific heat capacity: 242.736 J/(kg·K)
Vapor pressure
P (Pa)	1	10	100	1 k	10 k	100 k
at T (K)	2288	2496	2749	3063	3405	3997

Atomic properties
- Oxidation states: common: +3 −3, −1, 0, +1, +2, +4, +5, +6, +7
- Electronegativity: Pauling scale: 2.28
- Ionization energies: 1st: 719.7 kJ/mol; 2nd: 1740 kJ/mol; 3rd: 2997 kJ/mol
- Atomic radius: empirical: 134 pm
- Covalent radius: 142±7 pm
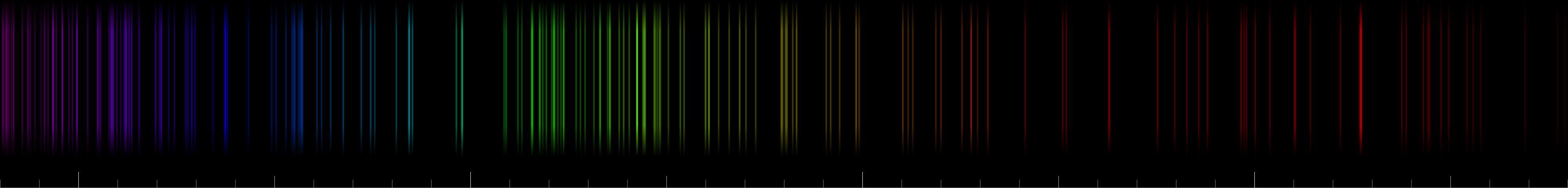
- Spectral lines of rhodium

Other properties
- Natural occurrence: primordial
- Crystal structure: face-centered cubic (fcc) (cF4)
- Lattice constant: a = 380.34 pm (at 20 °C)
- Thermal expansion: 8.46×10^{−6}/K (at 20 °C)
- Thermal conductivity: 150 W/(m⋅K)
- Electrical resistivity: 43.3 nΩ⋅m (at 0 °C)
- Magnetic ordering: paramagnetic
- Molar magnetic susceptibility: +111.0×10^{−6} cm^{3}/mol (298 K)
- Young's modulus: 380 GPa
- Shear modulus: 150 GPa
- Bulk modulus: 275 GPa
- Speed of sound thin rod: 4700 m/s (at 20 °C)
- Poisson ratio: 0.26
- Mohs hardness: 6.0
- Vickers hardness: 1100–8000 MPa
- Brinell hardness: 980–1350 MPa
- CAS Number: 7440-16-6

History
- Naming: from Greek ῥόδον, 'rose', for the color of one of its chlorine compounds
- Discovery and first isolation: William Hyde Wollaston (1804)

Isotopes of rhodium
Main isotopes			Decay	
Isotope	abundance	half-life (t_{1/2})	mode	product
^{99}Rh	synth	16.1 d	β^{+}	^{99}Ru
^{100}Rh	synth	20.8 h	β^{+}	^{100}Ru
^{101}Rh	synth	4.07 y	ε	^{101}Ru
^{101m}Rh	synth	4.343 d	ε	^{101}Ru
^{101m}Rh	synth	4.343 d	IT	^{101}Rh
^{102}Rh	synth	207 d	β^{+}	^{102}Ru
^{102}Rh	synth	207 d	β^{−}	^{102}Pd
^{102m}Rh	synth	3.742 y	β^{+}	^{102}Ru
^{102m}Rh	synth	3.742 y	IT	^{102}Rh
^{103}Rh	100%	stable		
^{105}Rh	synth	35.34 h	β^{−}	^{105}Pd

Rhodium is a chemical element; it has symbol Rh and atomic number 45. It is a very rare, silvery-white, hard, corrosion-resistant transition metal. It is a noble metal and a member of the platinum group. It has only one naturally occurring isotope, which is ^{103}Rh. Naturally occurring rhodium is usually found as a free metal or as an alloy with similar metals and rarely as a chemical compound, in minerals such as bowieite and rhodplumsite. It is one of the rarest and most valuable precious metals. Rhodium is a group 9 element (cobalt group).

Rhodium is found in platinum or nickel ores with the other members of the platinum group metals. It was discovered in 1803 by William Hyde Wollaston in one such ore, and named for the rose color of one of its chlorine compounds.

The element's major use (consuming about 80% of world rhodium production) is as one of the catalysts in the three-way catalytic converters in automobiles. Because rhodium metal is inert against corrosion and most aggressive chemicals, and because of its rarity, rhodium is usually alloyed with platinum or palladium and applied in high-temperature and corrosion-resistant coatings. White gold jewelry is often plated with a thin rhodium layer to provide a bright reflective appearance, while sterling silver is rhodium plated to resist tarnishing.

Rhodium detectors are used in nuclear reactors to measure the neutron flux level. Other uses of rhodium include asymmetric hydrogenation used to form drug precursors and the processes for the production of acetic acid.

== History ==
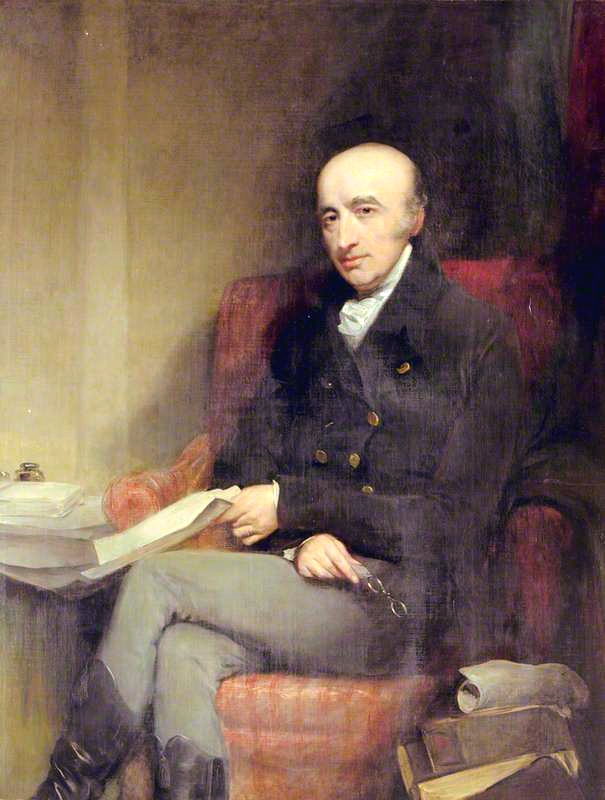
William Hyde Wollaston

Rhodium (from Greek: ῥόδον rhodon, meaning 'rose') was discovered in 1803 by William Hyde Wollaston, soon after he discovered palladium. He used crude platinum ore presumably obtained from South America. His procedure started by dissolving the ore in aqua regia, precipitating the platinum as ammonium chloroplatinate by adding ammonium chloride (NH_{4}Cl). Adding zinc precipitated a mixture of copper, lead, palladium, and rhodium. Dilute nitric acid dissolved the copper and lead. Dissolving the remainder in aqua regia again and adding sodium chloride, the solution was evaporated to yield rose-red Na_{3}[RhCl_{6}]·nH_{2}O. After extraction with hot ethanol, additional zinc displaced the rhodium in the ionic compound, releasing the rhodium as free metal.

For decades, the rare element had only minor applications; for example, by the turn of the century, rhodium-containing thermocouples were used to measure temperatures up to 1800 °C. They have exceptionally good stability in the temperature range of 1300 to 1800 °C.

The first major application was electroplating for decorative uses and as corrosion-resistant coating. The introduction of the three-way catalytic converter by Volvo in 1976 increased the demand for rhodium. The previous catalytic converters used platinum or palladium, while the three-way catalytic converter used rhodium to reduce the amount of NO_{x} in the exhaust.

== Characteristics ==
Rhodium is a hard, silvery, durable metal that has a high reflectance. Rhodium metal does not normally form an oxide, even when heated. Oxygen is absorbed from the atmosphere only at the melting point of rhodium, but is released on solidification. Rhodium has both a higher melting point and lower density than platinum. It is not attacked by most acids: it is completely insoluble in nitric acid and dissolves slightly in aqua regia, a property that has been used to separate it from platinum ore.

Rhodium belongs to group 9 of the periodic table, but exhibits an atypical ground state valence electron configuration for that group, having only one electron in its outermost s orbital. This is also observed in the elements niobium (41) and ruthenium (44).

=== Chemical properties ===
Oxidation states of rhodium
+0	Rh_{4}(CO)_{12}
+1	RhCl(P(C_{6}H_{5})_{3}
+2	Rh_{2}(O_{2}CCH_{3})_{4}
+3	RhCl_{3}, Rh_{2}O_{3}
+4	RhO_{2}
+5	RhF_{5}, Sr_{3}LiRhO_{6}
+6	RhF_{6}

The common oxidation states of rhodium are +3 and +1. Complexes with rhodium in oxidation states 0, +2, and +4 are also well characterized. The few compounds at still higher oxidation states include rhodium pentafluoride, a tetrameric complex with the true formula Rh_{4}F_{20}), and rhodium hexafluoride.

Three rhodium oxides are Rh_{2}O_{3} (a paramagnetic black powder), RhO_{2} (black when anhydrous but green as a hydrate), and RhO_{3} (only stable in the gas phase). A rhodium sulfide, Rh_{17}S_{15}, occurs naturally as a rare mineral miassite. Synthetic Rh_{x}S_{y} are used as catalysts in for example H_{2}-Br_{2} fuel cells.

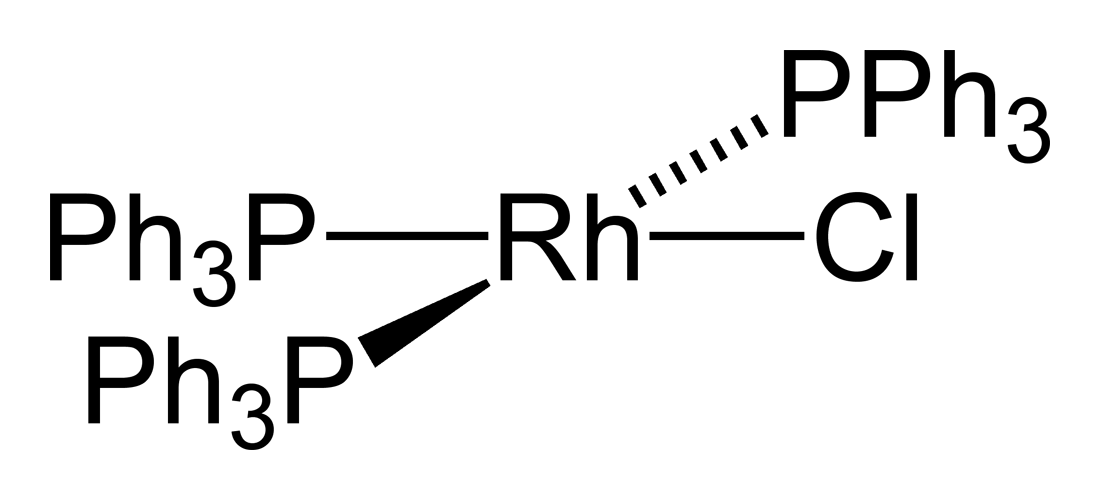
Structure of Wilkinson's catalyst (Ph = phenyl = C_{6}H_{5}).

All the Rh(III) halides are known. Synthesis of many rhodium complexes begin with RhCl_{3}·3H_{2}O, the hydrated trichloride, but RhCl_{3}, the anhydrous form, is largely inert. Other rhodium(III) chlorides include sodium hexachlororhodate, Na_{3}RhCl_{6}, and pentaamminechlororhodium dichloride, [Rh(NH_{3})_{5}Cl]Cl_{2}. They are used in the recycling and purification of this very expensive metal. Heating a methanolic solution of hydrated rhodium trichloride with sodium acetate gives the blue-green rhodium(II) acetate, Rh_{2}(O_{2}CCH_{3})_{4}, which features a Rh–Rh bond. This complex and related rhodium(II) trifluoroacetate have attracted attention as catalysts for cyclopropanation reactions.

Heating treated with triphenylphosphine in ethanol, hydrated rhodium trichloride converts to RhCl(P(C_{6}H_{5})_{3})_{3}. This square planar complex, which is known as Wilkinson's catalyst, is a common and early example of a well-defined homogeneous catalyst for hydrogenation of alkenes.

==== Organorhodium compounds ====
Rhodium is known for its many organometallic derivatives. Rhodium(I) complexes are commonly used as catalysis, with a few being BINAP-Rh(I), DIPAMP-Rh(I), and BDPP-Rh(I).

Cyclopentadienyl complexes of rhodium have been investigated as analogues of ferrocene. The parent is rhodocene, which participates in an unusual monomer-dimer equilibrium:

Related cyclopentadienyl compounds include the Rh(I) and Rh(III) half-sandwich complexes (C_{5}H_{5})Rh(CO)_{2} and Pentamethylcyclopentadienyl rhodium dichloride dimer (C_{5}(CH_{3})_{5}RhCl_{2})_{2}. The latter compound is prepared by the reaction of rhodium trichloride trihydrate and pentamethylcyclopentadiene in hot methanol.

A related but cationic family of hydrogenation catalysts arise from cyclooctadiene rhodium chloride dimer, Rh_{2}Cl_{2}(C_{8}H_{12})_{2}. The cyclooctadiene (C_{8}H_{12}) ligands are easily displaced, and this allows the easy introduction of chiral ligands, leading to asymmetric hydrogenations, including the Nobel Prize-winning route to the chiral drug L-DOPA.

When treated with sodium borohydride and carbon monoxide, RhCl(P(C_{6}H_{5})_{3})_{3} converts to the pentacoordinate complex RhH(CO)(P(C_{6}H_{5})_{3})_{3}, which is used commercially for the hydroformylation of alkenes. Despite its much higher cost, tris(triphenylphosphine)rhodium carbonyl hydride has displaced cheaper cobalt-based catalysts for this application.

=== Isotopes ===
Temperature-controlled equilibrium between rhodocene and its dimer

Naturally occurring rhodium is composed of only one isotope, ^{103}Rh. With a nuclear spin of -1/2, ^{103}Rh is well-suited for nuclear magnetic resonance spectroscopic studies. With a particularly low nuclear dipole moment, ^{103}Rh exhibits very low receptivity.

The most stable radioisotopes are ^{101}Rh with a half-life of 4.07 years, ^{102}Rh with a half-life of 207 days, and ^{99}Rh with a half-life of 16.1 days. Thirty-eight other radioisotopes have been characterized ranging from ^{90}Rh to ^{128}Rh; these have half-lives that are less than an hour except ^{100}Rh (20.8 hours) and ^{105}Rh (35.34 hours). Numerous meta states are also known, of which the most stable are ^{102m}Rh (3.742 years) and ^{101m}Rh (4.343 days).

In isotopes lighter than ^{103}Rh (the stable isotope), the primary decay mode is electron capture and the primary decay product is ruthenium. In isotopes heavier than ^{103}Rh, the primary decay mode is beta emission and the primary product is palladium.

== Occurrence ==
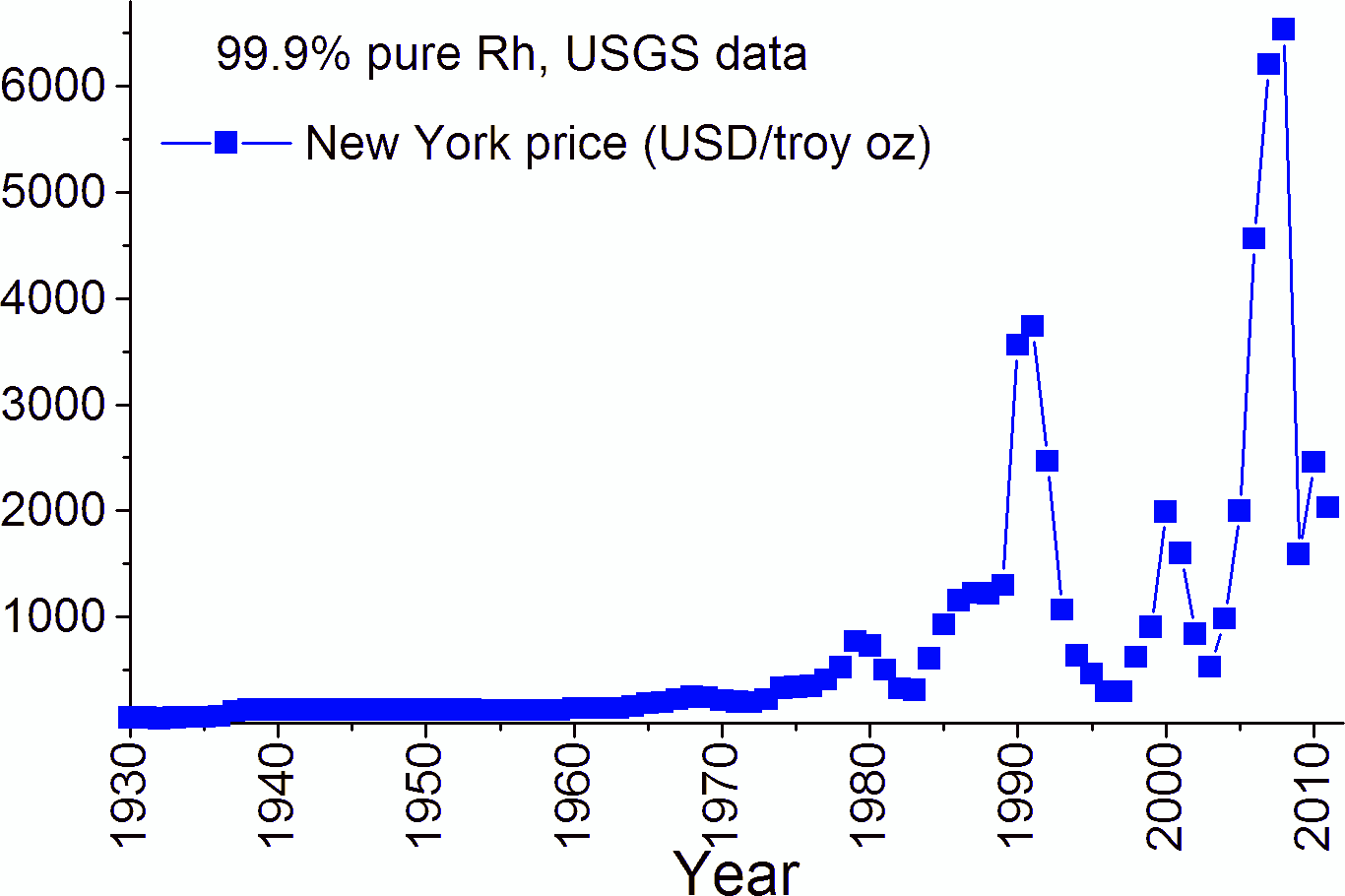
Rh price evolution

Rhodium is one of the rarest elements in the Earth's crust, with less than one part per billion. Its rarity affects its price and its use in commercial applications. The concentration of rhodium in nickel meteorites is typically 1 part per billion. Rhodium has been measured in some potatoes with concentrations between 0.8 and 30 ppt.

=== Mining and price ===
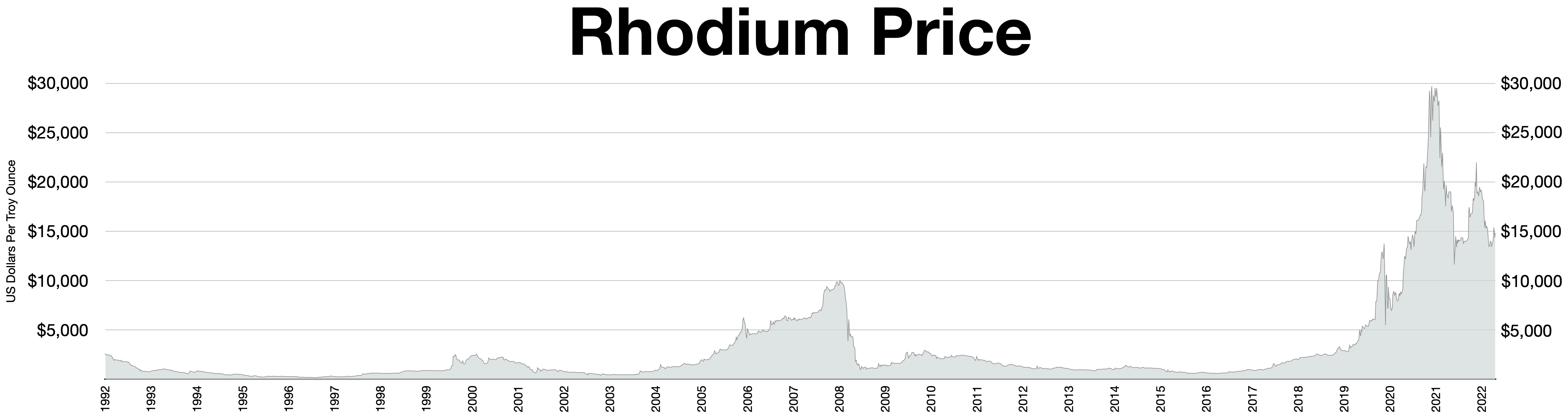
Rhodium daily price 1992–2022

Rhodium ores are a mixture with other metals such as palladium, silver, platinum, and gold. Few rhodium minerals are known. The separation of rhodium from the other metals poses significant challenges. Principal production is located in South Africa, which supplied 557,000 of the 681,000 troy ounces (about 81%) of rhodium mined in 2026, with much less production in Russia (55,000 oz). Around 339,000 troy ounces were recovered from spent autocatalysts. The price of rhodium in 2025 varied between $5000 per troy ounce early in the year to $9000 by December.

=== Used nuclear fuels ===
Rhodium is a fission product of uranium-235: each kilogram of fission product contains a significant amount of the lighter platinum group metals. Used nuclear fuel is therefore a potential source of rhodium, but the extraction is complex and expensive, and the presence of rhodium radioisotopes requires a period of cooling storage for multiple half-lives of the longest-lived isotope (^{101}Rh with a half-life of 3.3 years, and ^{102m}Rh with a half-life of 2.9 years), or about 10 years. These factors make the source unattractive and no large-scale extraction has been attempted.

== Applications ==
The primary use of this element is in automobiles as a catalytic converter, changing harmful unburned hydrocarbons, carbon monoxide, and nitrogen oxide exhaust emissions into less noxious gases. Of 30,000 kg of rhodium consumed worldwide in 2012, 81% (24,300 kg) went into this application, and 8,060 kg was recovered from old converters. About 964 kg of rhodium was used in the glass industry, mostly for production of fiberglass and flat-panel glass, and 2,520 kg was used in the chemical industry.

In 2008, net demand (with the recycling accounted for) of rhodium for automotive converters made up 84% of the world usage, with the number fluctuating around 80% in 2015−2021.

=== Carbonylation ===
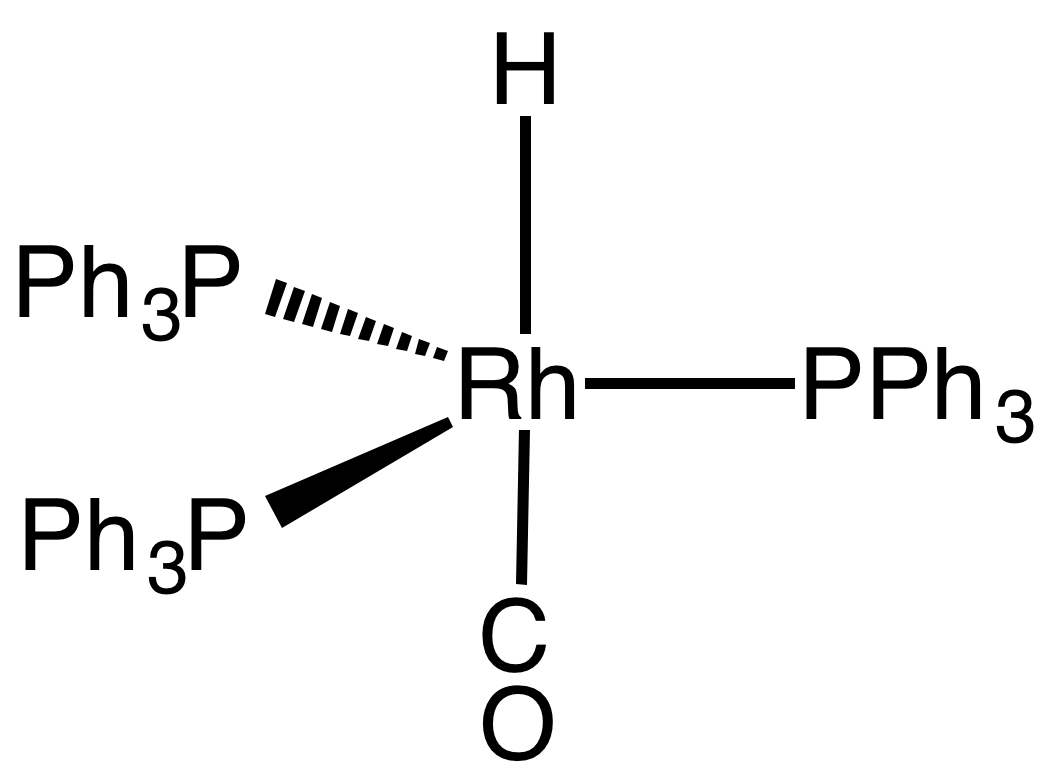
Tris(triphenylphosphine)rhodium carbonyl hydride, a widely used catalyst for hydroformylation (Ph = C_{6}H_{5})

Rhodium catalysts are used in some industrial processes, notably those involving carbon monoxide. In the Monsanto process, rhodium iodides catalyze the carbonylation of methanol to produce acetic acid. This technology has been significantly displaced by the iridium-based Cativa process, which effects the same conversion but more efficiently. Rhodium-based complexes are the dominant catalysts for hydroformylation, which converts alkenes to aldehydes according to the following equation:

RCH=CH_{2} + H_{2} + CO → RCH_{2}−CH_{2}CHO

Rh-based hydroformylation underpins the industrial production of products as diverse as detergents, fragrances, and some drugs. Rhodium based catalysts have 1000 to 10000 times higher activity for hydroformylation than cheaper cobalt carbonyl-based catalysts, allowing reactions at lower temperatures and pressures.

Rhodium is also known to catalyze many reactions involving hydrogen gas and hydrosilanes. These include hydrogenations and hydrosilylations of alkenes. Rhodium metal, but not rhodium complexes, catalyzes the hydrogenation of benzene to cyclohexane.

=== Ornamental uses ===
Rhodium finds use in jewelry and for decorations. It is electroplated on white gold and platinum to give it a reflective white surface at time of sale, after which the thin layer wears away with use. This is known as rhodium flashing in the jewelry business. It may also be used in coating sterling silver to protect against tarnish (silver sulfide, Ag_{2}S, produced from atmospheric hydrogen sulfide, H_{2}S). Solid (pure) rhodium jewelry is very rare, more because of the difficulty of fabrication (high melting point and poor malleability) than because of the high price. The high cost ensures that rhodium is typically applied as an electroplate. Rhodium has also been used for honors or to signify elite status, when more commonly used metals such as silver, gold or platinum were deemed insufficient. In 1979 the Guinness Book of World Records gave Paul McCartney a rhodium-plated disc for being history's all-time best-selling songwriter and recording artist.

=== Other uses ===
Rhodium is used as an alloying agent for hardening and improving the corrosion resistance of platinum and palladium. These alloys are used in furnace windings, bushings for glass fiber production, thermocouple elements, electrodes for aircraft spark plugs, and laboratory crucibles. Other uses include electrical contacts, where it is valued for small electrical resistance, small and stable contact resistance, and great corrosion resistance, and filters and anodes in mammography systems that emit a lower radiation dose than comparable systems using molybdenum.

Rhodium plated by either electroplating or evaporation is extremely hard and useful for optical instruments. In automobile manufacturing, rhodium is also used in the construction of headlight reflectors. Rhodium neutron detectors are used in nuclear reactors to measure neutron flux levels—this method requires a digital filter to determine the current neutron flux level, generating three separate signals: immediate, a few seconds delay, and a minute delay, each with its own signal level; all three are combined in the rhodium detector signal. The three Palo Verde nuclear reactors each have 305 rhodium neutron detectors, 61 detectors on each of five vertical levels, providing an accurate 3D "picture" of reactivity and allowing fine tuning to consume the nuclear fuel most economically.

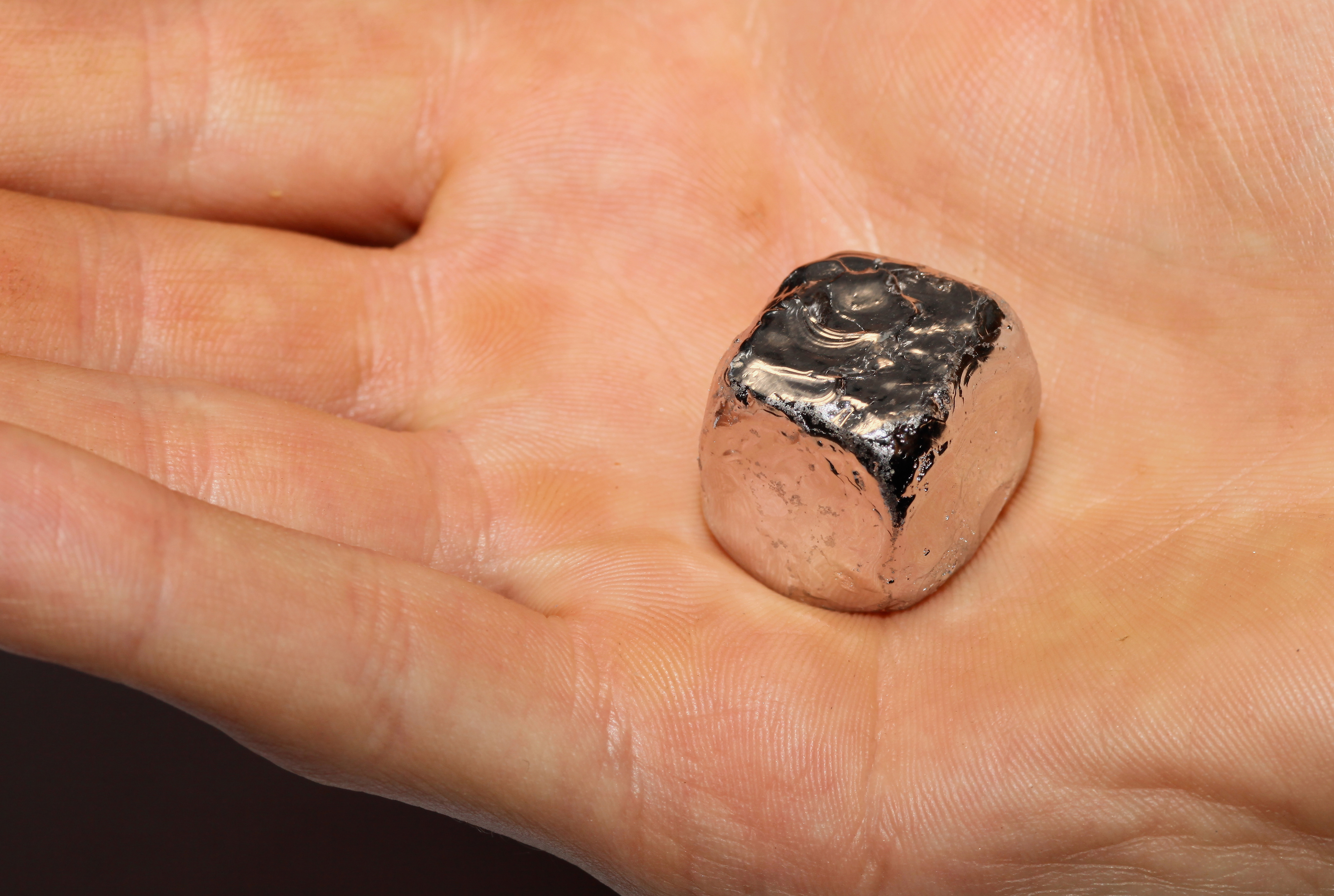
A 78 g sample of rhodium

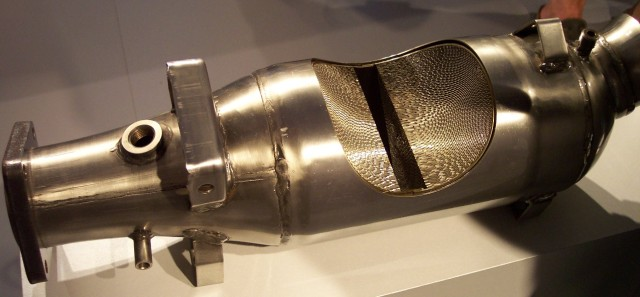
Cut-away of a metal-core catalytic converter

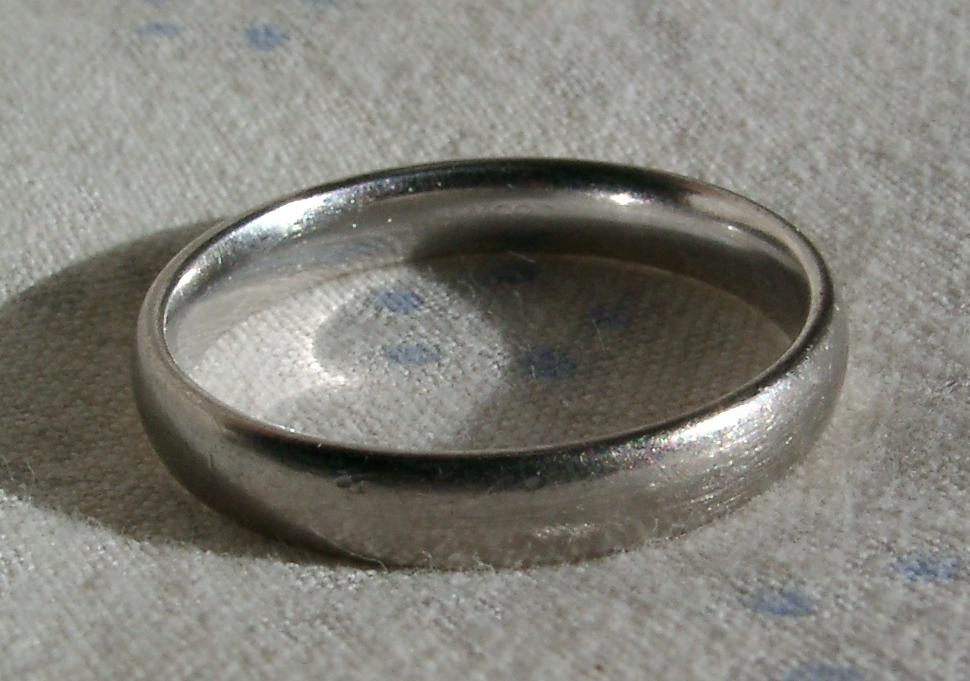
Rhodium-plated white gold wedding ring

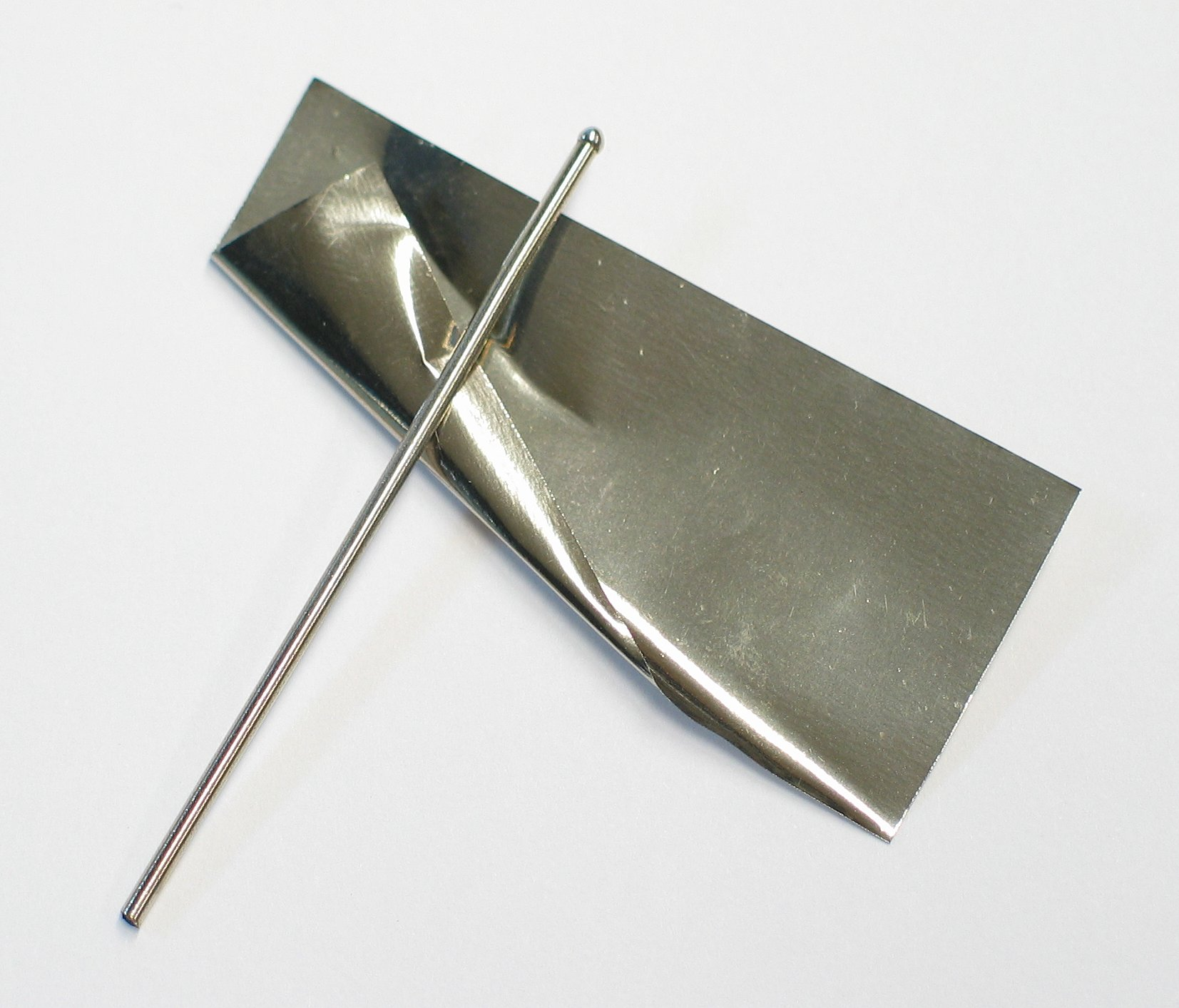
Rhodium foil and wire

== Precautions ==
Rhodium
Hazards
- GHS labelling
Hazard statements	H413
Precautionary statements	P273, P501
NFPA 704 (fire diamond)	0 0 0

Being a noble metal, pure rhodium is inert and harmless in elemental form. However, chemical complexes of rhodium can be reactive. For rhodium chloride, the median lethal dose (LD_{50}) for rats is 198 mg (RhCl_{3}) per kilogram of body weight.

People can be exposed to rhodium in the workplace by inhalation. The Occupational Safety and Health Administration (OSHA) has specified the legal limit (Permissible exposure limit) for rhodium exposure in the workplace at 0.1 mg/m^{3} over an 8-hour workday, and the National Institute for Occupational Safety and Health (NIOSH) has set the recommended exposure limit (REL), at the same level. At levels of 100 mg/m^{3}, rhodium is immediately dangerous to life or health. For soluble compounds, the PEL and REL are both 0.001 mg/m^{3}.

== See also ==
- 2000s commodities boom
- 2020s commodities boom
- Bullion
- Bullion coin
- Rhodium compounds
