= Isotopes of rhodium =

Isotopes of rhodium (_{45}Rh)
Main isotopes			Decay	
Isotope	abundance	half-life (t_{1/2})	mode	product
^{99}Rh	synth	16.1 d	β^{+}	^{99}Ru
^{100}Rh	synth	20.8 h	β^{+}	^{100}Ru
^{101}Rh	synth	4.07 y	ε	^{101}Ru
^{101m}Rh	synth	4.343 d	ε	^{101}Ru
^{101m}Rh	synth	4.343 d	IT	^{101}Rh
^{102}Rh	synth	207 d	β^{+}	^{102}Ru
^{102}Rh	synth	207 d	β^{−}	^{102}Pd
^{102m}Rh	synth	3.742 y	β^{+}	^{102}Ru
^{102m}Rh	synth	3.742 y	IT	^{102}Rh
^{103}Rh	100%	stable		
^{105}Rh	synth	35.34 h	β^{−}	^{105}Pd

Standard atomic weight A_{r}°(Rh)
- 102.90549±0.00002; 102.91±0.01 (abridged)

Naturally occurring rhodium (_{45}Rh) is composed of only one stable isotope, ^{103}Rh. The most stable radioisotopes are ^{101}Rh with a half-life of 4.07 years, ^{102}Rh with a half-life of 207 days, and ^{99}Rh with a half-life of 16.1 days. Thirty other radioisotopes have been characterized ranging from ^{89}Rh to ^{122}Rh - these have half-lives that are less than an hour except ^{100}Rh (20.8 hours) and ^{105}Rh (35.34 hours). There are also numerous meta states with the most stable being ^{102m}Rh with a half-life of 3.74 years and ^{101m}Rh with a half-life of 4.34 days.

The primary decay mode before the only stable isotope, ^{103}Rh, is electron capture to ruthenium isotopes, and the primary mode after is beta emission to palladium isotopes. Mass numbers 102 and 104 are capable of decay in either sense.

== List of isotopes ==
Nuclide (Note: ^{m}Rh – Excited nuclear isomer.)	Z	N	Isotopic mass (Da) (Note: ( ) – Uncertainty (1σ) is given in concise form in parentheses after the corresponding last digits.) (Note: # – Atomic mass marked #: value and uncertainty derived not from purely experimental data, but at least partly from trends from the Mass Surface (TMS).)	Discovery year	Half-life (Note: # – Values marked # are not purely derived from experimental data, but at least partly from trends of neighboring nuclides (TNN).)	Decay mode (Note: Modes of decay: EC: / Electron capture; IT: / Isomeric transition; n: / Neutron emission; p: / Proton emission)	Daughter isotope (Note: Bold symbol as daughter – Daughter product is stable.)	Spin and parity (Note: ( ) spin value – Indicates spin with weak assignment arguments.)	Isotopic abundance
Nuclide	Excitation energy			Discovery year	Half-life	Decay mode	Daughter isotope	Spin and parity	Isotopic abundance
^{89}Rh	45	44	88.95099(39)#	(1995)	<120 ns	β^{+}?	^{89}Ru	9/2+#	
^{89}Rh	45	44	88.95099(39)#	(1995)	<120 ns	p?	^{88}Ru	9/2+#	
^{89}Rh	45	44	88.95099(39)#	(1995)	<120 ns	β^{+}, p?	^{88}Tc	9/2+#	
^{90}Rh	45	45	89.94457(22)#	1994	29(3) ms	β^{+}	^{90}Ru	(0+)	
^{90}Rh	45	45	89.94457(22)#	1994	29(3) ms	β^{+}, p? (<0.7%)	^{89}Tc	(0+)	
^{90m}Rh (Note: Order of ground state and isomer is uncertain.)	0(500)# keV			2001	0.56(2) s	β^{+} (90.4%)	^{90}Ru	(7+)	
^{90m}Rh	0(500)# keV			2001	0.56(2) s	β^{+}, p (9.6%)	^{89}Tc	(7+)	
^{91}Rh	45	46	90.93712(32)#	1994	1.47(22) s	β^{+} (98.7%)	^{91}Ru	(9/2+)	
^{91}Rh	45	46	90.93712(32)#	1994	1.47(22) s	β^{+}, p (1.3%)	^{90}Tc	(9/2+)	
^{91m}Rh	172.9(4) keV			2005	1.8# s	β^{+}?	^{91}Ru	1/2−#	
^{91m}Rh	172.9(4) keV			2005	1.8# s	β^{+}, p?	^{90}Tc	1/2−#	
^{91m}Rh	172.9(4) keV			2005	1.8# s	IT?	^{91}Rh	1/2−#	
^{92}Rh	45	47	91.9323677(47)	1994	5.61(8) s	β^{+} (97.95%)	^{92}Ru	(6+)	
^{92}Rh	45	47	91.9323677(47)	1994	5.61(8) s	β^{+}, p (2.05%)	^{91}Tc	(6+)	
^{92m1}Rh	50(100)# keV			2004	3.18(22) s	β^{+} (98.3%)	^{92}Ru	(2+)	
^{92m1}Rh	50(100)# keV			2004	3.18(22) s	β^{+}, p (1.7%)	^{91}Tc	(2+)	
^{92m2}Rh	105(100)# keV			2017	232(15) ns	IT	^{92}Rh	(4+)	
^{93}Rh	45	48	92.9259128(28)	1994	13.9(16) s	β^{+}	^{93}Ru	9/2+#	
^{93m}Rh	267(48) keV			2023				(1/2−)	
^{94}Rh	45	49	93.9217305(36)	1979	70.6(6) s	β^{+} (98.2%)	^{94}Ru	(4+)	
^{94}Rh	45	49	93.9217305(36)	1979	70.6(6) s	β^{+}, p (1.8%)	^{93}Tc	(4+)	
^{94m1}Rh	54.60(20)# keV			2006	480(30) ns	IT	^{94}Rh	(2+)	
^{94m2}Rh	300(200)# keV			1980	25.8(2) s	β^{+}	^{94}Ru	(8+)	
^{95}Rh	45	50	94.9158979(42)	1967	5.02(10) min	β^{+}	^{95}Ru	(9/2)+	
^{95m}Rh	543.3(3) keV			1975	1.96(4) min	IT (88%)	^{95}Rh	(1/2)−	
^{95m}Rh	543.3(3) keV			1975	1.96(4) min	β^{+} (12%)	^{95}Ru	(1/2)−	
^{96}Rh	45	51	95.914452(11)	1967	9.90(10) min	β^{+}	^{96}Ru	6+	
^{96m}Rh	51.98(9) keV			1967	1.51(2) min	IT (60%)	^{96}Rh	3+	
^{96m}Rh	51.98(9) keV			1967	1.51(2) min	β^{+} (40%)	^{96}Ru	3+	
^{97}Rh	45	52	96.911328(38)	1955	30.7(6) min	β^{+}	^{97}Ru	9/2+	
^{97m}Rh	258.76(18) keV			1971	46.2(16) min	β^{+} (94.4%)	^{97}Ru	1/2−	
^{97m}Rh	258.76(18) keV			1971	46.2(16) min	IT (5.6%)	^{97}Rh	1/2−	
^{98}Rh	45	53	97.910708(13)	1955	8.72(12) min	β^{+}	^{98}Ru	(2)+	
^{98m}Rh	56.3(10) keV			1966	3.6(2) min	IT (89%)	^{98}Rh	(5+)	
^{98m}Rh	56.3(10) keV			1966	3.6(2) min	β^{+} (11%)	^{98}Ru	(5+)	
^{99}Rh	45	54	98.908121(21)	1952	16.1(2) d	β^{+}	^{99}Ru	1/2−	
^{99m}Rh	64.4(5) keV			1965	4.7(1) h	β^{+}	^{99}Ru	9/2+	
^{99m}Rh	64.4(5) keV			1965	4.7(1) h	IT?	^{99}Rh	9/2+	
^{100}Rh	45	55	99.908114(19)	1948	20.8(1) h	EC (95.1%)	^{100}Ru	1−	
^{100}Rh	45	55	99.908114(19)	1948	20.8(1) h	β^{+} (4.9%)	^{100}Ru	1−	
^{100m1}Rh	74.782(14) keV			1965	214.0(20) ns	IT	^{100}Rh	(2)+	
^{100m2}Rh	107.6(2) keV			1974	4.6(2) min	IT (98.3%)	^{100}Rh	(5+)	
^{100m2}Rh	107.6(2) keV			1974	4.6(2) min	β^{+} (1.7%)	^{100}Ru	(5+)	
^{100m3}Rh	219.61(22) keV			1984	130(10) ns	IT	^{100}Rh	(7+)	
^{101}Rh	45	56	100.9061589(63)	1948	4.07(5) y	EC	^{101}Ru	1/2−	
^{101m}Rh	157.32(3) keV			1965	4.343(10) d	EC (92.80%)	^{101}Ru	9/2+	
^{101m}Rh	157.32(3) keV			1965	4.343(10) d	IT (7.20%)	^{101}Rh	9/2+	
^{102}Rh	45	57	101.9068343(69)	1941	207.0(15) d	β^{+} (78%)	^{102}Ru	2−	
^{102}Rh	45	57	101.9068343(69)	1941	207.0(15) d	β^{−} (22%)	^{102}Pd	2−	
^{102m}Rh	140.73(9) keV			1963	3.742(10) y	β^{+} (99.77%)	^{102}Ru	6+	
^{102m}Rh	140.73(9) keV			1963	3.742(10) y	IT (0.233%)	^{102}Rh	6+	
^{103}Rh (Note: Fission product)	45	58	102.9054941(25)	1934	Stable			1/2−	1.0000
^{103m}Rh	39.753(6) keV			1944	56.114(9) min	IT	^{103}Rh	7/2+	
^{104}Rh	45	59	103.9066453(25)	1939	42.3(4) s	β^{−} (99.55%)	^{104}Pd	1+	
^{104}Rh	45	59	103.9066453(25)	1939	42.3(4) s	β^{+} (0.45%)	^{104}Ru	1+	
^{104m}Rh	128.9679(5) keV			1939	4.34(3) min	IT (99.87%)	^{104}Rh	5+	
^{104m}Rh	128.9679(5) keV			1939	4.34(3) min	β^{−} (0.13%)	^{104}Pd	5+	
^{105}Rh	45	60	104.9056878(27)	1946	35.341(19) h	β^{−}	^{105}Pd	7/2+	
^{105m}Rh	129.742(4) keV			1951	42.8(3) s	IT	^{105}Rh	1/2−	
^{106}Rh	45	61	105.9072859(58)	1946	30.07(35) s	β^{−}	^{106}Pd	1+	
^{106m}Rh	132(11) keV			1955	131(2) min	β^{−}	^{106}Pd	(6)+	
^{107}Rh	45	62	106.906748(13)	1951	21.7(4) min	β^{−}	^{107}Pd	7/2+	
^{107m}Rh	268.36(4) keV			1986	>10 μs	IT	^{107}Rh	1/2−	
^{108}Rh	45	63	107.908715(15)	1955	16.8(5) s	β^{−}	^{108}Pd	1+	
^{108m}Rh	115(18) keV			1969	6.0(3) min	β^{−}	^{108}Pd	(5+)	
^{109}Rh	45	64	108.9087496(43)	1972	80.8(7) s	β^{−}	^{109}Pd	7/2+	
^{109m}Rh	225.873(19) keV			1987	1.66(4) μs	IT	^{109}Rh	3/2+	
^{110}Rh	45	65	109.911080(19)	1963	3.35(12) s	β^{−}	^{110}Pd	(1+)	
^{110m}Rh	220(150)# keV			1970	28.5(13) s	β^{−}	^{110}Pd	(6+)	
^{111}Rh	45	66	110.9116432(74)	1975	11(1) s	β^{−}	^{111}Pd	(7/2+)	
^{112}Rh	45	67	111.914405(47)	1971	3.4(4) s	β^{−}	^{112}Pd	(1+)	
^{112m}Rh	340(70) keV			1988	6.73(15) s	β^{−}	^{112}Pd	(6+)	
^{113}Rh	45	68	112.9154402(77)	1971	2.80(12) s	β^{−}	^{113}Pd	(7/2+)	
^{114}Rh	45	69	113.918722(77)	1988	1.85(5) s	β^{−}	^{114}Pd	1+	
^{114m}Rh	200(150)# keV			1988	1.85(5) s	β^{−}	^{114}Pd	(7−)	
^{114m2}Rh	94.5(23) keV			2025	~1 s	β^{−}	^{114}Pd	(0−)	
^{115}Rh	45	70	114.9203116(79)	1988	1.03(3) s	β^{−}	^{115}Pd	(7/2+)	
^{115}Rh	45	70	114.9203116(79)	1988	1.03(3) s	β^{−}, n?	^{114}Pd	(7/2+)	
^{116}Rh	45	71	115.924062(79)	1970	685(39) ms	β^{−} (>97.9%)	^{116}Pd	1+	
^{116}Rh	45	71	115.924062(79)	1970	685(39) ms	β^{−}, n? (<2.1%)	^{115}Pd	1+	
^{116m}Rh	200(150)# keV			1988	570(50) ms	β^{−} (>97.9%)	^{116}Pd	(6−)	
^{116m}Rh	200(150)# keV			1988	570(50) ms	β^{−}, n? (<2.1%)	^{115}Pd	(6−)	
^{117}Rh	45	72	116.9260363(95)	1991	421(30) ms	β^{−}	^{117}Pd	7/2+#	
^{117}Rh	45	72	116.9260363(95)	1991	421(30) ms	β^{−}, n? (<7.6%)	^{116}Pd	7/2+#	
^{117m}Rh	321.2(10) keV			2013	138(17) ns	IT	^{117}Rh	3/2+#	
^{118}Rh	45	73	117.930341(26)	1994	282(9) ms	β^{−} (96.9%)	^{118}Pd	1+#	
^{118}Rh	45	73	117.930341(26)	1994	282(9) ms	β^{−}, n (3.1%)	^{117}Pd	1+#	
^{118m}Rh	200(150)# keV			2023	310(30) ms	β^{−} (96.9%)	^{118}Pd	6−#	
^{118m}Rh	200(150)# keV			2023	310(30) ms	β^{−}, n (3.1%)	^{117}Pd	6−#	
^{118m}Rh	200(150)# keV			2023	310(30) ms	IT?	^{118}Rh	6−#	
^{119}Rh	45	74	118.932557(10)	1994	190(6) ms	β^{−} (93.6%)	^{119}Pd	7/2+#	
^{119}Rh	45	74	118.932557(10)	1994	190(6) ms	β^{−}, n (6.4%)	^{118}Pd	7/2+#	
^{119m}Rh	260.7(10) keV			2026	107(10) ms	β^{−}	^{119}Pd	1/2−#	
^{119m}Rh	260.7(10) keV			2026	107(10) ms	β^{−}, n?	^{118}Pd	1/2−#	
^{119m}Rh	260.7(10) keV			2026	107(10) ms	IT?	^{119}Rh	1/2−#	
^{120}Rh	45	75	119.93707(22)#	1994	129.6(42) ms	β^{−}	^{120}Pd	8−#	
^{120}Rh	45	75	119.93707(22)#	1994	129.6(42) ms	β^{−}, n (<9.3%)	^{119}Pd	8−#	
^{120}Rh	45	75	119.93707(22)#	1994	129.6(42) ms	β^{−}, 2n?	^{118}Pd	8−#	
^{120m}Rh	157.2(7) keV			2012	295(16) ns	IT	^{120}Rh	6#	
^{121}Rh	45	76	120.93961(67)	1994	74(4) ms	β^{−}	^{121}Pd	7/2+#	
^{121}Rh	45	76	120.93961(67)	1994	74(4) ms	β^{−}, n (>11%)	^{120}Pd	7/2+#	
^{122}Rh	45	77	121.94431(32)#	1997	51(6) ms	β^{−}	^{122}Pd	7−#	
^{122}Rh	45	77	121.94431(32)#	1997	51(6) ms	β^{−}, n (<3.9%)	^{121}Pd	7−#	
^{122}Rh	45	77	121.94431(32)#	1997	51(6) ms	β^{−}, 2n?	^{120}Pd	7−#	
^{122m}Rh	271.0(7) keV			2012	830(120) ns	IT	^{122}Rh	4+#	
^{123}Rh	45	78	122.94719(43)#	2010	42(4) ms	β^{−}	^{123}Pd	7/2+#	
^{123}Rh	45	78	122.94719(43)#	2010	42(4) ms	β^{−}, n (>24%)	^{122}Pd	7/2+#	
^{123}Rh	45	78	122.94719(43)#	2010	42(4) ms	β^{−}, 2n?	^{121}Pd	7/2+#	
^{124}Rh	45	79	123.95200(43)#	2010	30(2) ms	β^{−}	^{124}Pd	2+#	
^{124}Rh	45	79	123.95200(43)#	2010	30(2) ms	β^{−}, n (<31%)	^{123}Pd	2+#	
^{124}Rh	45	79	123.95200(43)#	2010	30(2) ms	β^{−}, 2n?	^{122}Pd	2+#	
^{125}Rh	45	80	124.95509(54)#	2010	26.5(20) ms	β^{−}	^{125}Pd	7/2+#	
^{125}Rh	45	80	124.95509(54)#	2010	26.5(20) ms	β^{−}, n?	^{124}Pd	7/2+#	
^{125}Rh	45	80	124.95509(54)#	2010	26.5(20) ms	β^{−}, 2n?	^{123}Pd	7/2+#	
^{126}Rh	45	81	125.96006(54)#	2010	19(3) ms	β^{−}	^{126}Pd	1−#	
^{126}Rh	45	81	125.96006(54)#	2010	19(3) ms	β^{−}, n?	^{125}Pd	1−#	
^{126}Rh	45	81	125.96006(54)#	2010	19(3) ms	β^{−}, 2n?	^{124}Pd	1−#	
^{127}Rh	45	82	126.96379(64)#	2015	28(14) ms	β^{−}	^{127}Pd	7/2+#	
^{127}Rh	45	82	126.96379(64)#	2015	28(14) ms	β^{−}, n?	^{126}Pd	7/2+#	
^{127}Rh	45	82	126.96379(64)#	2015	28(14) ms	β^{−}, 2n?	^{125}Pd	7/2+#	
^{128}Rh	45	83	127.97065(32)#	2018	8# ms [> 550 ns]	β^{−}?	^{128}Pd		
^{128}Rh	45	83	127.97065(32)#	2018	8# ms [> 550 ns]	β^{−}, n?	^{127}Pd		
^{128}Rh	45	83	127.97065(32)#	2018	8# ms [> 550 ns]	β^{−}, 2n?	^{126}Pd		
This table header & footer:

== See also ==
Daughter products other than rhodium

- Isotopes of palladium
- Isotopes of ruthenium
- Isotopes of technetium
