= Isotopes of ruthenium =

Isotopes of ruthenium (_{44}Ru)
| Main isotopes | | | Decay | |
| Isotope | abundance | half-life (t_{1/2}) | mode | product |
|---|---|---|---|---|
| ^{96}Ru | 5.54% | stable | | |
| ^{97}Ru | synth | 2.837 d | ε | ^{97}Tc |
| ^{98}Ru | 1.87% | stable | | |
| ^{99}Ru | 12.76% | stable | | |
| ^{100}Ru | 12.60% | stable | | |
| ^{101}Ru | 17.06% | stable | | |
| ^{102}Ru | 31.55% | stable | | |
| ^{103}Ru | synth | 39.245 d | β^{−} | ^{103}Rh |
| ^{104}Ru | 18.62% | stable | | |
| ^{106}Ru | synth | 371.8 d | β^{−} | ^{106}Rh |

Standard atomic weight A_{r}°(Ru)
- 101.07±0.02; 101.07±0.02 (abridged)

Naturally occurring ruthenium (_{44}Ru) is composed of seven stable isotopes: 96, 98-102, 104 (of which the first and last may in the future be found radioactive). Additionally, 27 synthetic radioactive isotopes have been discovered. Of these radioisotopes, the most stable are ^{106}Ru with a half-life of 371.8 days or 1.018 years, ^{103}Ru, with a half-life of 39.245 days, and ^{97}Ru with a half-life of 2.837 days.

The other known isotopes run from ^{87}Ru to ^{120}Ru, and most of these have half-lives that are less than five minutes, except ^{94}Ru (51.8 minutes), ^{95}Ru (1.607 hours), and ^{105}Ru (4.44 hours).

The primary decay mode before the most abundant isotope, ^{102}Ru, is electron capture to isotopes of technetium, and after beta emission to isotopes of rhodium. Double beta decay is the allowed mode for the two observationally stable isotopes: ^{96}Ru and ^{104}Ru.

Because of the volatility of ruthenium tetroxide (RuO_{4}), ruthenium isotopes with relatively short half-life are considered the next most hazardous airborne isotopes, after iodine-131, in case of release by a nuclear accident. The two most important isotopes of ruthenium so released are those with the longest half-life: ^{103}Ru ^{106}Ru.

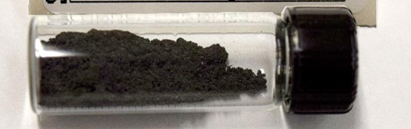
Ruthenium-96

== List of isotopes ==
| Nuclide (Note: ^{m}Ru – Excited nuclear isomer.) | Z | N | Isotopic mass (Da) (Note: ( ) – Uncertainty (1σ) is given in concise form in parentheses after the corresponding last digits.) (Note: # – Atomic mass marked #: value and uncertainty derived not from purely experimental data, but at least partly from trends from the Mass Surface (TMS).) | Discovery year | Half-life (Note: # – Values marked # are not purely derived from experimental data, but at least partly from trends of neighboring nuclides (TNN).) | Decay mode (Note: Modes of decay: IT: / Isomeric transition; n: / Neutron emission; p: / Proton emission) | Daughter isotope (Note: Bold symbol as daughter – Daughter product is stable.) | Spin and parity (Note: ( ) spin value – Indicates spin with weak assignment arguments.) | Natural abundance (mole fraction) | |
| Nuclide | Excitation energy | | | Discovery year | Half-life | Decay mode | Daughter isotope | Spin and parity | Normal proportion | Range of variation |
|---|---|---|---|---|---|---|---|---|---|---|
| ^{85}Ru | 44 | 41 | 84.96712(54)# | 2017 | 1# ms [> 400 ns] | | | 3/2−# | | |
| ^{86}Ru | 44 | 42 | 85.95731(43)# | 2017 | 50# ms [> 400 ns] | | | 0+ | | |
| ^{87}Ru | 44 | 43 | 86.95091(43)# | 1995 | 50# ms [> 1.5 μs] | | | 1/2−# | | |
| ^{88}Ru | 44 | 44 | 87.941760(20) | 1994 | 1.5(3) s | β^{+} (>96.4%) | ^{88}Tc | 0+ | | |
| ^{88}Ru | 44 | 44 | 87.941760(20) | 1994 | 1.5(3) s | β^{+}, p (<3.6%) | ^{87}Mo | 0+ | | |
| ^{89}Ru | 44 | 45 | 88.937338(26) | 1992 | 1.32(3) s | β^{+} (96.7%) | ^{89}Tc | (9/2+) | | |
| ^{89}Ru | 44 | 45 | 88.937338(26) | 1992 | 1.32(3) s | β^{+}, p (3.1%) | ^{88}Mo | (9/2+) | | |
| ^{90}Ru | 44 | 46 | 89.9303444(40) | 1991 | 11.7(9) s | β^{+} | ^{90}Tc | 0+ | | |
| ^{91}Ru | 44 | 47 | 90.9267415(24) | 1983 | 8.0(4) s | β^{+} | ^{91}Tc | (9/2+) | | |
| ^{91m}Ru | 432(31) keV | | | 1983 | 7.6(8) s | β^{+} (>99.9%) | ^{91}Tc | (1/2−) | | |
| ^{91m}Ru | 432(31) keV | | | 1983 | 7.6(8) s | β^{+}, p (?%) | ^{90}Mo | (1/2−) | | |
| ^{92}Ru | 44 | 48 | 91.9202344(29) | 1971 | 3.65(5) min | β^{+} | ^{92}Tc | 0+ | | |
| ^{92m}Ru | 2833.9(18) keV | | | 1980 | 100(8) ns | IT | ^{92}Ru | (8+) | | |
| ^{93}Ru | 44 | 49 | 92.9171044(22) | 1972 | 59.7(6) s | β^{+} | ^{93}Tc | (9/2)+ | | |
| ^{93m1}Ru | 734.40(10) keV | | | 1976 | 10.8(3) s | β^{+} (78.0%) | ^{93}Tc | (1/2)− | | |
| ^{93m1}Ru | 734.40(10) keV | | | 1976 | 10.8(3) s | IT (22.0%) | ^{93}Ru | (1/2)− | | |
| ^{93m1}Ru | 734.40(10) keV | | | 1976 | 10.8(3) s | β^{+}, p (0.027%) | ^{92}Mo | (1/2)− | | |
| ^{93m2}Ru | 2082.5(9) keV | | | 1983 | 2.30(7) μs | IT | ^{93}Ru | (21/2)+ | | |
| ^{94}Ru | 44 | 50 | 93.9113429(34) | 1952 | 51.8(6) min | β^{+} | ^{94}Tc | 0+ | | |
| ^{94m}Ru | 2644.1(4) keV | | | 1969 | 67.5(28) μs | IT | ^{94}Ru | 8+ | | |
| ^{95}Ru | 44 | 51 | 94.910404(10) | 1948 | 1.607(4) h | β^{+} | ^{95}Tc | 5/2+ | | |
| ^{96}Ru | 44 | 52 | 95.90758891(18) | 1931 | Observationally Stable (Note: Believed to undergo β^{+}β^{+} decay to ^{96}Mo with a half-life over 8×10^{19} years) | | | 0+ | 0.0554(14) | |
| ^{97}Ru | 44 | 53 | 96.9075458(30) | 1946 | 2.8370(14) d | β^{+} | ^{97}Tc | 5/2+ | | |
| ^{98}Ru | 44 | 54 | 97.9052867(69) | 1944 | Stable | | | 0+ | 0.0187(3) | |
| ^{99}Ru | 44 | 55 | 98.90593028(37) | 1931 | Stable | | | 5/2+ | 0.1276(14) | |
| ^{100}Ru | 44 | 56 | 99.90421046(37) | 1931 | Stable | | | 0+ | 0.1260(7) | |
| ^{101}Ru (Note: Fission product) | 44 | 57 | 100.90557309(44) | 1931 | Stable | | | 5/2+ | 0.1706(2) | |
| ^{101m}Ru | 527.56(10) keV | | | 1964 | 17.5(4) μs | IT | ^{101}Ru | 11/2− | | |
| ^{102}Ru | 44 | 58 | 101.90434031(45) | 1931 | Stable | | | 0+ | 0.3155(14) | |
| ^{103}Ru | 44 | 59 | 102.90631485(47) | 1946 | 39.245(8) d | β^{−} | ^{103}Rh | 3/2+ | | |
| ^{103m}Ru | 238.2(7) keV | | | 1964 | 1.69(7) ms | IT | ^{103}Ru | 11/2− | | |
| ^{104}Ru | 44 | 60 | 103.9054253(27) | 1931 | Observationally Stable (Note: Believed to undergo β^{−}β^{−} decay to ^{104}Pd) | | | 0+ | 0.1862(27) | |
| ^{105}Ru | 44 | 61 | 104.9077455(27) | 1946 | 4.439(11) h | β^{−} | ^{105}Rh | 3/2+ | | |
| ^{105m}Ru | 20.606(14) keV | | | 1974 | 340(15) ns | IT | ^{105}Ru | 5/2+ | | |
| ^{106}Ru | 44 | 62 | 105.9073282(58) | 1946 | 371.8(18) d | β^{−} | ^{106}Rh | 0+ | | |
| ^{107}Ru | 44 | 63 | 106.9099698(93) | 1951 | 3.75(5) min | β^{−} | ^{107}Rh | (5/2)+ | | |
| ^{108}Ru | 44 | 64 | 107.9101858(93) | 1955 | 4.55(5) min | β^{−} | ^{108}Rh | 0+ | | |
| ^{109}Ru | 44 | 65 | 108.9133237(96) | 1967 | 34.4(2) s | β^{−} | ^{109}Rh | (5/2+) | | |
| ^{109m}Ru | 96.14(15) keV | | | 1999 | 680(30) ns | IT | ^{109}Ru | (5/2−) | | |
| ^{110}Ru | 44 | 66 | 109.9140385(96) | 1970 | 12.04(17) s | β^{−} | ^{110}Rh | 0+ | | |
| ^{111}Ru | 44 | 67 | 110.917568(10) | 1970 | 2.12(7) s | β^{−} | ^{111}Rh | 5/2+ | | |
| ^{112}Ru | 44 | 68 | 111.918807(10) | 1970 | 1.75(7) s | β^{−} | ^{112}Rh | 0+ | | |
| ^{113}Ru | 44 | 69 | 112.922847(41) | 1988 | 0.80(5) s | β^{−} | ^{113}Rh | (1/2+) | | |
| ^{113m}Ru | 131(33) keV | | | 1998 | 510(30) ms | β^{−} (?%) | ^{113}Rh | (7/2−) | | |
| ^{113m}Ru | 131(33) keV | | | 1998 | 510(30) ms | IT (?%) | ^{113}Ru | (7/2−) | | |
| ^{114}Ru | 44 | 70 | 113.9246144(38) | 1991 | 0.54(3) s | β^{−} | ^{114}Rh | 0+ | | |
| ^{114}Ru | 44 | 70 | 113.9246144(38) | 1991 | 0.54(3) s | β^{-}, n? | ^{113}Rh | 0+ | | |
| ^{114}Ru | 44 | 70 | 113.9246144(38) | 1991 | 0.54(3) s | β^{-}, 2n? | ^{112}Rh | 0+ | | |
| ^{115}Ru | 44 | 71 | 114.929033(27) | 1992 | 318(19) ms | β^{−} | ^{115}Rh | (1/2+) | | |
| ^{115}Ru | 44 | 71 | 114.929033(27) | 1992 | 318(19) ms | β^{-}, n? | ^{114}Rh | (1/2+) | | |
| ^{115m}Ru | 82(6) keV | | | 2010 | 76(6) ms | β^{−} (?%) | ^{115}Rh | (7/2−) | | |
| ^{115m}Ru | 82(6) keV | | | 2010 | 76(6) ms | IT (?%) | ^{115}Ru | (7/2−) | | |
| ^{116}Ru | 44 | 72 | 115.9312192(40) | 1994 | 204(6) ms | β^{−} | ^{116}Rh | 0+ | | |
| ^{116}Ru | 44 | 72 | 115.9312192(40) | 1994 | 204(6) ms | β^{-}, n? | ^{115}Rh | 0+ | | |
| ^{117}Ru | 44 | 73 | 116.93614(47) | 1994 | 151(3) ms | β^{−} | ^{117}Rh | 3/2+# | | |
| ^{117}Ru | 44 | 73 | 116.93614(47) | 1994 | 151(3) ms | β^{-}, n? | ^{116}Rh | 3/2+# | | |
| ^{117m}Ru | 185.0(4) keV | | | 2012 | 2.49(6) μs | IT | ^{117}Ru | 7/2−# | | |
| ^{118}Ru | 44 | 74 | 117.93881(22)# | 1994 | 99(3) ms | β^{−} | ^{118}Rh | 0+ | | |
| ^{118}Ru | 44 | 74 | 117.93881(22)# | 1994 | 99(3) ms | β^{-}, n? | ^{117}Rh | 0+ | | |
| ^{119}Ru | 44 | 75 | 118.94409(32)# | 1997 | 69.5(20) ms | β^{−} | ^{119}Rh | 3/2+# | | |
| ^{119}Ru | 44 | 75 | 118.94409(32)# | 1997 | 69.5(20) ms | β^{-}, n? | ^{118}Rh | 3/2+# | | |
| ^{119}Ru | 44 | 75 | 118.94409(32)# | 1997 | 69.5(20) ms | β^{-}, 2n? | ^{117}Rh | 3/2+# | | |
| ^{119m}Ru | 227.1(7) keV | | | 2012 | 384(22) ns | IT | ^{119}Ru | | | |
| ^{120}Ru | 44 | 76 | 119.94662(43)# | 2010 | 45(2) ms | β^{−} | ^{120}Rh | 0+ | | |
| ^{121}Ru | 44 | 77 | 120.95210(43)# | 2010 | 29(2) ms | β^{−} | ^{121}Rh | 3/2+# | | |
| ^{122}Ru | 44 | 78 | 121.95515(54)# | 2010 | 25(1) ms | β^{−} | ^{122}Rh | 0+ | | |
| ^{123}Ru | 44 | 79 | 122.96076(54)# | 2010 | 19(2) ms | β^{−} | ^{123}Rh | 3/2+# | | |
| ^{124}Ru | 44 | 80 | 123.96394(64)# | 2010 | 15(3) ms | β^{−} | ^{124}Rh | 0+ | | |
| ^{125}Ru | 44 | 81 | 124.96954(32)# | 2018 | 12# ms [> 550 ns] | | | 3/2+# | | |
This table header & footer:

== Alleged ruthenium-106 leak ==
In September 2017 an estimated amount of 100 to 300 TBq (0.3 to 1 g) of ^{106}Ru was released in Russia, probably in the Ural region. It was, after ruling out release from a reentering satellite, concluded that the source was either in nuclear fuel cycle facilities or radioactive source production. In France levels up to 0.036mBq/m^{3} of air were measured. It was estimated that for distances of the order of a few tens of kilometres, contamination levels may have exceeded the limits for non-dairy foodstuffs.

== Asteroid that ended the Cretaceous period ==
The ratios of the amounts of ruthenium isotopes were used to determine the age of the asteroid which exterminated the dinosaurs at the end of the Cretaceous period, and to show that it originated beyond Jupiter in the outer solar system.

== See also ==
Daughter products other than ruthenium

- Isotopes of rhodium
- Isotopes of technetium
- Isotopes of molybdenum
