= Isotopes of technetium =

Isotopes of technetium (_{43}Tc)
Main isotopes			Decay	
Isotope	abundance	half-life (t_{1/2})	mode	product
^{95m}Tc	synth	62.0 d	β^{+}	^{95}Mo
^{95m}Tc	synth	62.0 d	IT	^{95}Tc
^{96}Tc	synth	4.28 d	β^{+}	^{96}Mo
^{97}Tc	synth	4.21×10^{6} y	ε	^{97}Mo
^{97m}Tc	synth	91.1 d	IT	^{97}Tc
^{97m}Tc	synth	91.1 d	ε	^{97}Mo
^{98}Tc	synth	4.2×10^{6} y	β^{−}	^{98}Ru
^{98}Tc	synth	4.2×10^{6} y	ε	^{98}Mo
^{99}Tc	trace	2.111×10^{5} y	β^{−}	^{99}Ru
^{99m}Tc	synth	6.01 h	IT	^{99}Tc
^{99m}Tc	synth	6.01 h	β^{−}	^{99}Ru

Technetium (_{43}Tc) is one of the two elements with Z < 83 that have no stable isotopes; the other such element is promethium. It is primarily artificial, with only trace quantities existing in nature produced by spontaneous fission (there are an estimated 2.5×10^{−13} grams of ^{99}Tc per gram of pitchblende) or neutron capture by molybdenum. The element was first obtained in 1936 from bombarded molybdenum, the first artificial element to be produced. The most stable radioisotopes are ^{97}Tc (half-life of 4.21 million years), ^{98}Tc (half-life: 4.2 million years), and ^{99}Tc (half-life: 211,100 years). Given that their stated uncertainties are 16 and 30 times their difference, the half-lives of ^{97}Tc and ^{98}Tc are statistically indistinguishable.

Thirty-three other radioisotopes have been characterized with atomic masses ranging from ^{85}Tc to ^{120}Tc. Those with half-lives more than an hour have masses 93 to 96.

Technetium also has numerous meta states. ^{97m}Tc is the most stable, with a half-life of 91.1 days (0.097 MeV), followed by ^{95m}Tc (half-life: 62.0 days, 0.039 MeV) and ^{99m}Tc (half-life: 6.01 hours, 0.143 MeV). ^{99m}Tc emits only gamma rays while decaying to ^{99}Tc.

For isotopes lighter than ^{98}Tc, the primary decay mode is electron capture to isotopes of molybdenum. For the heavier isotopes, the primary mode is beta emission to isotopes of ruthenium, with the exception that ^{98}Tc and ^{100}Tc can decay both by beta emission and electron capture.

Technetium-99m is the technetium isotope employed in the nuclear medicine industry. Its low-energy isomeric transition, which yields a gamma-ray at ~140.5 keV, is ideal for imaging using Single Photon Emission Computed Tomography (SPECT). Several technetium isotopes, such as ^{94m}Tc, ^{95}Tc, and ^{96}Tc, which are produced via (p,n) reactions using a cyclotron on molybdenum targets, have also been identified as potential Positron Emission Tomography (PET) or gamma-emitting agents for medical imaging. Technetium-101 has been produced using a D-D fusion-based neutron generator from the ^{100}Mo(n,γ)^{101}Mo reaction on natural molybdenum and subsequent beta-minus decay of ^{101}Mo to ^{101}Tc. Despite its shorter half-life (14.22 minutes), ^{101}Tc exhibits unique decay characteristics suitable for radioisotope diagnostic or therapeutic procedures, where it has been proposed that its implementation, as a supplement for dual-isotopic imaging or replacement for ^{99m}Tc, could be performed by on-site production and dispensing at the point of patient care.

Technetium-99 is the most common and most readily available isotope, as it is a major fission product from fission of actinides like uranium and plutonium with a fission product yield of 6% or more, and in fact the most significant long-lived fission product. Lighter isotopes of technetium are almost never produced in fission because the initial fission products normally have a higher neutron/proton ratio than is stable for their mass range, and therefore undergo beta decay until reaching the ultimate product. Beta decay of fission products of mass 98 and lower, or 100, stops at stable (or very long-lived) isotopes of lower atomic number and does not reach technetium. For greater masses, the technetium isotopes are very short-lived and quickly undergo further beta decay. Therefore, the technetium in spent nuclear fuel is practically all ^{99}Tc. In the presence of fast neutrons a small amount of ^{98}Tc will be produced by (n,2n) "knockout" reactions. If nuclear transmutation of fission-derived technetium, or technetium wastes from medical applications, is desired, fast neutrons are therefore not desirable as the long lived ^{98}Tc increases rather than reducing the longevity of the radioactivity in the material.

One gram of ^{99}Tc produces 6.2×10^{8} disintegrations a second (that is, 0.62 GBq/g).

Technetium has no primordial isotopes and does not occur in nature in significant quantities, and thus a standard atomic weight cannot be given.

== List of isotopes ==
Nuclide (Note: ^{m}Tc – Excited nuclear isomer.)	Z	N	Isotopic mass (Da) (Note: ( ) – Uncertainty (1σ) is given in concise form in parentheses after the corresponding last digits.) (Note: # – Atomic mass marked #: value and uncertainty derived not from purely experimental data, but at least partly from trends from the Mass Surface (TMS).)	Discovery year	Half-life	Decay mode (Note: Modes of decay: EC: / Electron capture; IT: / Isomeric transition; n: / Neutron emission; p: / Proton emission)	Daughter isotope (Note: Bold italics symbol as daughter – Daughter product is nearly stable.) (Note: Bold symbol as daughter – Daughter product is stable.)	Spin and parity (Note: ( ) spin value – Indicates spin with weak assignment arguments.) (Note: # – Values marked # are not purely derived from experimental data, but at least partly from trends of neighboring nuclides (TNN).)	Isotopic abundance
Nuclide	Excitation energy			Discovery year	Half-life	Decay mode	Daughter isotope	Spin and parity	Isotopic abundance
^{86}Tc	43	43	85.94464(32)#	1992	55(7) ms	β^{+}	^{86}Mo	(0+)	
^{86m}Tc	1524(10) keV			2000	1.10(12) μs	IT	^{86}Tc	(6+)	
^{87}Tc	43	44	86.9380672(45)	1991	2.14(17) s	β^{+}	^{87}Mo	9/2+#	
^{87}Tc	43	44	86.9380672(45)	1991	2.14(17) s	β^{+}, p (<0.7%)	^{86}Nb	9/2+#	
^{87m}Tc	71(1) keV			2009	647(24) ns	IT	^{87}Tc	7/2+#	
^{88}Tc	43	45	87.9337942(44)	1991	6.4(8) s	β^{+}	^{88}Mo	(2+)	
^{88m1}Tc	70(3) keV			1996	5.8(2) s	β^{+}	^{88}Mo	(6+)	
^{88m2}Tc	95(1) keV			2009	146(12) ns	IT	^{88}Tc	(4+)	
^{89}Tc	43	46	88.9276486(41)	1991	12.8(9) s	β^{+}	^{89}Mo	(9/2+)	
^{89m}Tc	62.6(5) keV			1991	12.9(8) s	β^{+}	^{89}Mo	(1/2−)	
^{90}Tc	43	47	89.9240739(11)	1974	49.2(4) s	β^{+}	^{90}Mo	(8+)	
^{90m}Tc	144.0(17) keV			1974	8.7(2) s	β^{+}	^{90}Mo	1+	
^{91}Tc	43	48	90.9184250(25)	1974	3.14(2) min	β^{+}	^{91}Mo	(9/2)+	
^{91m}Tc	139.3(3) keV			1976	3.3(1) min	β^{+} (99%)	^{91}Mo	(1/2)−	
^{92}Tc	43	49	91.9152698(33)	1964	4.25(15) min	β^{+}	^{92}Mo	(8)+	
^{92m1}Tc	270.09(8) keV			1976	1.03(6) μs	IT	^{92}Tc	(4+)	
^{92m2}Tc	529.42(13) keV			(1976) (Note: Half-life shorter than 100ns, not included in discovery database)	<0.1 μs	IT	^{92}Tc	(3+)	
^{92m3}Tc	711.33(15) keV			(1976)	<0.1 μs	IT	^{92}Tc	1+	
^{93}Tc	43	50	92.9102451(11)	1948	2.75(5) h	β^{+}	^{93}Mo	9/2+	
^{93m1}Tc	391.84(8) keV			1953	43.5(10) min	IT (77.4%)	^{93}Tc	1/2−	
^{93m1}Tc	391.84(8) keV			1953	43.5(10) min	β^{+} (22.6%)	^{93}Mo	1/2−	
^{93m2}Tc	2185.16(15) keV			1973	10.2(3) μs	IT	^{93}Tc	(17/2)−	
^{94}Tc	43	51	93.9096523(44)	1948	293(1) min	β^{+}	^{94}Mo	7+	
^{94m}Tc	76(3) keV			1962	52(1) min	β^{+} (>99.82%)	^{94}Mo	(2)+	
^{94m}Tc	76(3) keV			1962	52(1) min	IT (<0.18%)	^{94}Tc	(2)+	
^{95}Tc	43	52	94.9076523(55)	1947	19.258(26) h	β^{+}	^{95}Mo	9/2+	
^{95m}Tc	38.91(4) keV			1948	61.96(24) d	β^{+} (96.1%)	^{95}Mo	1/2−	
^{95m}Tc	38.91(4) keV			1948	61.96(24) d	IT (3.9%)	^{95}Tc	1/2−	
^{96}Tc	43	53	95.9078667(55)	1947	4.28(7) d	β^{+}	^{96}Mo	7+	
^{96m}Tc	34.23(4) keV			1953	51.5(10) min	IT (98.0%)	^{96}Tc	4+	
^{96m}Tc	34.23(4) keV			1953	51.5(10) min	β^{+} (2.0%)	^{96}Mo	4+	
^{97}Tc	43	54	96.9063607(44)	1947	4.21(16)×10^{6} y	EC	^{97}Mo	9/2+	
^{97m}Tc	96.57(6) keV			1954	91.1(6) d	IT (96.06%)	^{97}Tc	1/2−	
^{97m}Tc	96.57(6) keV			1954	91.1(6) d	EC (3.94%)	^{97}Mo	1/2−	
^{98}Tc	43	55	97.9072112(36)	1955	4.2(3)×10^{6} y	β^{−} (99.71%)	^{98}Ru	6+	
^{98}Tc	43	55	97.9072112(36)	1955	4.2(3)×10^{6} y	EC (0.29%)	^{98}Mo	6+	
^{98m}Tc	90.77(16) keV			1976	14.7(5) μs	IT	^{98}Tc	(2,3)−	
^{99}Tc (Note: Long-lived fission product)	43	56	98.90624968(97)	1938	2.111(12)×10^{5} y	β^{−}	^{99}Ru	9/2+	trace
^{99m}Tc (Note: Fission product) (Note: Used in medicine)	142.6836(11) keV			1938	6.0066(2) h	IT	^{99}Tc	1/2−	
^{99m}Tc	142.6836(11) keV			1938	6.0066(2) h	β^{−} (0.0037%)	^{99}Ru	1/2−	
^{100}Tc	43	57	99.9076527(15)	1952	15.46(19) s	β^{−}	^{100}Ru	1+	
^{100}Tc	43	57	99.9076527(15)	1952	15.46(19) s	EC (0.0018%)	^{100}Mo	1+	
^{100m1}Tc	200.67(4) keV			1978	8.32(14) μs	IT	^{100}Tc	(4)+	
^{100m2}Tc	243.95(4) keV			1967	3.2(2) μs	IT	^{100}Tc	(6)+	
^{101}Tc	43	58	100.907305(26)	1941	14.22(1) min	β^{−}	^{101}Ru	9/2+	
^{101m}Tc	207.526(20) keV			1968	636(8) μs	IT	^{101}Tc	1/2−	
^{102}Tc	43	59	101.9092072(98)	1954	5.28(15) s	β^{−}	^{102}Ru	1+	
^{102m}Tc (Note: Order of ground state and isomer is uncertain.)	50(50)# keV			1957	4.35(7) min	β^{−}	^{102}Ru	(4+)	
^{103}Tc	43	60	102.909174(11)	1957	54.2(8) s	β^{−}	^{103}Ru	5/2+	
^{104}Tc	43	61	103.911434(27)	1956	18.3(3) min	β^{−}	^{104}Ru	(3−)	
^{104m1}Tc	69.7(2) keV			1999	3.5(3) μs	IT	^{104}Tc	(5−)	
^{104m2}Tc	106.1(3) keV			1999	400(20) ns	IT	^{104}Tc	4#	
^{105}Tc	43	62	104.911662(38)	1955	7.64(6) min	β^{−}	^{105}Ru	(3/2−)	
^{106}Tc	43	63	105.914357(13)	1965	35.6(6) s	β^{−}	^{106}Ru	(1,2)(+#)	
^{107}Tc	43	64	106.9154584(93)	1965	21.2(2) s	β^{−}	^{107}Ru	(3/2−)	
^{107m1}Tc	30.1(1) keV			2007	3.85(5) μs	IT	^{107}Tc	(1/2+)	
^{107m2}Tc	65.72(14) keV			1998	184(3) ns	IT	^{107}Tc	(5/2+)	
^{108}Tc	43	65	107.9184935(94)	1970	5.17(7) s	β^{−}	^{108}Ru	(2)+	
^{109}Tc	43	66	108.920254(10)	1976	905(21) ms	β^{−} (99.92%)	^{109}Ru	(5/2+)	
^{109}Tc	43	66	108.920254(10)	1976	905(21) ms	β^{−}, n (0.08%)	^{108}Ru	(5/2+)	
^{110}Tc	43	67	109.923741(10)	1976	900(13) ms	β^{−} (99.96%)	^{110}Ru	(2+,3+)	
^{110}Tc	43	67	109.923741(10)	1976	900(13) ms	β^{−}, n (0.04%)	^{109}Ru	(2+,3+)	
^{111}Tc	43	68	110.925899(11)	1988	350(11) ms	β^{−} (99.15%)	^{111}Ru	5/2+#	
^{111}Tc	43	68	110.925899(11)	1988	350(11) ms	β^{−}, n (0.85%)	^{110}Ru	5/2+#	
^{112}Tc	43	69	111.9299417(59)	1990	323(6) ms	β^{−} (98.5%)	^{112}Ru	(2+)	
^{112}Tc	43	69	111.9299417(59)	1990	323(6) ms	β^{−}, n (1.5%)	^{111}Ru	(2+)	
^{112m}Tc	352.3(7) keV			2009	150(17) ns	IT	^{112}Tc		
^{113}Tc	43	70	112.9325690(36)	1992	152(8) ms	β^{−} (97.9%)	^{113}Ru	5/2+#	
^{113}Tc	43	70	112.9325690(36)	1992	152(8) ms	β^{−}, n (2.1%)	^{112}Ru	5/2+#	
^{113m}Tc	114.4(5) keV			2010	527(16) ns	IT	^{113}Tc	5/2−#	
^{114}Tc	43	71	113.93709(47)	1994	121(9) ms	β^{−} (98.7%)	^{114}Ru	5+#	
^{114}Tc	43	71	113.93709(47)	1994	121(9) ms	β^{−}, n (1.3%)	^{113}Ru	5+#	
^{114m}Tc	160(430) keV			2011	90(20) ms	β^{−} (98.7%)	^{114}Ru	1+#	
^{114m}Tc	160(430) keV			2011	90(20) ms	β^{−}, n (1.3%)	^{113}Ru	1+#	
^{115}Tc	43	72	114.94010(21)#	1994	78(2) ms	β^{−}	^{115}Ru	5/2+#	
^{116}Tc	43	73	115.94502(32)#	1997	57(3) ms	β^{−}	^{116}Ru	2+#	
^{117}Tc	43	74	116.94832(43)#	1997	44.5(30) ms	β^{−}	^{117}Ru	5/2+#	
^{118}Tc	43	75	117.95353(43)#	2010	30(4) ms	β^{−}	^{118}Ru	2+#	
^{119}Tc	43	76	118.95688(54)#	2010	22(3) ms	β^{−}	^{119}Ru	5/2+#	
^{120}Tc	43	77	119.96243(54)#	2010	21(5) ms	β^{−}	^{120}Ru	3+#	
^{121}Tc	43	78	120.96614(54)#	2015	22(6) ms	β^{−}	^{121}Ru	5/2+#	
^{122}Tc	43	79	121.97176(32)#	2018	13# ms [>550 ns]			1+#	
This table header & footer:

== Stability of technetium isotopes ==
Technetium and promethium are unusual light elements in that they have no stable isotopes. Using the liquid drop model for atomic nuclei, one can derive a semiempirical formula for the binding energy of a nucleus. This formula predicts a "valley of beta stability" along which nuclides do not undergo beta decay. Nuclides that lie "up the walls" of the valley tend to beta decay towards the center (by emitting an electron, emitting a positron, or capturing an electron). For a fixed number of nucleons A, the binding energies lie on one or more parabolas, with the most stable nuclide at the bottom. One can have more than one parabola because isotopes with an even number of protons and an even number of neutrons are more stable than isotopes with an odd number of neutrons and an odd number of protons. A single beta decay then transforms one into the other. When there is only one parabola, there can be only one stable isotope lying on that parabola. When there are two parabolas, that is, when the number of nucleons is even, it can happen (rarely) that there is a stable nucleus with an odd number of neutrons and an odd number of protons (although this happens only in five instances: ^{2}H, ^{6}Li, ^{10}B, ^{14}N and ^{180m}Ta). However, if this happens, there can be no stable isotope with an even number of neutrons and an even number of protons (180 is an exception, and ^{180m}Ta is only observationally stable).

For technetium (Z = 43), the valley of beta stability is centered at around 98 nucleons. However, for every number of nucleons from 94 to 102, there is already at least one stable nuclide of either molybdenum (Z = 42) or ruthenium (Z = 44), and the Mattauch isobar rule states that two adjacent isobars cannot both be stable. For the isotopes with odd numbers of nucleons, this immediately rules out a stable isotope of technetium, since there can be only one stable nuclide with a fixed odd number of nucleons. For the isotopes with an even number of nucleons, since technetium has an odd number of protons, any isotope must also have an odd number of neutrons. In such a case, the presence of a stable nuclide having the same number of nucleons and an even number of protons rules out the possibility of a stable nucleus.

== See also ==
Daughter products other than technetium

- Isotopes of ruthenium
- Isotopes of molybdenum
- Isotopes of niobium
