= Dihydroxylation =

Chemical reaction where an alkene is converted to a vicinal diol

Dihydroxylation is the process by which an alkene is converted into a vicinal diol. Although there are many routes to accomplish this oxidation, the most common and direct processes use a high-oxidation-state transition metal (typically osmium or manganese). The metal is often used as a catalyst, with some other stoichiometric oxidant present. In addition, other transition metals and non-transition metal methods have been developed and used to catalyze the reaction.

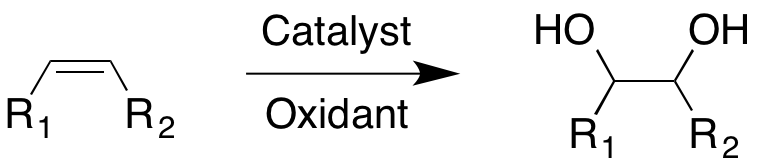

== Osmium catalyzed reactions ==
Osmium tetroxide (OsO_{4}) is a popular oxidant used in the dihydroxylation of alkenes because of its reliability and efficiency with producing syn-diols. Since it is expensive and toxic, catalytic amounts of OsO_{4} are used in conjunction with a stoichiometric oxidizing agent. The Milas hydroxylation, Upjohn dihydroxylation, and Sharpless asymmetric dihydroxylation reactions all use osmium as the catalyst as well as varying secondary oxidizing agents.

The Milas dihydroxylation was introduced in 1930, and uses hydrogen peroxide as the stoichiometric oxidizing agent. Although the method can produce diols, overoxidation to the dicarbonyl compound has led to difficulties isolating the vicinal diol. Therefore, the Milas protocol has been replaced by the Upjohn and Sharpless asymmetric dihydroxylation.

Upjohn dihydroxylation was reported in 1973 and uses OsO_{4} as the active catalyst in the dihydroxylation procedure. It also employs N-Methylmorpholine N-oxide (NMO) as the stoichiometric oxidant to regenerate the osmium catalyst, allowing for catalytic amounts of osmium to be used. The Upjohn protocol yields high conversions to the vicinal diol and tolerates many substrates. However, the protocol cannot dihydroxylate tetrasubstituted alkenes. The Upjohn conditions can be used for synthesizing anti-diols from allylic alcohols, as demonstrated by Kishi and coworkers.

=== Sharpless asymmetric ===
The Sharpless asymmetric dihydroxylation was developed by K. Barry Sharpless to use catalytic amounts of OsO_{4} along with the stoichiometric oxidant K_{3}[Fe(CN)_{6}]. The reaction is performed in the presence of a chiral auxiliary. The selection of dihydroquinidine (DHQD) or dihydroquinine (DHQ) as a chiral auxiliary dictates the facial selectivity of the olefin, since the absolute configuration of the ligands are opposite. The catalyst, oxidant, and chiral auxiliary can be purchased premixed for selective dihydroxylation. AD-mix-α contains the chiral auxiliary (DHQ)_{2}PHAL, which positions OsO_{4} on the alpha-face of the olefin; AD-mix-β contains (DHQD)_{2}PHAL and delivers hydroxyl groups to the beta-face. The Sharpless asymmetric dihydroxylation has a large scope for substrate selectivity by changing the chiral auxiliary class.

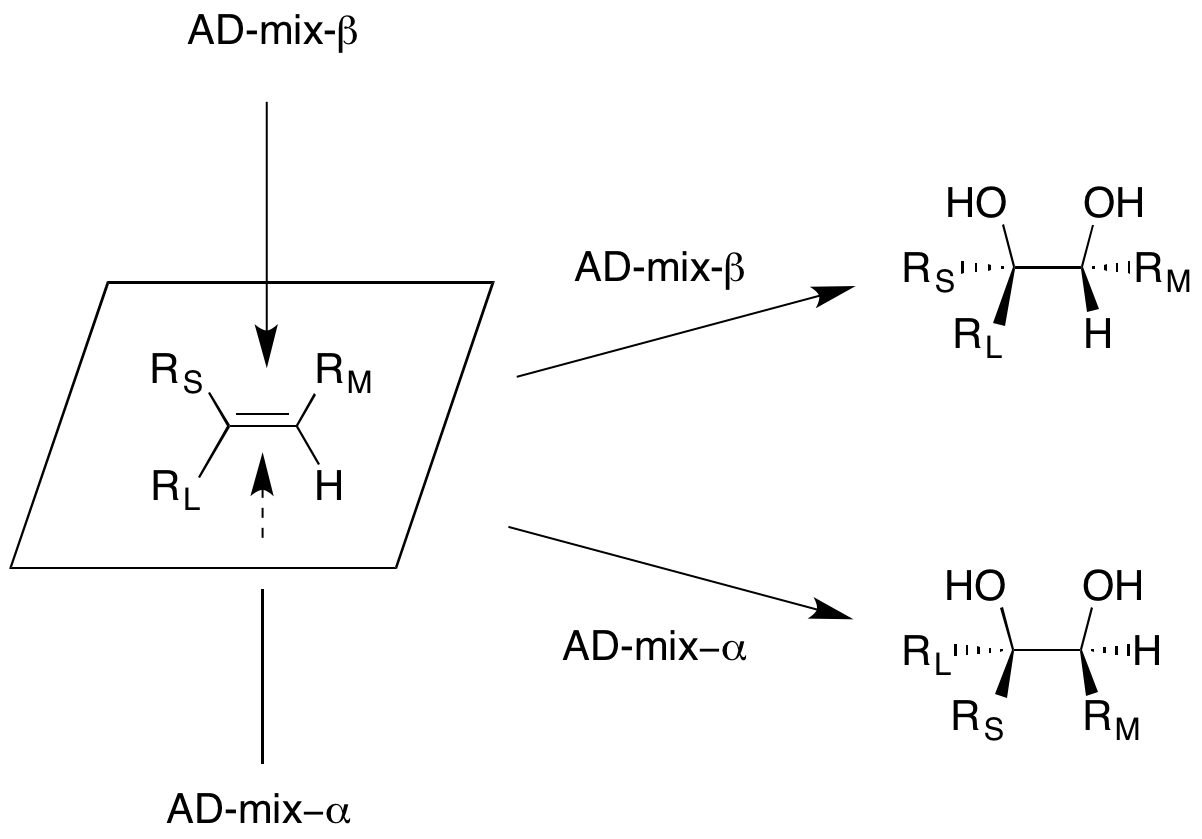
Mnemonic for the Sharpless asymmetric dihydroxylation

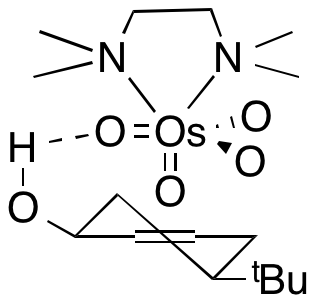

=== Applications of Sharpless methods ===
The synthesis of highly substituted and stereospecific sugars has been achieved by Sharpless-based methods. Kakelokelose is one specific example.

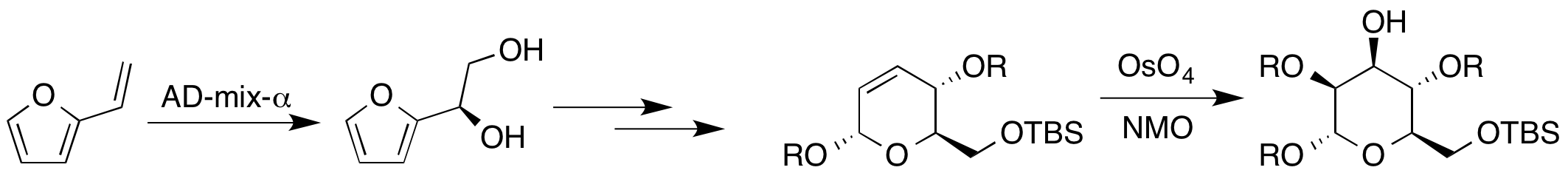

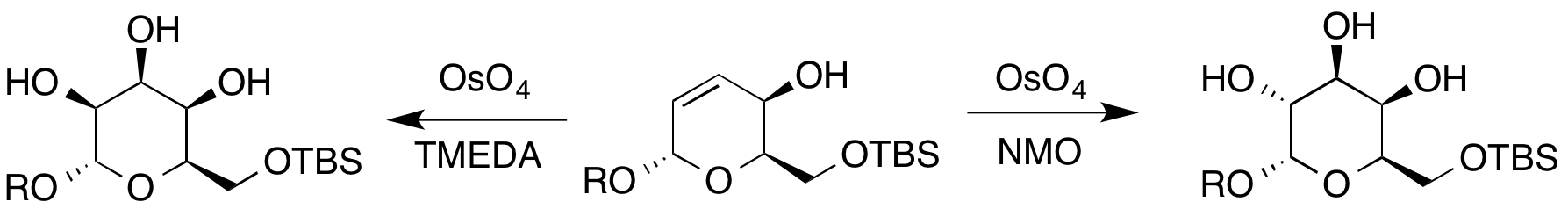

=== Mechanism ===
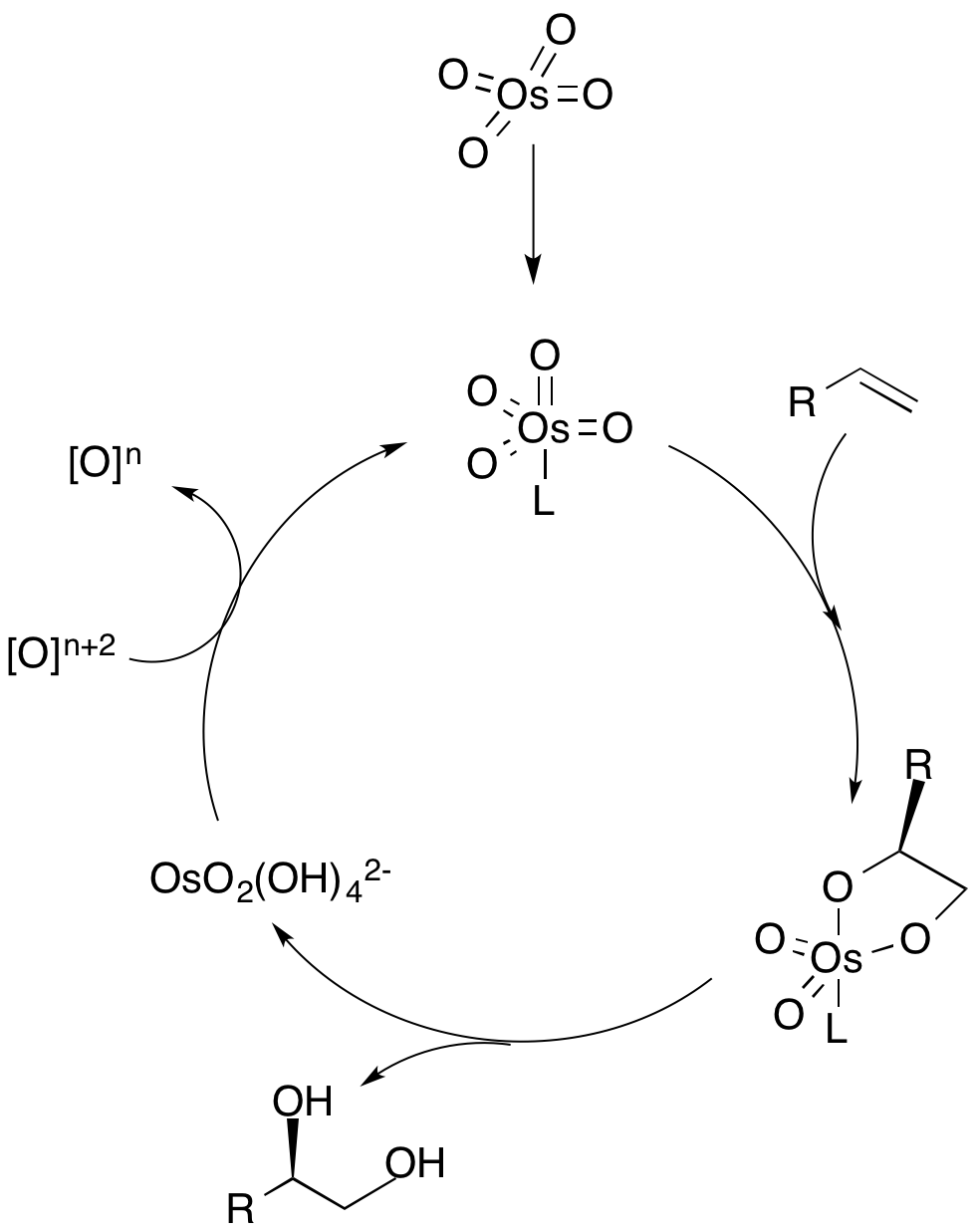
Mechanism for dihydroxylation using osmium tetroxide.

In the dihydroxylation mechanism, a ligand first coordinates to the metal catalyst (depicted as osmium), which dictates the chiral selectivity of the olefin. The alkene then coordinates to the metal through a (3+2) cycloaddition, and the ligand dissociates from the metal catalyst. Hydrolysis of the olefin then yields the vicinal diol, and oxidation of the catalyst by a stoichiometric oxidant regenerates the metal catalyst to repeat the cycle. The concentration of the olefin is crucial to the enantiomeric excess of the diol since higher concentrations of the alkene can associate with the other catalytic site to produce the other enantiomer.

=== More variants ===
As mentioned above, the ability to synthesize anti-diols from allylic alcohols can be achieved with the use of NMO as a stoichiometric oxidant. The use of tetramethylenediamine (TMEDA) as a ligand produced syn-diols with a favorable diastereomeric ratio compared to Kishi’s protocol; however, stoichiometric osmium is employed. Syn-selectivity is due to the hydrogen bond donor ability of the allylic alcohol and the acceptor ability of the diamine. This has since been applied to homoallylic systems.

=== Alternative to Os-based reagents ===
Ruthenium-based reagents are rapid. Typically, the ruthenium tetroxide is created in situ from ruthenium trichloride, and the oxidant NaIO_{4}. The turnover-limiting step of the reaction is the hydrolysis step; therefore, sulfuric acid is added to increase the rate of this step.

Manganese is also used in dihydroxylation and is often chosen when osmium tetroxide methods yield poor results. Similar to ruthenium, the oxidation potential of manganese is high, leading to over-oxidation of substrates. Potassium permanganate is often used as the oxidant for dihydroxylation; however, due to its poor solubility in organic solvent, a phase-transfer catalyst (such as benzyltriethylammonium chloride, TEBACl) is also added to increase the number of substrates for dihydroxylation. Mild conditions are required to avoid over-oxidation. In particular, a solution that is too warm, acidic, or concentrated will lead to cleavage of the glycol.

== Arene dihydroxylations ==
The dihydroxylation of aromatic compounds gives dihydrocatechols and related derivatives. The conversions are catalyzed by several enzymes, notably toluene dioxygenases (TDs) and benzene 1,2-dioxygenase.

(1)

cis-1,2-Dihydrocatechol is a versatile synthetic intermediate.

== Prévost and Woodward dihydroxylation ==
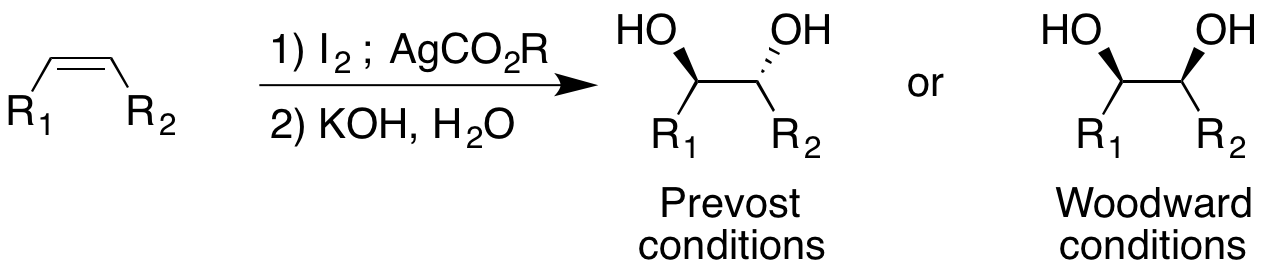
Scheme of the Prevost and Woodward Reactions.

Unlike the other methods described that use transition metals as catalyst, the Prévost and Woodward methods use iodine and a silver salt. However, the addition of water into the reaction directs the cis- and trans- addition of the hydroxyl groups. The Prévost reaction typically uses silver benzoate to produce trans-diols; the Woodward modification of the Prévost reaction uses silver acetate to produce cis-diols. In both the Prévost and Woodward reactions, iodine is first added to the alkene producing a cyclic iodinium ion. The anion from the corresponding silver salt is then added by nucleophilic substitution to the iodinium ion.

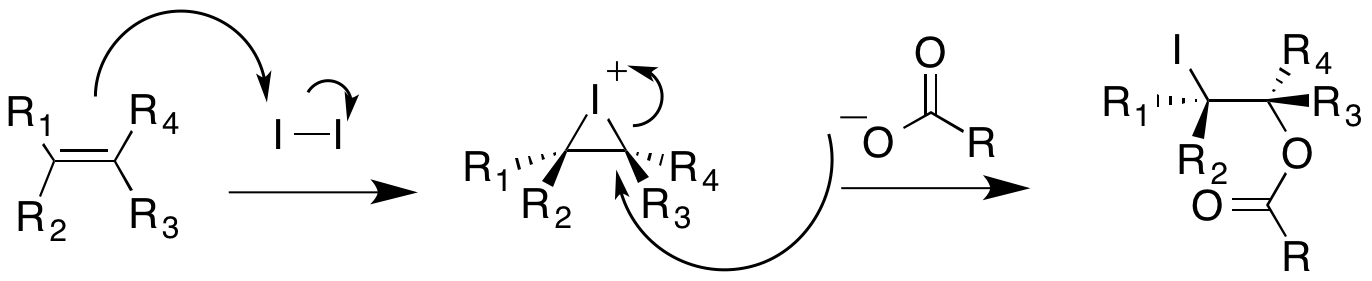
The first step of the Prevost and Woodward hydroxylation methods.

In the Prévost reaction, the iodinium ion undergoes nucleophilic attack by benzoate anion. The benzoate anion acts as a nucleophile again to displace iodide through a neighboring-group participation mechanism. A second benzoate anion reacts with the intermediate to produce the anti-substituted dibenzoate product, which can then undergo hydrolysis to yield trans-diols.

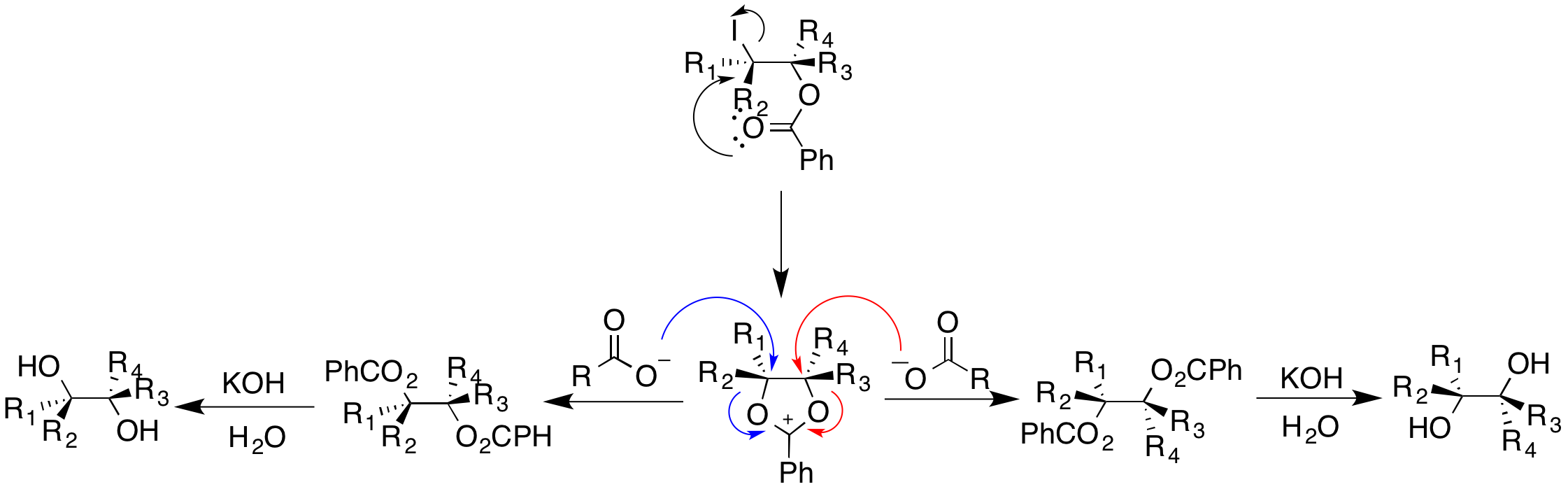
The Prevost reaction mechanism.

The Woodward modification of the Prévost reaction yields cis-diols. Acetate anion reacts with the cyclic iodinium ion to yield an oxonium ion intermediate. This can then readily react with water to give the monoacetate, which can then be hydrolyzed to give a cis-diol

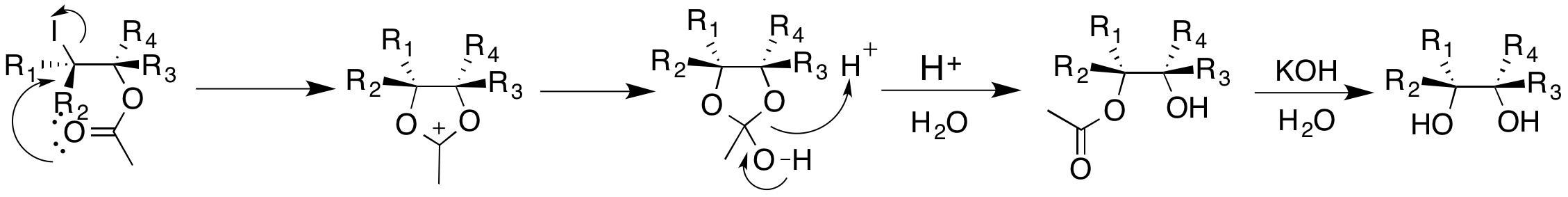
The Woodward reaction mechanism.

To eliminate the need for silver salts, Sudalai and coworkers modified the Prévost-Woodward reaction; the reaction is catalyzed with LiBr, and uses NaIO_{4} and PhI(OAc)_{2} as oxidants. LiBr reacts with NaIO_{4} and acetic acid to produce lithium acetate, which can then proceed through the reaction as previously mentioned. The protocol produced high dr for the corresponding diol, depending on the oxidant chosen.

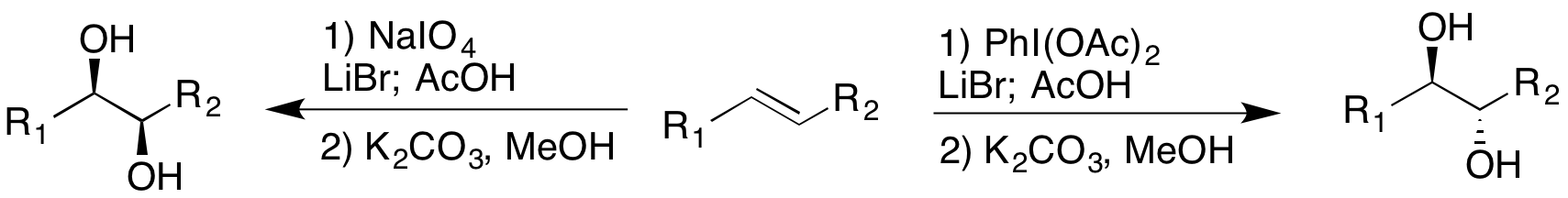
The modification of the Prevost-Woodward reaction proposed by Sudalai.

=== Application of both Woodward and Sharpless methods ===
Dihydroxylation methods have been investigated for the synthesis of steroids. Brassinosteroids, which is a potential insecticide, has a stereochemically-rich array of hydroxy substituents. The hydroxyl groups in the steroid can be using both Woodward conditions to yield a cis-diol to the A ring of the steroid. Then, the alkene chain on the D ring was dihydroxylated to yield the second cis-diol using OsO_{4} and NMO as the stoichiometric oxidant.

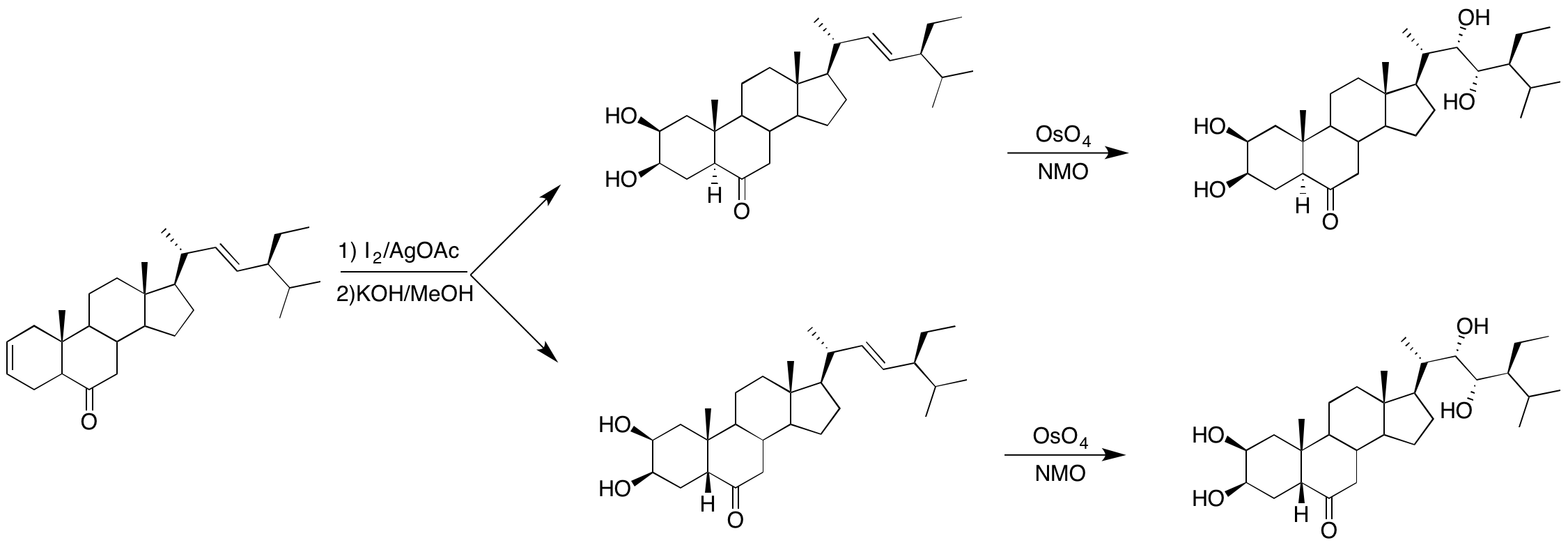
Reactions showcasing dihydroxylation steps.
