= Lemieux–Johnson oxidation =

Chemical reaction

The Lemieux–Johnson or Malaprade–Lemieux–Johnson oxidation is a chemical reaction in which an olefin undergoes oxidative cleavage to form two aldehyde or ketone units. The reaction is named after its inventors, Raymond Urgel Lemieux and William Summer Johnson, who published it in 1956. The reaction proceeds in a two step manner, beginning with dihydroxylation of the alkene by osmium tetroxide, followed by a Malaprade reaction to cleave the diol using periodate. Periodate also serves to regenerate the osmium tetroxide. This means only a catalytic amount of the osmium reagent is needed and also that the two consecutive reactions can be performed as a single tandem reaction process. The Lemieux–Johnson reaction ceases at the aldehyde stage of oxidation and therefore produces the same results as ozonolysis.

The classical Lemieux–Johnson oxidation often generates many side products, resulting in low reaction yields; however the addition of non-nucleophilic bases, such as 2,6-lutidine, can improve on this. OsO_{4} may be replaced with a number of other Osmium compounds. Periodate may also be replaced with other oxidising agents, such as oxone.

== History ==
The development of the Lemieux–Johnson oxidation was preceded by an analogous process, developed by Lemieux and Ernst Von Rudloff (sometimes called the Lemieux-Von Rudloff reaction), which used an aqueous solution of sodium periodate with a low (catalytic) concentration of potassium permanganate. This mixture became known as Lemieux reagent and has been used to determine the position of double bonds and for preparing carbonyl compounds. Unlike the Lemieux–Johnson oxidation, which normally stops at the aldehyde, this older method could continue to give a mixture of aldehydes and carboxylic acids.

== See also ==
- Upjohn dihydroxylation
- Milas hydroxylation
- Sharpless asymmetric dihydroxylation
- Ozonolysis
