= Microbial arene oxidation =

Microbial arene oxidation (MAO) refers to the process by which microbial enzymes convert aromatic compounds into more oxidized products. The initial intermediates are arene oxides. A number of oxidized products are possible, the most commonly employed for organic synthesis are cis-1,2-dihydroxy-cyclohexa-3,5-dienes ("dihydrodiols").

The oxidation of aromatic compounds to dearomatized products is a step in the catabolism of arenes. Seminal work on this area was reported by Gibson on enzymes inPseudomonas putida. The following of enzymes have been identified that oxidize arenes to dihydrodiols:

- Toluene dioxygenases (TDs)
- Naphthalene dioxygenases (NDs)
- Biphenyl dioxygenases (BPDs)
- Benzoic acid dioxygenases (BZDs)
- Benzene 1,2-dioxygenase

The substrate specificity of these enzymes is low. Enantiomeric purities in excess of 90% are routine but varies with substrate. For instance, 1,4-substituted benzenes often render diols of lower enantiomeric purity. However, accessing the "unnatural" enantiomer of product is often difficult without tailored enzymes.

(1)

== Mechanism and stereochemistry ==
Oxidations by bacterial dioxygenases give cis-dihydrodiols. In contrast, mammalian and fungal arene dioxygenases yield trans-dihydrodiols. The cis configuration of the product together with isotopic labeling studies implicate the intermediacy of dioxetanes. This intermediate has not been observed, however.

cis-1,2-Dihydrocatechol is a versatile synthetic intermediate.

== Scope ==
Toluene dioxygenase oxidizes toluene to 1,2-dihydroxyl-6-methylcyclohexa-3,5-diene. Aromatic esters are also good substrates for these enzymes, giving dihydrodiols in moderate yields along with some other oxidation products.

Naphthalene dioxygenase is found in a variety of Pseudomonas organisms. It catalyzes the oxidation of other polyclic aromatic compounds as well, although yields tend to be low for substrates other than naphthalene.

Biphenyl dioxygenase oxidizes a relatively wide array of aromatic substrates and exhibits low substrate specificity. Biphenyl oxidation can also be accomplished using TDOs or NDOs.

The site selectivity of BZDs differs from that of the other three classes. Oxidation takes place in an ipso-cis fashion, independent of the substitution pattern of the arene.

Undesirable oxidized side products are often observed during microbial arene oxidations, particularly for "unnatural" substrates. Benzylic oxidation has been noted in a number of cases. Sulfides are always oxidized to sulfoxides.

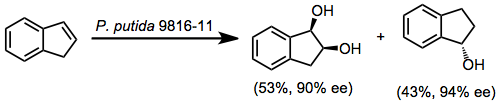

An important limitation of the reaction is that only a single enantiomer of product is available when the wild type enzyme is used. Enzymes that generate "unnatural" enantiomers must be engineered via site-directed mutagenesis or other biochemical techniques. The development of organisms and enzymes that exhibit "unnatural" stereoselectivity is an ongoing research activity.

Because of concerns about the efficiency and selectivity of oxidation of more complex substrates, MAO is usually carried out early in synthetic sequences. However, simple dihydrodiols may be manipulated to give complex products through a variety of methods. In addition, the microbial oxidation process is compatible with a number of functional groups.

Iodo-containing dihydrodiols may be accessed by the oxidation of iodobenzene.

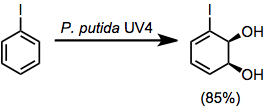

Dihydrodiols have been elaborated to a variety of alkaloid natural products. Two examples are shown below.

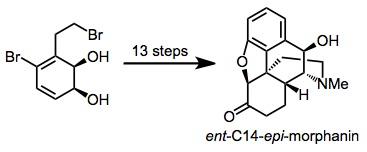

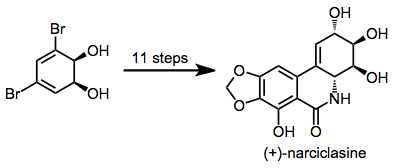

Conditions of MAO reactions require handling microbes in an aseptic environment. Often, specialized bacterial strains are needed to effect particular transformations. Dihydrodiols themselves must be stored under basic conditions (pH > 9) to prevent acid-catalyzed dehydration.
