= C20H26N2O2 =

The molecular formula C_{20}H_{26}N_{2}O_{2} (molar mass: 326.4 g/mol) may refer to:

- Ajmaline
- Dihydroquinidine
- Dihydroquinine
- Epsiprantel
- Tortuosamine
- Vincaminol
