= Hassium tetroxide =

- Stick model hassium tetroxide

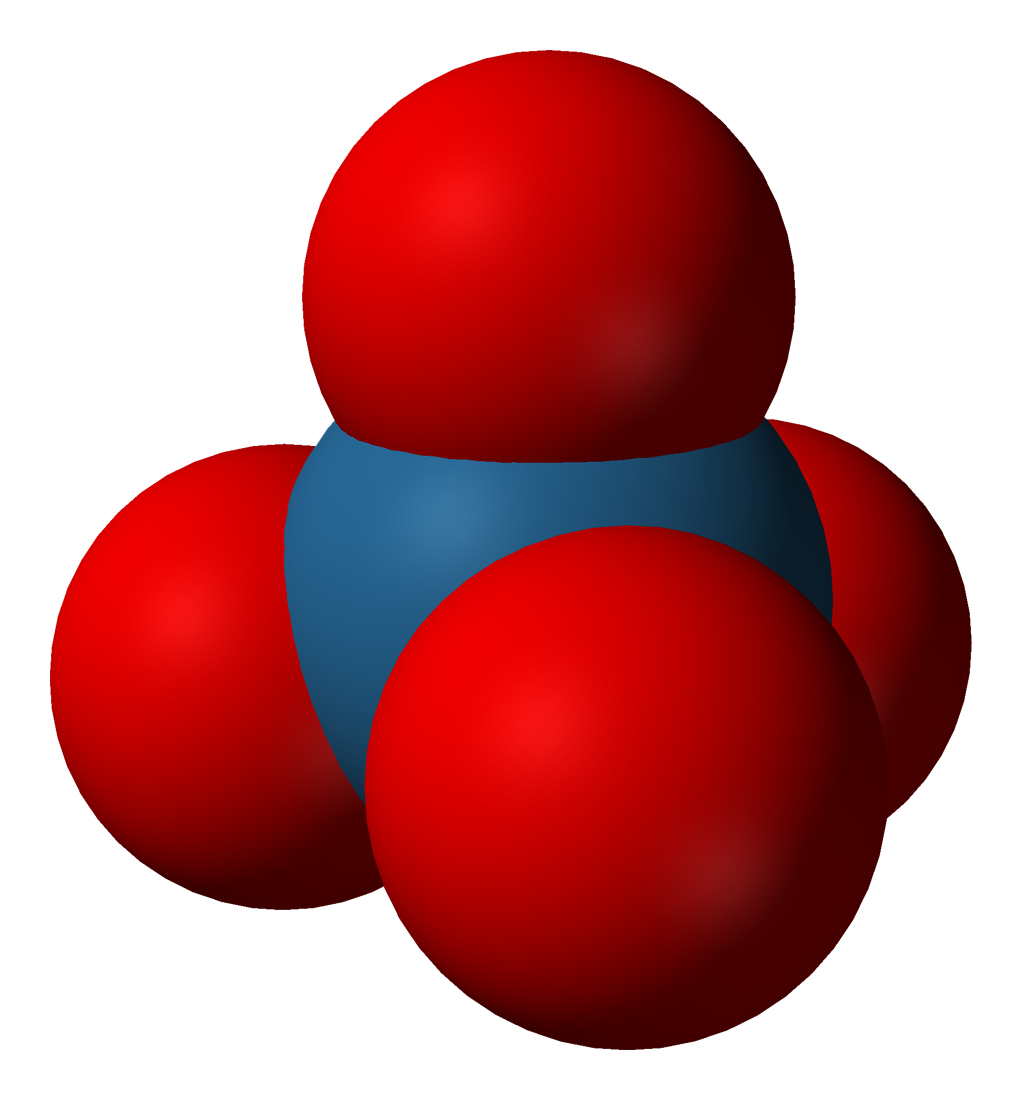

Names
- Preferred IUPAC name Hassium tetraoxide
- Systematic IUPAC name Tetraoxohassium
- Other names Hassium(VIII) oxide

Identifiers
3D model (JSmol)	Interactive image
- InChI: InChI=1S/4O.Hs Key: ZEDIDOIMNXPGSR-UHFFFAOYSA-N
- SMILES: O=[Hs](=O)(=O)=O

Properties
Chemical formula	HsO_{4}
Molar mass	334 g·mol^{−1}

Structure
Molecular shape	tetrahedral (predicted)

Related compounds
Other cations	Ruthenium(VIII) oxide Osmium(VIII) oxide
- Except where otherwise noted, data are given for materials in their standard state (at 25 °C [77 °F], 100 kPa). Infobox references

Hassium tetroxide (also hassium(VIII) oxide) is the inorganic compound with the formula HsO_{4}. It is the highest oxide of hassium, a transactinide transition metal. It has little use outside of scientific interest, where it is often studied in comparison to osmium tetroxide and ruthenium tetroxide, its lighter octavalent group 8 element analogs.

== Physical properties ==
Because of the extreme cost and difficulty of producing hassium, hassium tetroxide has never been obtained in macroscopic amounts, as only a few molecules have ever been synthesized. As a result, many of its physical properties are experimentally uncharacterized and unknown. However, most research available generally shows hassium tetroxide to behave like a typical congener to osmium tetroxide. Hassium tetroxide is less volatile than osmium tetroxide.

== Synthesis ==
Hassium tetroxide can be obtained by reacting atomic hassium with oxygen at 600 °C.

Hs + 2 O_{2} → HsO_{4}

== Reactions ==
Hassium tetroxide can be combined with sodium hydroxide in an acid-base reaction, in which case it acts like the acid, to form sodium hassate(VIII):

HsO_{4} + 2 NaOH → Na_{2}[HsO_{4}(OH)_{2}]

== Sources ==
- Hoffman, D. C.; Lee, D. M.; Pershina, V. (2006). "Transactinides and the future elements". In Morss, L. R.; Edelstein, N. M.; Fuger, J. (eds.). The Chemistry of the Actinide and Transactinide Elements. Vol. 3 (3rd ed.). Dordrecht, The Netherlands: Springer. pp. 1652–1752. ISBN 1-4020-3555-1.
