= AD-mix =

Chemical reagent mixture

In organic chemistry, AD-mix is a commercially available mixture of reagents that acts as an asymmetric catalyst for various chemical reactions, including the Sharpless asymmetric dihydroxylation of alkenes. The two letters AD, stand for asymmetric dihydroxylation. The mix is available in two variations, "AD-mix α" and "AD-mix β" following ingredient lists published by Barry Sharpless.

The mixes contain:

- Potassium osmate K_{2}OsO_{2}(OH)_{4} as the source of Osmium tetroxide
- Potassium ferricyanide K_{3}Fe(CN)_{6}, which is the re-oxidant in the catalytic cycle
- Potassium carbonate
- A chiral ligand:
  - AD-mix α contains (DHQ)_{2}PHAL, the phthalazine adduct with dihydroquinine

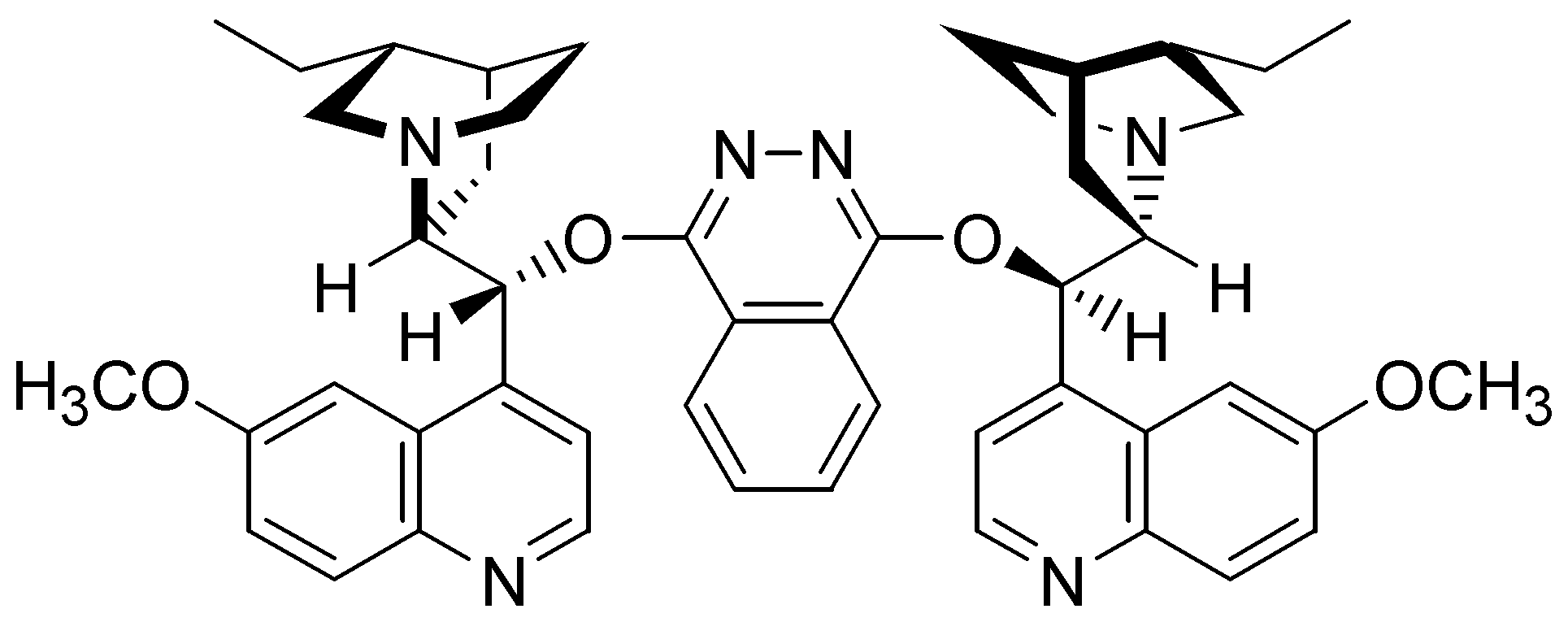

- AD-mix β contains (DHQD)_{2}PHAL, the phthalazine adduct with dihydroquinidine

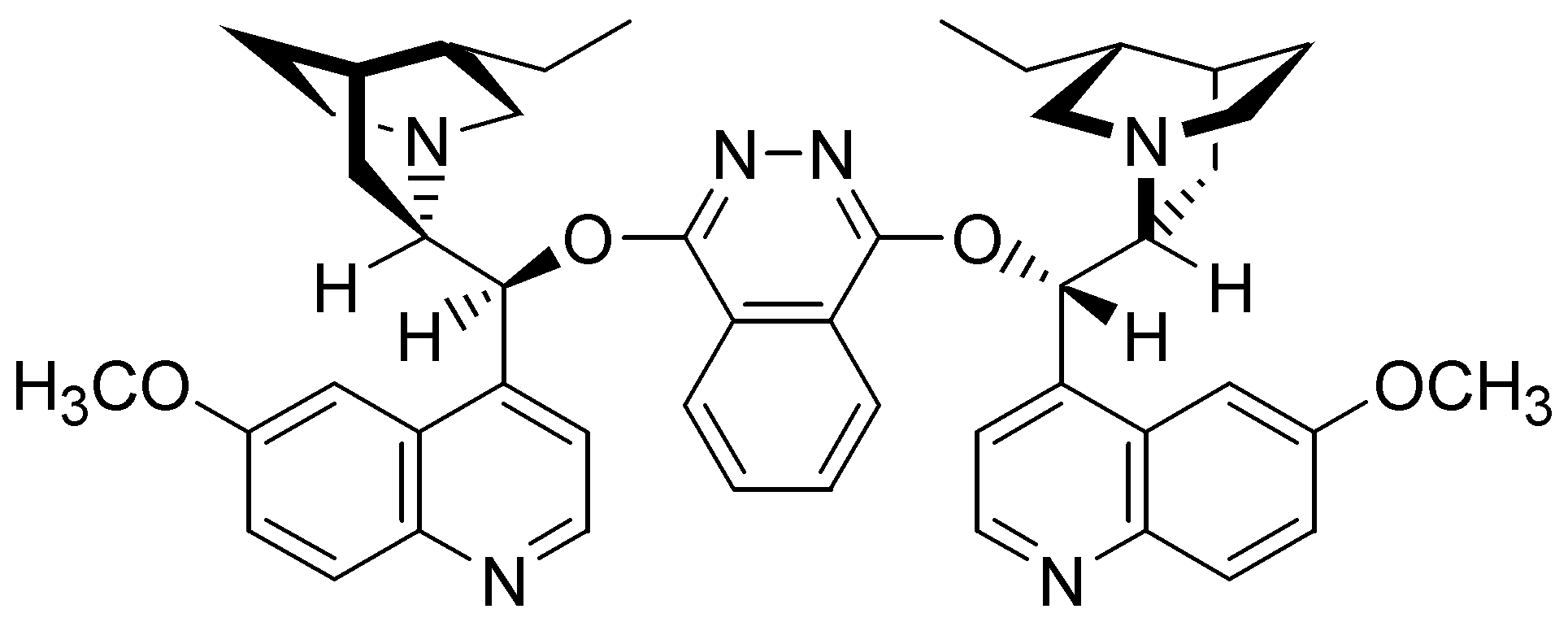
