= Osmium tetrasulfide =

Names
- Other names Osmium(VIII) sulphide, tetrakis(sulfanylidene)osmium

Identifiers
| 3D model (JSmol) | Interactive image |
| PubChem CID | 149252039 |
- InChI: InChI=1S/Os.4S Key: CQZYSTFQZYMZKW-UHFFFAOYSA-N
- SMILES: S=[Os](=S)(=S)=S

Properties
| Chemical formula | OsS_{4} |
| Molar mass | 318.47 g·mol^{−1} |
| Appearance | dark brown crystals |
| Solubility in water | insoluble |
- Except where otherwise noted, data are given for materials in their standard state (at 25 °C [77 °F], 100 kPa). Infobox references

Osmium tetrasulfide is an inorganic compound, a salt of osmium metal and hydrogen sulfide acid with the chemical formula OsS_{4}.

== Properties ==
Osmium tetrasulfide forms dark brown crystals. It does not dissolve in cold water. It is soluble in dilute nitric acid. It forms hydrates.

Osmium tetrasulfide decomposes upon melting.

== Synthesis ==
Osmium tetrasulfide can be made by passing hydrogen sulfide through acidified solutions of osmium tetroxide:

OsO_{4} + 4H_{2}S → OsS_{4} + 4H_{2}O
