= William Summer Johnson =

American chemist and teacher (1913–1995)

William Summer Johnson (February 24, 1913 – August 19, 1995) was an American chemist and teacher.

From 1940 to 1958, Johnson was an instructor and then professor at the University of Wisconsin–Madison. In 1958, he moved to Stanford University in California where he spent the remainder of his scientific career. He did important research in the artificial production of steroids and was awarded the National Medal of Science in 1987.

The Lemieux–Johnson oxidation, in which an olefin is converted into two aldehyde or ketone fragments, is named after him and Raymond Lemieux.

== Education ==
- PhD, Harvard University (1940)
- AM, Harvard University
- BA, magna cum laude, Amherst College (1936)

== Awards ==
- 1968 William H. Nichols Medal
- 1987 National Medal of Science
- 1989 Arthur C. Cope Award.
- 1991 Tetrahedron Prize for Creativity in Organic Chemistry & BioMedicinal Chemistry
