= Sharpless asymmetric dihydroxylation =

Chemical reaction

Named after	Karl Barry Sharpless
Reaction type	Addition reaction

Reaction
Alkene
+
OsO_{4}
+
Chiral quinine ligand
↓
1,2-diol (main product)

Identifiers
Organic Chemistry Portal	sharpless-dihydroxylation
RSC ontology ID	RXNO:0000142

Sharpless asymmetric dihydroxylation (also called the Sharpless bishydroxylation) is the chemical reaction of an alkene with osmium tetroxide in the presence of a chiral quinine ligand to form a vicinal diol. The reaction has been applied to alkenes of virtually every substitution, often high enantioselectivities are realized, with the chiral outcome controlled by the choice of dihydroquinidine (DHQD) vs dihydroquinine (DHQ) as the ligand. Asymmetric dihydroxylation reactions are also highly site selective, providing products derived from reaction of the most electron-rich double bond in the substrate.

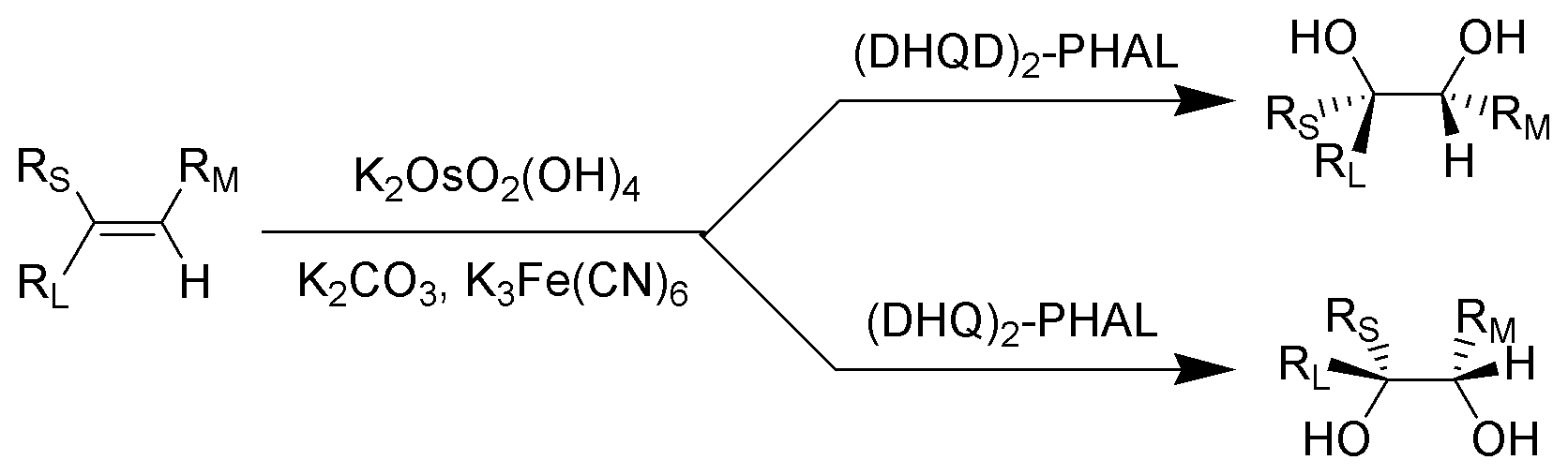
The Sharpless dihydroxylation. R_{L} = Largest substituent; R_{M} = Medium-sized substituent; R_{S} = Smallest substituent

It is common practice to perform this reaction using a catalytic amount of osmium tetroxide, which after reaction is regenerated with reoxidants such as potassium ferricyanide or N-methylmorpholine N-oxide. This dramatically reduces the amount of the highly toxic and very expensive osmium tetroxide needed. These four reagents are commercially available premixed ("AD-mix"). The mixture containing (DHQ)_{2}-PHAL is called AD-mix-α, and the mixture containing (DHQD)_{2}-PHAL is called AD-mix-β.

Such chiral diols are important in organic synthesis. The introduction of chirality into nonchiral reactants through usage of chiral catalysts is an important concept in organic synthesis. This reaction was developed principally by K. Barry Sharpless building on the already known racemic Upjohn dihydroxylation, for which he was awarded a share of the 2001 Nobel Prize in Chemistry.

== Background ==
Alkene dihydroxylation by osmium tetroxide is an old and extremely useful method for the functionalization of alkenes. However, since osmium(VIII) reagents like osmium tetroxide (OsO_{4}) are expensive and extremely toxic, it has become desirable to develop catalytic variants of this reaction. Some stoichiometric terminal oxidants that have been employed in these catalytic reactions include potassium chlorate, hydrogen peroxide (Milas hydroxylation), N-Methylmorpholine N-oxide (NMO, Upjohn dihydroxylation), tert-butyl hydroperoxide (tBHP), and potassium ferricyanide (K_{3}Fe(CN)_{6}). K. Barry Sharpless was the first to develop a general, reliable enantioselective alkene dihydroxylation, referred to as the Sharpless asymmetric dihydroxylation (SAD). Low levels of OsO_{4} are combined with a stoichiometric ferricyanide oxidant in the presence of chiral nitrogenous ligands to create an asymmetric environment around the oxidant.

== Reaction mechanism ==
The reaction mechanism of the Sharpless dihydroxylation begins with the formation of the osmium tetroxide – ligand complex (2). A [3+2]-cycloaddition with the alkene (3) gives the cyclic intermediate 4. Basic hydrolysis liberates the diol (5) and the reduced osmate (6). Methanesulfonamide (CH_{3}SO_{2}NH_{2}) has been identified as a catalyst to accelerate this step of the catalytic cycle and if frequently used as an additive to allow non-terminal alkene substrates to react efficiently at 0 °C. Finally, the stoichiometric oxidant regenerates the osmium tetroxide – ligand complex (2).

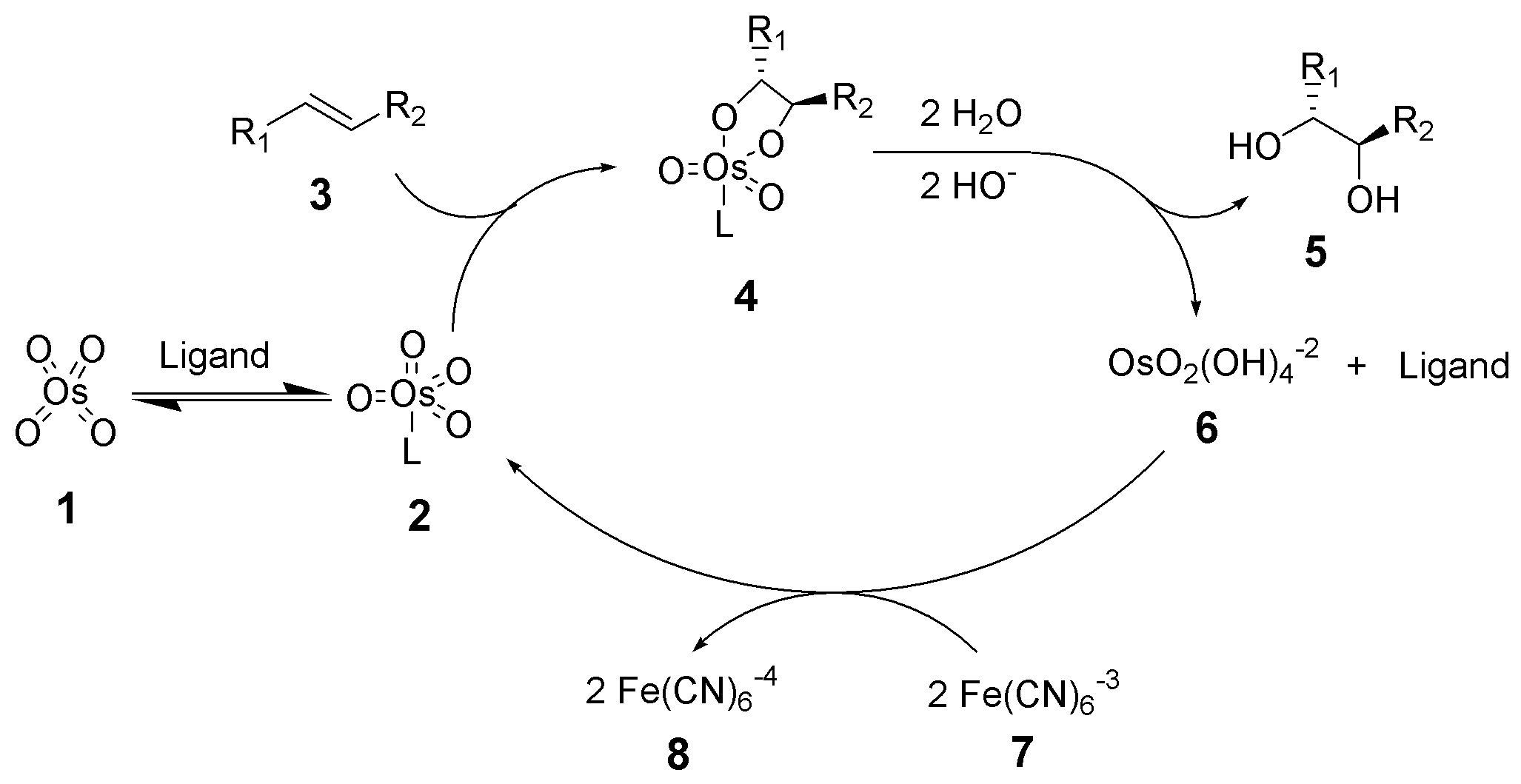
The reaction mechanism of the Sharpless dihydroxylation

The mechanism of the Sharpless asymmetric dihydroxylation has been extensively studied and a potential secondary catalytic cycle has been identified (see below). If the osmylate ester intermediate is oxidized before it dissociates, then an osmium(VIII)-diol complex is formed which may then dihydroxylate another alkene. Dihydroxylations resulting from this secondary pathway generally suffer lower enantioselectivities than those resulting from the primary pathway. A schematic showing this secondary catalytic pathway is shown below. This secondary pathway may be suppressed by using a higher molar concentration of ligand.

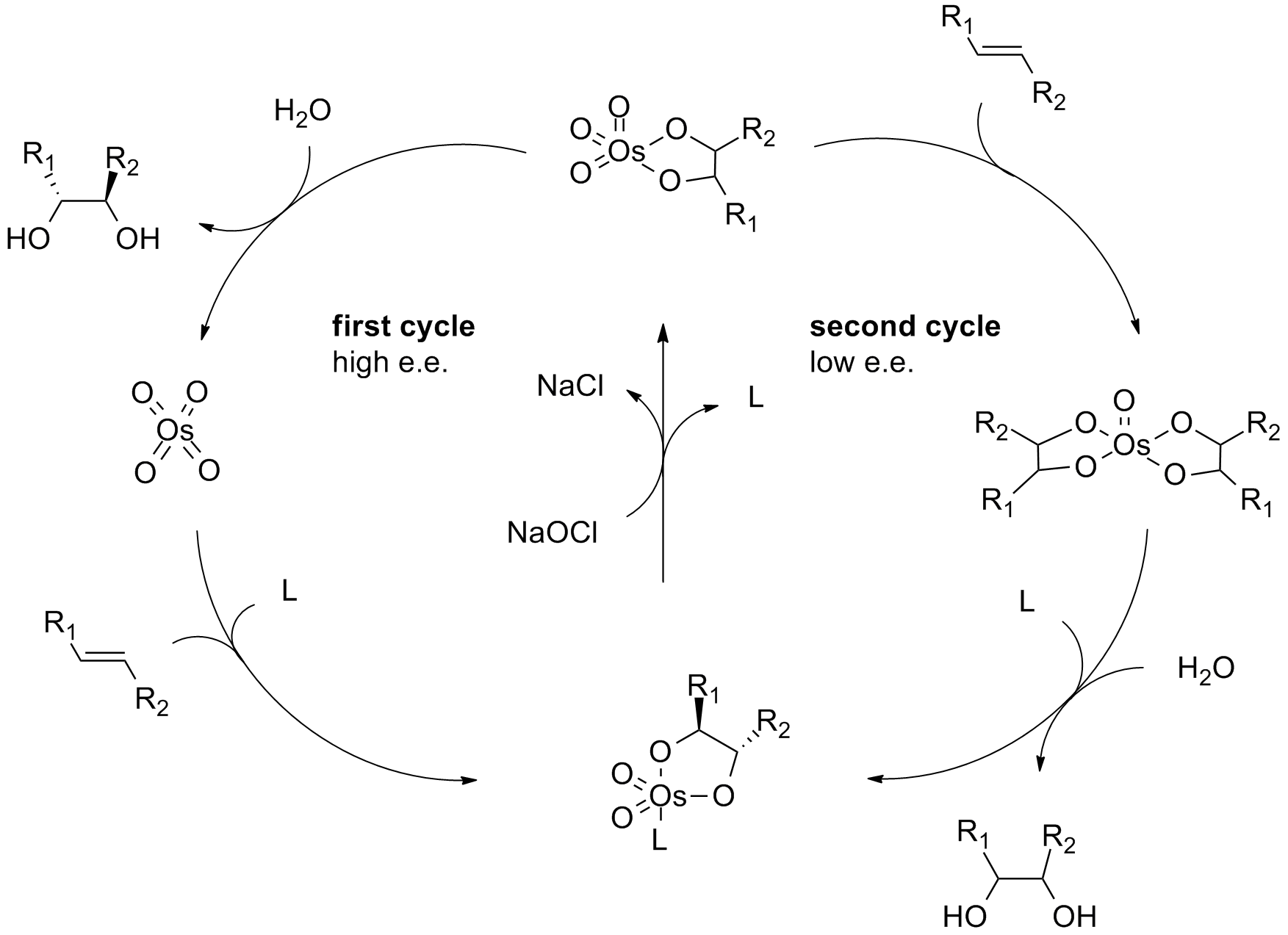
Catalytic cycle of the Sharpless asymmetric dihydroxylation

=== [2+2] vs [3+2] debate ===
In his original report Sharpless suggested the reaction proceeded via a [2+2] cycloaddition of OsO_{4} onto the alkene to give an osmaoxetane intermediate (see below). This intermediate would then undergo a 1,1- migratory insertion to form an osmylate ester which after hydrolysis would give the corresponding diol. In 1989 E. J. Corey published a slightly different variant of this reaction and suggested that the reaction most likely proceeded via a [3+2] cycloaddition of OsO_{4} with the alkene to directly generate the osmylate ester. Corey's suggestion was based on a previous computational study done by Jorgensen and Hoffmann which determined the [3+2] reaction pathway to be the lower energy pathway. In addition Corey reasoned that steric repulsions in the octahedral intermediate would disfavor the [2+2] pathway.

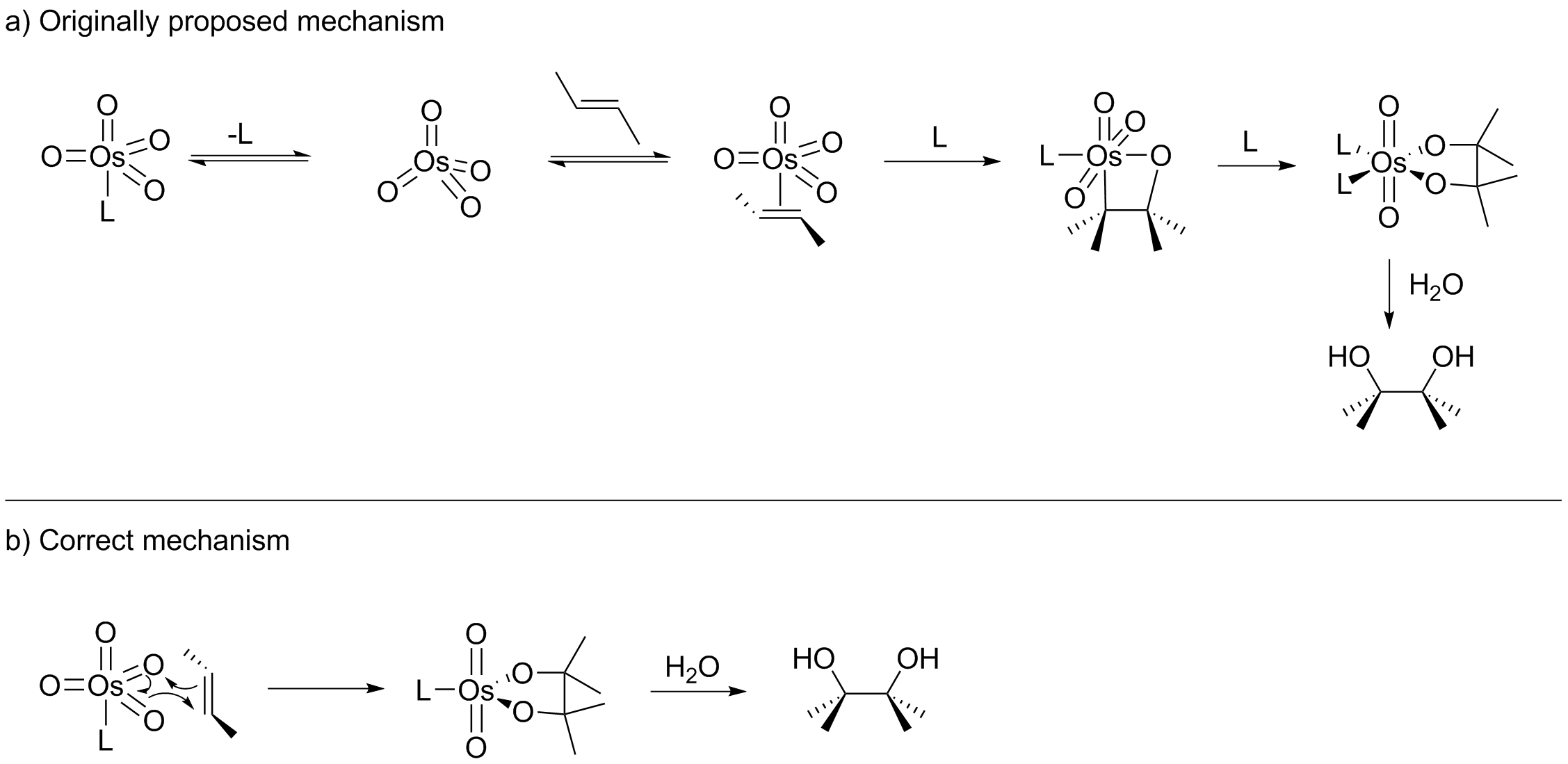
Osmium tetroxide dihydroxylation proposed and correct mechanism

The next ten years saw numerous publications by both Corey and Sharpless, each supporting their own version of the mechanism. While these studies were not able to distinguish between the two proposed cyclization pathways, they were successful in shedding light on the mechanism in other ways. For example, Sharpless provided evidence for the reaction proceeding via a step-wise mechanism. Additionally both Sharpless and Corey showed that the active catalyst possesses a U-shaped chiral binding pocket. Corey also showed that the catalyst obeys Michaelis-Menten kinetics and acts like an enzyme pocket with a pre-equilibrium. In the February 1997 issue of the Journal of the American Chemical Society Sharpless published the results of a study (a Hammett analysis) which he claimed supported a [2+2] cyclization over a [3+2]. In the October issue of the same year, however, Sharpless also published the results of another study conducted in collaboration with Ken Houk and Singleton which provided conclusive evidence for the [3+2] mechanism. Thus Sharpless was forced to concede the decade-long debate.

=== Catalyst structure ===
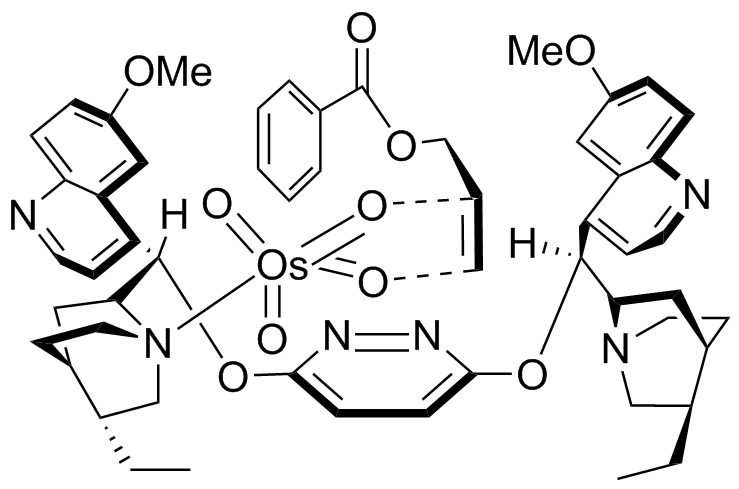
Allyl benzoate bound within the U-shaped binding pocket of the active dihydroquinidine catalyst, osmium tetroxide interacting with the Re face.

Crystallographic evidence has shown that the active catalyst possesses a pentacoordinate osmium species held in a U-shaped binding pocket. The nitrogenous ligand holds OsO_{4} in a chiral environment making approach of one side of the olefin sterically hindered while the other is not.

== Catalytic systems ==
Numerous catalytic systems and modifications have been developed for the SAD. Given below is a brief overview of the various components of the catalytic system:

- Catalytic oxidant: This is always OsO_{4}, however certain additives can coordinate to the osmium(VIII) and modify its electronic properties. OsO_{4} is often generated in situ from K_{2}OsO_{2}(OH)_{4} (an Os(VI) species) due to safety concerns.
- Chiral auxiliary: This is usually some kind of cinchona alkaloid.
- Stoichiometric oxidant:
  - Peroxides were among the first stoichiometric oxidants to be used in this catalytic cycle; see the Milas hydroxylation. Drawbacks of peroxides include chemoselectivity issues.
  - Trialkylammonium N-oxides, such as NMO—as in the Upjohn reaction—and trimethylamine N-oxide.
  - Potassium ferricyanide (K_{3}Fe(CN)_{6}) is the most commonly used stoichiometric oxidant for the reaction, and is the oxidant that comes in the commercially available AD-mix preparations.
- Additive:
  - Citric acid: Osmium tetroxide is an electrophilic oxidant and as such reacts slowly with electron-deficient olefins. It has been found that the rate of oxidation of electron-deficient olefins can be accelerated by maintaining the pH of the reaction slightly acidic. On the other hand, a high pH can increase the rate of oxidation of internal olefins, and also increase the enantiomeric excess (e.e.) for the oxidation of terminal olefins.

== Regioselectivity ==
In general Sharpless asymmetric dihydroxylation favors oxidation of the more electron-rich alkene (scheme 1).

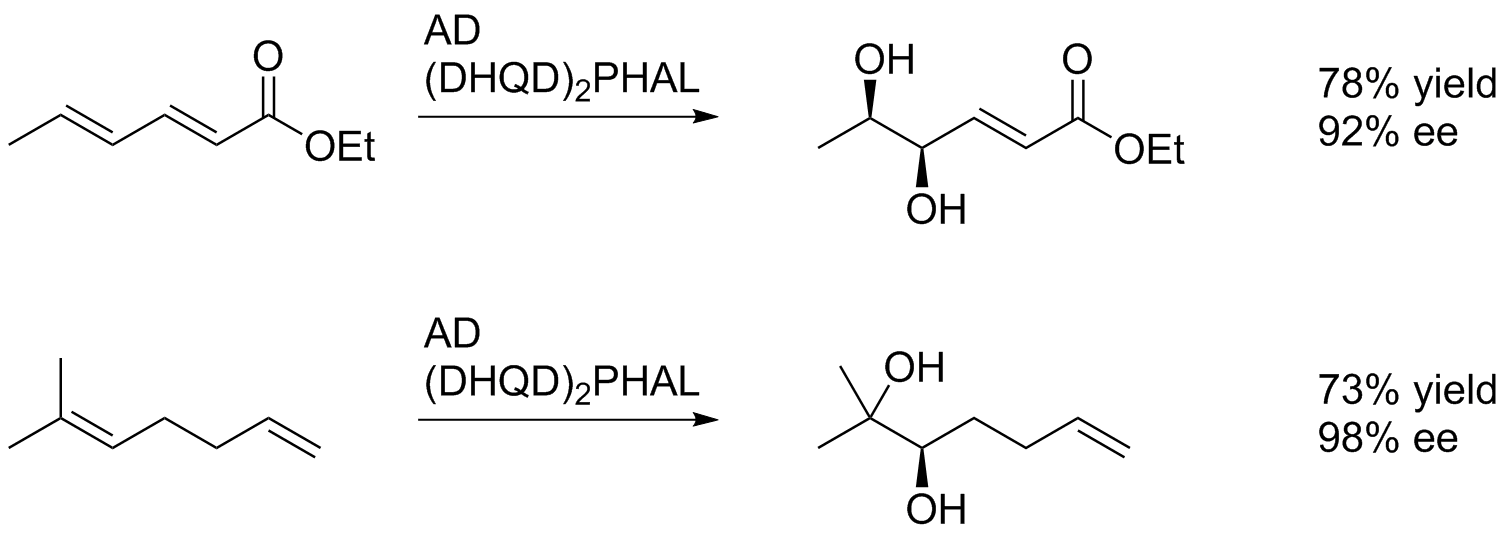
SAD scheme 1

In this example SAD gives the diol of the alkene closest to the (electron-withdrawing) para-methoxybenzoyl group, albeit in low yield. This is likely due to the ability of the aryl ring to interact favorably with the active site of the catalyst via π-stacking. In this manner the aryl substituent can act as a directing group.

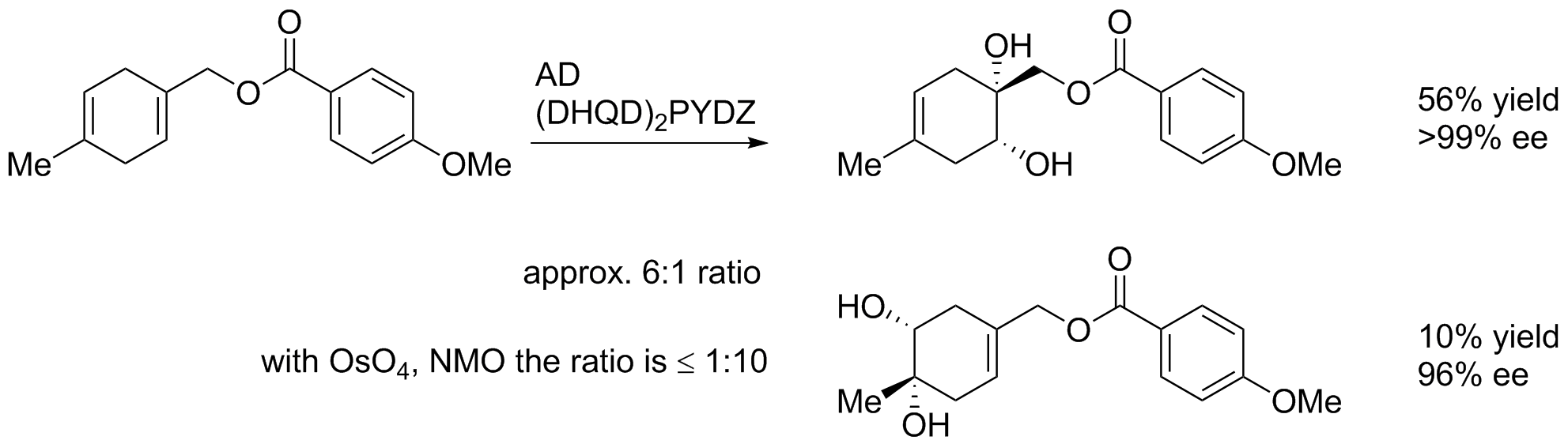
SAD scheme 2

== Stereoselectivity ==
The diastereoselectivity of SAD is set primarily by the choice of ligand (i.e. AD-mix-α versus AD-mix-β), however factors such as pre-existing chirality in the substrate or neighboring functional groups may also play a role. In the example shown below, the para-methoxybenzoyl substituent serves primarily as a source of steric bulk to allow the catalyst to differentiate the two faces of the alkene.

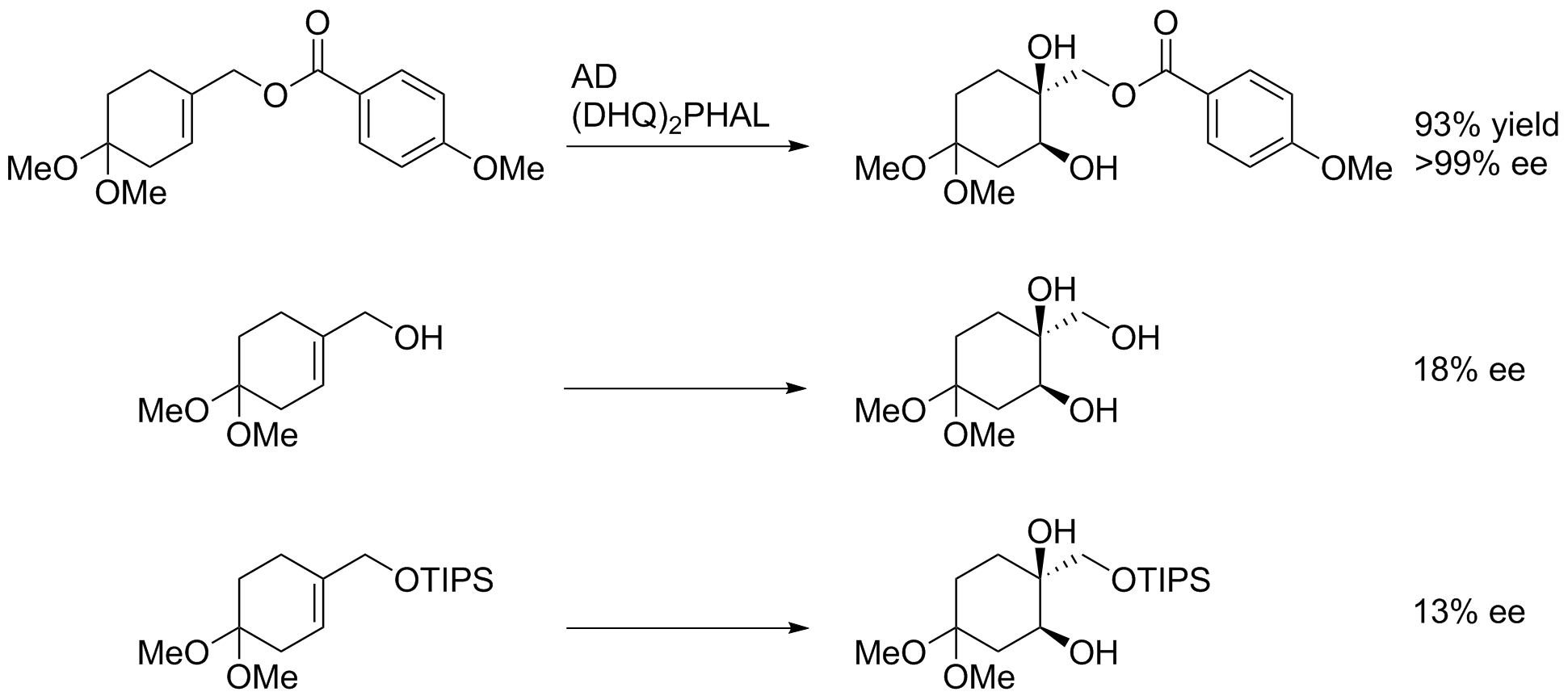
SAD scheme 3

It is often difficult to obtain high diastereoselectivity on cis-disubstituted alkenes when both ends of the olefin have similar steric environments.

== See also ==
- Asymmetric catalytic oxidation
- Milas hydroxylation
- Upjohn dihydroxylation
- Sharpless aminohydroxylation
- Lemieux–Johnson oxidation - olefin to diol, followed by oxidative cleavage to form two aldehydes
