= Sharpless oxyamination =

Chemical reaction

The Sharpless oxyamination (often known as Sharpless aminohydroxylation) is the chemical reaction that converts an alkene to a vicinal amino alcohol. The reaction is related to the Sharpless dihydroxylation, which converts alkenes to vicinal diols. Vicinal amino-alcohols are important products in organic synthesis and recurring pharmacophores in drug discovery.

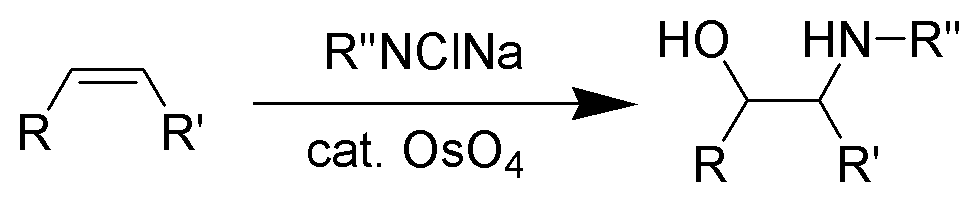
The Sharpless oxyamination

== Mechanism ==
Akin to the dihydroxylation, the oxyamination involves the cycloaddition of the alkene to an imido Os(VIII) intermediate of the type OsO_{3}(NR). Such species are generated by treatment of osmium tetroxide with the sodium chloramines. Typical procedures combine chloramine-T, alkene, an osmium catalyst, and a chiral ligand. Related procedures use benzyl carbamate (CbzNH_{2}), sodium hydroxide, tert-butyl hypochlorite to give CbzNCl(Na).

R_{2}NH + t-BuOCl → R_{2}NCl + t-BuOH
