= Reoxidant =

In chemistry, a reoxidant is a reagent that regenerates a catalyst by oxidation. In some cases they are used stoichiometrically, in other cases only small amounts are required.

== Applications ==
=== OsO_{4}-catalyzed dihydroxylations ===
Reoxidants are commonly used in reactions catalyzed by osmium tetroxide, which is a primary oxidant converting alkenes to glycols. The spent catalyst is an osmium(VI) complex, which reacts with a reoxidant to regenerate Os(VIII). Typical reoxidants for this application include pyridine-N-oxide, ferricyanide/water, and N-methylmorpholine N-oxide.

=== Vanadium(III)-based alkene polymerizations ===
As catalysts for the polymerization of dienes, vanadium complexes are activated with alkylaluminium chlorides, e.g. diethylaluminium chloride. The organoaluminium reagent installs alkyl groups on the V(III) precatalyst. During catalysis or during catalyst activation, some vanadium(III) is reduced to inactive vanadium(II) derivatives. To correct for this reduction, reoxidants such as methyl trichloroacetate are added. The alkyl chloride functions as a source of a chlorine radical, which adds to the inactive V(II) species. In some cases, the reoxidants are called rejuvenators.

=== Oxidations with TEMPO ===
(2,2,6,6-Tetramethylpiperidin-1-yl)oxyl, commonly known as TEMPO, is an expensive but effective oxidant for converting alcohols to carbonyls. With iodine as the reoxidant, TEMPO-H is oxidized back to TEMPO, which then functions catalytically:

oxidation: RCH_{2}OH + 2 TEMPO → RCHO + 2 TEMPO-H
reoxidation: 2 TEMPO-H + I_{2} → 2 TEMPO + 2 HI
