= Cis-1,2-dihydrobenzene-1,2-diol dehydrogenase =

Class of enzymes

cis-1,2-dihydrobenzene-1,2-diol dehydrogenase

Identifiers
- EC no.: 1.3.1.19
- CAS no.: 51923-03-6

Databases
- IntEnz: IntEnz view
- BRENDA: BRENDA entry
- ExPASy: NiceZyme view
- KEGG: KEGG entry
- MetaCyc: metabolic pathway
- PRIAM: profile
- PDB structures: RCSB PDB PDBe PDBsum
- Gene Ontology: AmiGO / QuickGO
Search
- PMC: articles
- PubMed: articles
- NCBI: proteins

In enzymology, cis-1,2-dihydrobenzene-1,2-diol dehydrogenase (EC 1.3.1.19) is an enzyme that catalyzes the chemical reaction

cis-1,2-Dihydrocatechol
+ NADP^{+}
H^{+}
H^{+}
Catechol
+ NADPH

The two substrates of this enzyme are cis-1,2-dihydrocatechol and oxidised nicotinamide adenine dinucleotide (NAD^{+}). Its products are catechol, reduced NADH, and a proton.

This enzyme belongs to the family of oxidoreductases, specifically those acting on the CH-CH group of donor with NAD+ or NADP+ as acceptor. The systematic name of this enzyme class is cis-1,2-dihydrobenzene-1,2-diol:NAD+ oxidoreductase. Other names in common use include cis-benzene glycol dehydrogenase, cis-1,2-dihydrocyclohexa-3,5-diene (nicotinamide adenine, and dinucleotide) oxidoreductase. This enzyme participates in 4 metabolic pathways: gamma-hexachlorocyclohexane degradation, toluene and xylene degradation, naphthalene and anthracene degradation, and styrene degradation.
