= Dihydroquinine =

Names
- IUPAC name (R)-[(2S,4S,5R)-5-ethyl-1-azabicyclo[2.2.2]octan-2-yl]-(6-methoxyquinolin-4-yl)methanol
- Other names (8α,9R)-10,11-Dihydro-6'-methoxycinchonan-9-ol

Identifiers
CAS Number	522-66-7
3D model (JSmol)	Interactive image; Interactive image
ChEBI	CHEBI:135994
ChEMBL	ChEMBL588934
ChemSpider	108426
DrugBank	DB13718
ECHA InfoCard	100.007.578
EC Number	208-334-0
PubChem CID	121515
UNII	31J3Q51T6L
CompTox Dashboard (EPA)	DTXSID70878516
- InChI: InChI=1S/C20H26N2O2/c1-3-13-12-22-9-7-14(13)10-19(22)20(23)16-6-8-21-18-5-4-15(24-2)11-17(16)18/h4-6,8,11,13-14,19-20,23H,3,7,9-10,12H2,1-2H3/t13-,14-,19-,20+/m0/s1 Key: LJOQGZACKSYWCH-WZBLMQSHSA-N; InChI=1/C20H26N2O2/c1-3-13-12-22-9-7-14(13)10-19(22)20(23)16-6-8-21-18-5-4-15(24-2)11-17(16)18/h4-6,8,11,13-14,19-20,23H,3,7,9-10,12H2,1-2H3/t13-,14-,19-,20+/m0/s1 Key: LJOQGZACKSYWCH-WZBLMQSHBC
- SMILES: O[C@@H](C1N2CCC(C(CC)C2)C1)C3=CC=NC4=CC=C(OC)C=C43; O(c4cc1c(nccc1[C@@H](O)[C@H]2N3CC[C@@H](C2)[C@@H](CC)C3)cc4)C

Properties
Chemical formula	C_{20}H_{26}N_{2}O_{2}
Molar mass	326.440 g·mol^{−1}
Melting point	173–175 °C

Hazards
- GHS labelling
Pictograms	(GHS07: Exclamation mark)
Signal word	Warning
Hazard statements	H302, H312, H332
Precautionary statements	P261, P264, P270, P271, P280, P301+P317, P302+P352, P304+P340, P317, P321, P330, P362+P364, P501
- Except where otherwise noted, data are given for materials in their standard state (at 25 °C [77 °F], 100 kPa). verify (what is ?) Infobox references

Dihydroquinine, also known as hydroquinine or DHQ, is an organic compound and as a cinchona alkaloid closely related to quinine. The specific rotation is −148° in ethanol. A derivative of this molecule is used as chiral ligand in the AD-mix for Sharpless dihydroxylation.

DHQ also inhibits growth of the parasite Toxoplasma gondii by inducing mitochondrial membrane damage, but does not disrupt host mitochondrial membrane potential, as well as reactive oxygen species (ROS) generation.

== See also ==
- Dihydroquinidine
