= Dihydroquinidine =

Names
- IUPAC name (S)-[(2R,4S,5R)-5-ethyl-1-azabicyclo[2.2.2]octan-2-yl]-(6-methoxyquinolin-4-yl)methanol
- Other names (9S)-10,11-Dihydro-6'-methoxycinchonan-9-ol

Identifiers
CAS Number	1435-55-8
3D model (JSmol)	Interactive image
ChEMBL	ChEMBL280522
ChemSpider	82624
ECHA InfoCard	100.007.578
PubChem CID	91503
UNII	8P68XPY4HG
- InChI: InChI=1S/C20H26N2O2/c1-3-13-12-22-9-7-14(13)10-19(22)20(23)16-6-8-21-18-5-4-15(24-2)11-17(16)18/h4-6,8,11,13-14,19-20,23H,3,7,9-10,12H2,1-2H3/t13-,14-,19+,20-/m0/s1 Key: LJOQGZACKSYWCH-LHHVKLHASA-N
- SMILES: [C@H](O)(C=1C2=C(C=CC(OC)=C2)N=CC1)[C@@]3([N@@]4C[C@H](CC)[C@H](C3)CC4)[H]

Properties
Chemical formula	C_{20}H_{26}N_{2}O_{2}
Molar mass	326.440 g·mol^{−1}
Melting point	169 to 172 °C (336 to 342 °F; 442 to 445 K)

Pharmacology
ATC code	C01BA13 (WHO)
- Except where otherwise noted, data are given for materials in their standard state (at 25 °C [77 °F], 100 kPa). verify (what is ?) Infobox references

Dihydroquinidine (also called hydroquinidine) is an organic compound, a cinchona alkaloid closely related to quinine. The specific rotation is +226° in ethanol at 2 g/100 ml. A derivative of this molecule is used as chiral ligand in the AD-mix for Sharpless dihydroxylation.

The substance is also a class Ia antiarrhythmic medication.

== See also ==
- Dihydroquinine
