= Ruthenium tetroxide =

Ruthenium(VIII) oxide

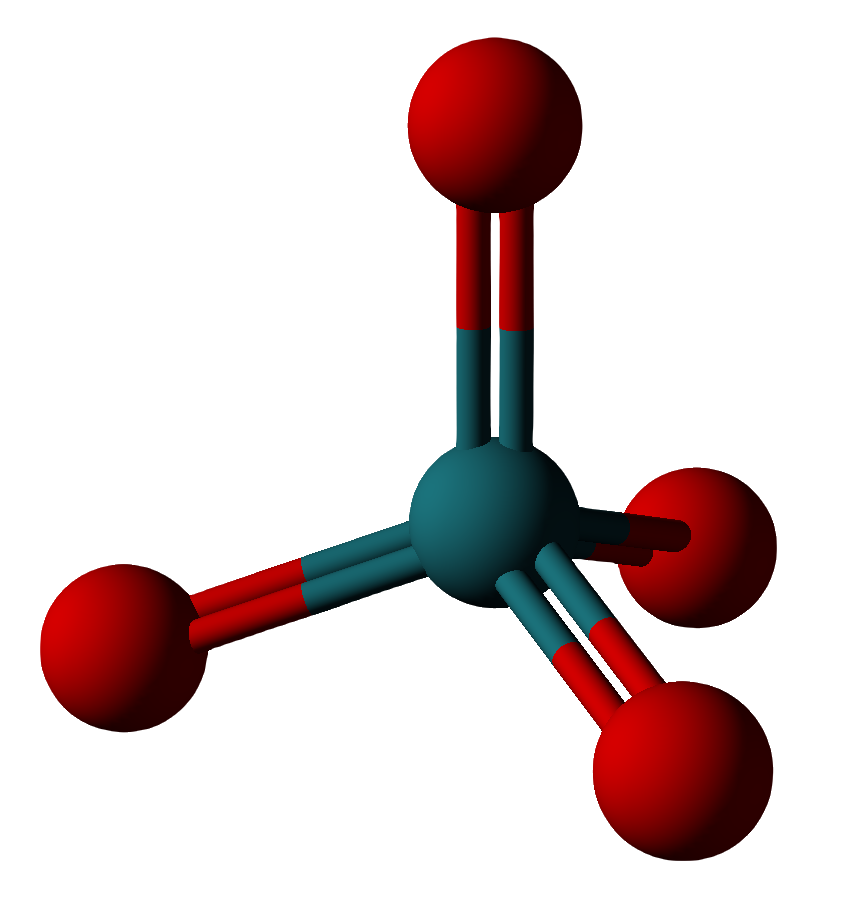

Names
- IUPAC name Ruthenium(VIII) oxide

Identifiers
CAS Number	20427-56-9
3D model (JSmol)	Interactive image
ChemSpider	106401
ECHA InfoCard	100.039.815
EC Number	243-813-8
PubChem CID	119079
UNII	97E960G9RP
CompTox Dashboard (EPA)	DTXSID20174373
- InChI: InChI=1S/4O.Ru Key: GJFMDWMEOCWXGJ-UHFFFAOYSA-N
- SMILES: O=[Ru](=O)(=O)=O

Properties
Chemical formula	RuO_{4}
Molar mass	165.07 g/mol
Appearance	yellow easily melting solid
Odor	pungent ozone like
Density	3.29 g/cm^{3}
Melting point	25.5 °C (77.9 °F; 298.6 K)
Boiling point	129.6 °C (265.3 °F; 402.8 K)
Solubility in water	2% w/v at 20 °C
Solubility in other solvents	Soluble in Carbon tetrachloride Chloroform

Structure
Molecular shape	tetrahedral
Dipole moment	zero

Hazards
- GHS labelling
Pictograms	(GHS03: Oxidizing) (GHS07: Exclamation mark)
Signal word	Danger
Hazard statements	H271, H319
Precautionary statements	P210, P220, P264+P265, P280, P283, P305+P351+P338, P306+P360, P337+P317, P370+P378, P371+P380+P375, P420, P501
NFPA 704 (fire diamond)	3 0 1

Related compounds
Related compounds	Ruthenium dioxide Ruthenium trichloride Osmium tetroxide
- Except where otherwise noted, data are given for materials in their standard state (at 25 °C [77 °F], 100 kPa). verify (what is ?) Infobox references

Ruthenium tetroxide is the inorganic compound with the formula RuO_{4}. It is a yellow volatile solid that melts near room temperature. It has the odor of ozone. Samples are typically black due to impurities. The analogous OsO_{4} is more widely used and better known. One of the few solvents in which RuO_{4} forms stable solutions is CCl_{4}.

== Preparation ==
RuO_{4} is prepared by oxidation of ruthenium(III) chloride with NaIO_{4}. The reaction initially produces sodium diperiododihydroxoruthenate(VI), which then decomposes in acid solution to the tetroxide:

2 Ru^{3+}(aq) + 5 IO_{4}^{−}(aq) + 3 H_{2}O(l) → 2 RuO_{4}(s) + 5 IO_{3}^{−}(aq) + 6 H^{+}(aq)

Due to its challenging reactivity, RuO_{4} is always generated in situ and used in catalytic quantities, at least in organic reactions.

== Structure ==
RuO_{4} forms two crystal structures, one with cubic symmetry and another with monoclinic symmetry, isotypic to OsO_{4}. The molecule adopts a tetrahedral geometry, with the Ru–O distances ranging from 169 to 170 pm.

== Uses ==
=== Isolation of ruthenium from ores ===
The main commercial value of RuO_{4} is as an intermediate in the production of ruthenium compounds and metal from ores. Like other platinum group metals (PGMs), ruthenium occurs at low concentrations and often mixed with other PGMs. Together with OsO_{4}, it is separated from other PGMs by distillation of a chlorine-oxidized extract. Ruthenium is separated from OsO_{4} by reducing RuO_{4} with hydrochloric acid, a process that exploits the highly positive reduction potential for the [RuO_{4}]^{0/-} couple.

=== Organic chemistry ===
RuO_{4} is of specialized value in organic chemistry because it oxidizes virtually any hydrocarbon. For example, it will oxidize adamantane to 1-adamantanol. Because it is such an aggressive oxidant, reaction conditions must be mild, generally room temperature. Although a strong oxidant, RuO_{4} oxidations do not perturb stereocenters that are not oxidized. Illustrative is the oxidation of the following diol to a carboxylic acid:

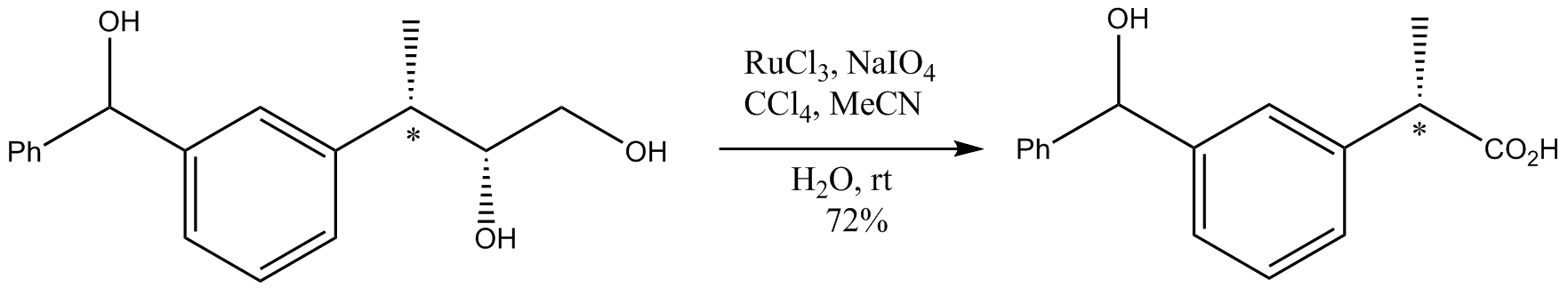

Oxidation of epoxy alcohols also occurs without degradation of the epoxide ring:

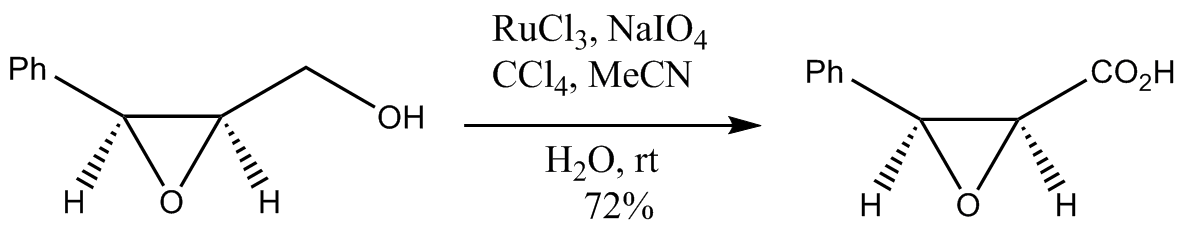

Under milder conditions, oxidative reaction yields aldehydes instead. RuO_{4} readily converts secondary alcohols into ketones. Although similar results can be achieved with other cheaper oxidants such as PCC- or DMSO-based oxidants, RuO_{4} is ideal when a very vigorous oxidant is needed, but mild conditions must be maintained. It is used in organic synthesis to oxidize internal alkynes to 1,2-diketones, and terminal alkynes along with primary alcohols to carboxylic acids. When used in this fashion, the ruthenium(VIII) oxide is used in catalytic amounts and regenerated by the addition of sodium periodate to ruthenium(III) chloride and a solvent mixture of acetonitrile, water and carbon tetrachloride. RuO_{4} readily cleaves double bonds to yield carbonyl products, in a manner similar to ozonolysis. OsO_{4}, a more familiar oxidant that is structurally similar to RuO_{4}, does not cleave double bonds, instead producing vicinal diol products. However, with short reaction times and carefully controlled conditions, RuO_{4} can also be used for dihydroxylation.

Because RuO_{4} degrades the "double bonds" of arenes (especially electron-rich ones) by dihydroxylation and cleavage of the C-C bond in a way few other reagents can, it is useful as a "deprotection" reagent for carboxylic acids that are masked as aryl groups (typically phenyl or p-methoxyphenyl). Because the fragments formed are themselves readily oxidizable by RuO_{4}, a substantial fraction of the arene carbon atoms undergo exhaustive oxidation to form carbon dioxide. Consequently, multiple equivalents of the terminal oxidant (often in excess of 10 equivalents per aryl ring) are required to achieve complete conversion to the carboxylic acid, limiting the practicality of the transformation.

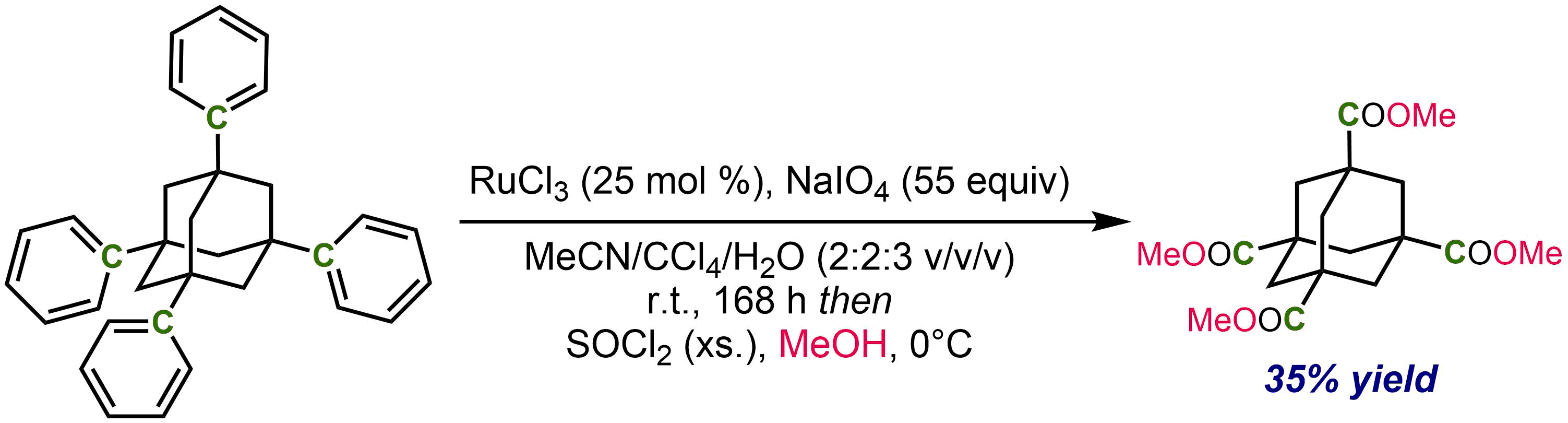

Although used as a direct oxidant, due to the relatively high cost of RuO_{4} it is also used catalytically with a cooxidant. For an oxidation of cyclic alcohols with RuO_{4} as a catalyst and bromate as oxidant under basic conditions, RuO_{4} is first activated by hydroxide, turning into the hyperruthenate anion:

RuO_{4} + OH^{−} → HRuO_{5}^{−}

The reaction proceeds via a glycolate complex.

=== Other uses ===
Ruthenium tetroxide is a potential staining agent. It is used to expose latent fingerprints by turning to the brown/black ruthenium dioxide when in contact with fatty oils or fats contained in sebaceous contaminants of the print.

== Gaseous release by nuclear accidents ==
Because of the very high volatility of ruthenium tetroxide (RuO_{4}) ruthenium radioactive isotopes with their relative short half-life are considered as the second most hazardous gaseous isotopes after iodine-131 in case of release by a nuclear accident. The two most important radioactive isotopes of ruthenium are ^{103}Ru and ^{106}Ru. They have half-lives of 39.6 days and 373.6 days, respectively.
