= Benzene 1,2-dioxygenase =

Class of enzymes

benzene 1,2-dioxygenase

Identifiers
- EC no.: 1.14.12.3
- CAS no.: 9075-66-5

Databases
- BRENDA: enzyme data
- ExPASy: NiceZyme view
- KEGG: enzyme entry
- MetaCyc: metabolic pathway
- Rhea: reactions
- PDB structures: RCSB PDB PDBe PDBsum
- Gene Ontology: AmiGO / QuickGO
Search
- PMC: articles
- PubMed: articles
- NCBI: proteins

In enzymology, a benzene 1,2-dioxygenase (EC 1.14.12.3) is an enzyme that catalyzes the chemical reaction

benzene + NADH + H^{+} + O_{2} $\rightleftharpoons$ cis-cyclohexa-3,5-diene-1,2-diol + NAD^{+}

The four substrates of this enzyme are benzene, NADH, H^{+}, and O_{2}, whereas its two products are cis-1,2-dihydrocatechol and NAD^{+}.

== Classification ==
This enzyme belongs to the family of oxidoreductases, specifically those acting on paired donors, with O2 as oxidant and incorporation or reduction of oxygen. The oxygen incorporated need not be derived from O2 with NADH or NADPH as one donor, and incorporation of two atoms of oxygen into the other donor.

== Nomenclature ==
The systematic name of this enzyme class is benzene,NADH:oxygen oxidoreductase (1,2-hydroxylating). Other names in common use include benzene hydroxylase, and benzene dioxygenase.

== Biological role ==
This enzyme participates in naphthalene and anthracene degradation. It has 4 cofactors: FAD, Iron, Sulfur, and Iron-sulfur.
