= Cis-1,2-Dihydrocatechol =

cis-1,2-Dihydrocatechol

Names
- IUPAC name 3,5-Cyclohexadiene-1,2-diol

Identifiers
| CAS Number | 17793-95-2 |
| 3D model (JSmol) | Interactive image |
| ChEBI | CHEBI:16190 |
| ChemSpider | 154113 |
| Gmelin Reference | 200913 |
| KEGG | C04091 |
| PubChem CID | 176951 |
| CompTox Dashboard (EPA) | DTXSID70880013 |
- InChI: InChI=1S/C6H8O2/c7-5-3-1-2-4-6(5)8/h1-8H/t5-,6+ Key: YDRSQRPHLBEPTP-OLQVQODUSA-N
- SMILES: C1=C[C@H]([C@H](C=C1)O)O

Properties
| Chemical formula | C_{6}H_{8}O_{2} |
| Molar mass | 112.128 g·mol^{−1} |
| Appearance | white oily solid |
| Melting point | 28 °C (82 °F; 301 K) |
- Except where otherwise noted, data are given for materials in their standard state (at 25 °C [77 °F], 100 kPa). Infobox references

cis-1,2-Dihydrocatechol is the organic compound with the formula C_{6}H_{6}(OH)_{2}. Several isomers exist with this formula. It is a colorless solid melting near room temperature. The compound is classified as a 1,3-cyclohexadiene. It arises by the dihydroxylation of benzene catalyzed by toluene dioxygenase. It can also be prepared from catechol using the enzyme cis-1,2-dihydrobenzene-1,2-diol dehydrogenase:

Catechol
+ NADPH
H^{+}
H^{+}
cis-1,2-Dihydrocatechol
+ NADP^{+}

cis-1,2-Dihydrocatechol has been used in the synthesis, sometimes on a commercial scale, of indinavir, indigo, and poly(p-phenylene).
