= Upjohn dihydroxylation =

Chemical reaction

Named after	The Upjohn Company
Reaction type	Addition reaction

Identifiers
Organic Chemistry Portal	upjohn-dihydroxylation

The Upjohn dihydroxylation is an organic reaction which converts an alkene to a cis vicinal diol. It was developed by V. VanRheenen, R. C. Kelly and D. Y. Cha of the Upjohn Company in 1976. It is a catalytic system using N-methylmorpholine N-oxide (NMO) as stoichiometric re-oxidant for the osmium tetroxide. It is superior to previous catalytic methods.

Prior to this method, use of stoichiometric amounts of the toxic and expensive reagent osmium tetroxide was often necessary. The Upjohn dihydroxylation is still often used for the formation of cis-vicinal diols; however, it can be slow and is prone to ketone byproduct formation. One of the peculiarities of the dihydroxylation of olefins is that the standard "racemic" method (the Upjohn dihydroxylation) is slower and often lower yielding than the asymmetric method (the Sharpless asymmetric dihydroxylation).

== Improvements to Upjohn dihydroxylation ==
In response to these problems, Stuart Warren and co-workers employed similar reaction conditions to the Sharpless asymmetric dihydroxylation, but replacing the chiral ligands with the achiral quinuclidine to give a racemic reaction product (assuming an achiral starting material is employed). This approach takes advantage of the fact that when using the Sharpless alkaloid ligands, the dihydroxylation of alkenes is faster and higher yielding than in their absence. This phenomenon became known as "ligand accelerated catalysis", a term coined by Barry Sharpless during the development of his asymmetric protocol.

== See also ==
- Milas hydroxylation
- Sharpless asymmetric dihydroxylation
