= N-Methylmorpholine N-oxide =

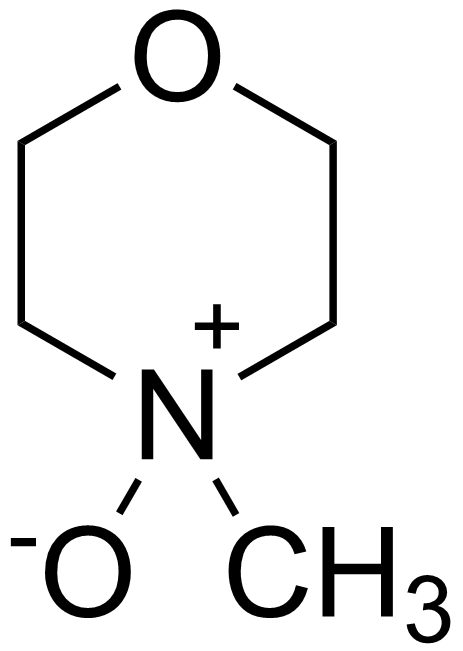

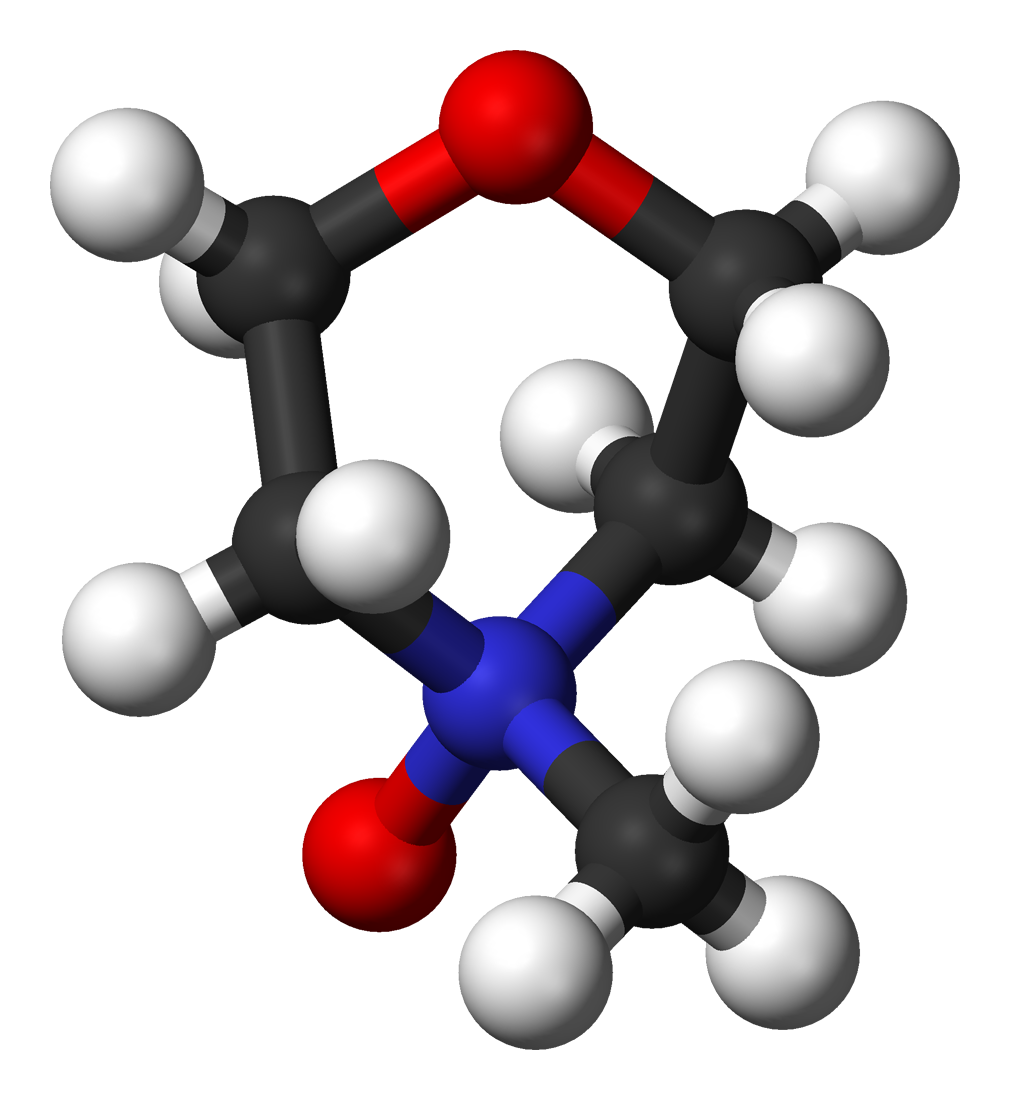

Identifiers
CAS Number	7529-22-8
3D model (JSmol)	Interactive image
ChEBI	CHEBI:52093
ChemSpider	74032
ECHA InfoCard	100.028.538
PubChem CID	82029
UNII	ARC64PKJ0F
CompTox Dashboard (EPA)	DTXSID3029287
- InChI: InChI=1S/C5H11NO2/c1-6(7)2-4-8-5-3-6/h2-5H2,1H3 Key: LFTLOKWAGJYHHR-UHFFFAOYSA-N; InChI=1/C5H11NO2/c1-6(7)2-4-8-5-3-6/h2-5H2,1H3 Key: LFTLOKWAGJYHHR-UHFFFAOYAV
- SMILES: C[N+]1(CCOCC1)[O-]

Properties
Chemical formula	C_{5}H_{11}NO_{2}
Molar mass	117.15 g/mol
Melting point	180 to 184 °C (356 to 363 °F; 453 to 457 K)
- Except where otherwise noted, data are given for materials in their standard state (at 25 °C [77 °F], 100 kPa). verify (what is ?) Infobox references

N-Methylmorpholine N-oxide (more correctly 4-methylmorpholine 4-oxide), NMO or NMMO is an organic compound. This heterocyclic amine oxide and morpholine derivative is used in organic chemistry as a co-oxidant and sacrificial catalyst in oxidation reactions for instance in osmium tetroxide oxidations and the Sharpless asymmetric dihydroxylation or oxidations with TPAP. NMO is commercially supplied both as a monohydrate C_{5}H_{11}NO_{2}·H_{2}O and as the anhydrous compound. The monohydrate is used as a solvent for cellulose in the lyocell process to produce cellulose fibers.

== Uses ==
=== Solvent of cellulose ===
NMMO monohydrate is used as a solvent in the lyocell process to produce lyocell fiber. It dissolves cellulose to form a solution called dope, and the cellulose is reprecipitated in a water bath to produce a fiber. The process is similar but not analogous to the viscose process. In the viscose process, cellulose is made soluble by conversion to its xanthate derivatives. With NMMO, cellulose is not derivatized but dissolves to give a homogeneous polymer solution. The resulting fiber is similar to viscose; this was observed, for example, for Valonia cellulose microfibrils. Dilution with water causes the cellulose to reprecipitate, i.e. the solvation of cellulose with NMMO is a water sensitive process.

Cellulose remains insoluble in most solvents because it has a strong and highly structured intermolecular hydrogen bonding network, which resists common solvents. NMMO breaks the hydrogen bonding network that keeps cellulose insoluble in water and other solvents. Similar solubility has been obtained in a few solvents, particularly a mix of lithium chloride in dimethyl acetamide and some hydrophilic ionic liquids.

=== Dissolution of scleroproteins ===
Another use of NMMO is in the dissolution of scleroprotein (found in animal tissue). This dissolution occurs in the crystal areas which are more homogeneous and contain glycine and alanine residues with a small number of other residues. How NMMO dissolves these proteins is scarcely studied. Other studies, however, have been done in similar amide systems (i.e. hexapeptide). The hydrogen bonds of the amides can be broken by NMMO.

== Oxidant ==
Oxidation of an alkene with osmium tetroxide (0.06 eq.) and NMO (1.2 eq.)in acetone/water 5:1 RT 12 hrs.

NMO, as an N-oxide, is an oxidant in the Upjohn dihydroxylation. It is generally used in stoichiometric amounts as a secondary oxidant (a cooxidant) to regenerate a primary (catalytic) oxidant after the latter has been reduced by the substrate. Vicinal syn-dihydroxylation reactions for example, would, in theory, require stoichiometric amounts of toxic, volatile and expensive osmium tetroxide, but if continuously regenerated with NMO, the amount required can be reduced to catalytic quantities.
