= Milas hydroxylation =

Named after	Nicholas Milas
Reaction type	Addition reaction

The Milas hydroxylation is an organic reaction converting an alkene to a vicinal diol, and was developed by Nicholas A. Milas in the 1930s. The cis-diol is formed by reaction of alkenes with hydrogen peroxide and either ultraviolet light or a catalytic osmium tetroxide, vanadium pentoxide, or chromium trioxide.

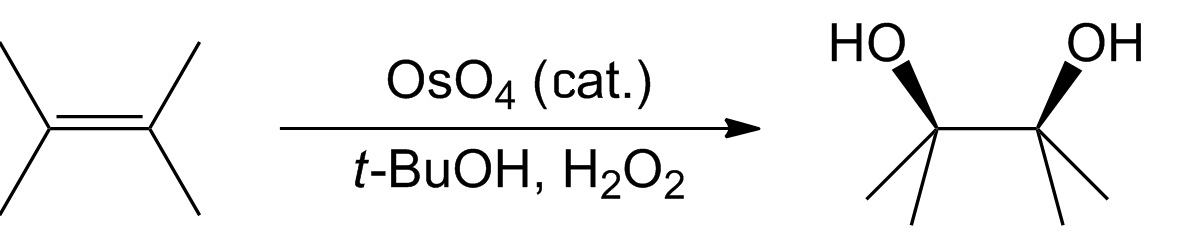

The reaction has been superseded in synthetic chemistry by the Upjohn dihydroxylation and later by the Sharpless asymmetric dihydroxylation.

== Mechanism ==
The proposed mechanism for the Milas hydroxylation involves the initial combination of hydrogen peroxide and the osmium tetroxide catalyst to form an intermediate, which then adds to the alkene, followed by a cleavage that forms the product and regenerates the OsO_{4}.

== Limitations ==
One variation of the Milas hydroxylation (shown in the mechanism above) requires stoichiometric amounts of osmium tetroxide, which is toxic (highly volatile) and expensive. Furthermore, in Milas's own experiments his yields ranged from 37.6% to 60.2% for the cis-vicinal diol. Note that a vicinal diol is a molecule in which two hydroxy atoms are located on adjacent carbon atoms. Vicinal diols can be oxidized to aldehydes and ketones, rendering their synthesis useful.

The catalyst, osmium tetroxide, also known as Merck osmic acid, dissolves readily in tertiary butyl alcohol which implies that the solution in which the reaction occurs is stable, unless isobutylene is already present. In the presence of isobutylene most of the osmium tetroxide is reduced to an insoluble black colloidal oxide. This colloidal oxide is a very active catalyst in decomposition of hydrogen peroxide. Thus, in aqueous solutions osmium tetroxide decomposes hydrogen peroxide, whereas an anhydrous tertiary butyl alcohol decomposes at a much slower rate.

The Upjohn dihydroxylation and the Sharpless asymmetric dihydroxylation both result in cis-vicinal diols as well, and do not require the toxic, expensive catalyst.

== Applications ==
In 1949, the Milas hydroxylation was applied to a study of the demethylation of N-dimethyl-p-amino-azobenzene, otherwise known as butter yellow. Hydrogen peroxide in tertiary butyl alcohol with osmium tetroxide as a catalyst (Milas reagents) was examined to determine the parallels of the reaction with butter yellow in vivo versus in vitro. Previously it was discovered that the hydroxylation of butter yellow or its demethylated derivatives exist within rats, and thus rats were deemed suitable for the comparison. Absorption spectra were examined to confirm the results of the experiment, which found that the product of the Milas hydroxylation was one of the obtained products.
