= Osmium tetroxide =

Chemical compound

Stick model osmium tetroxide
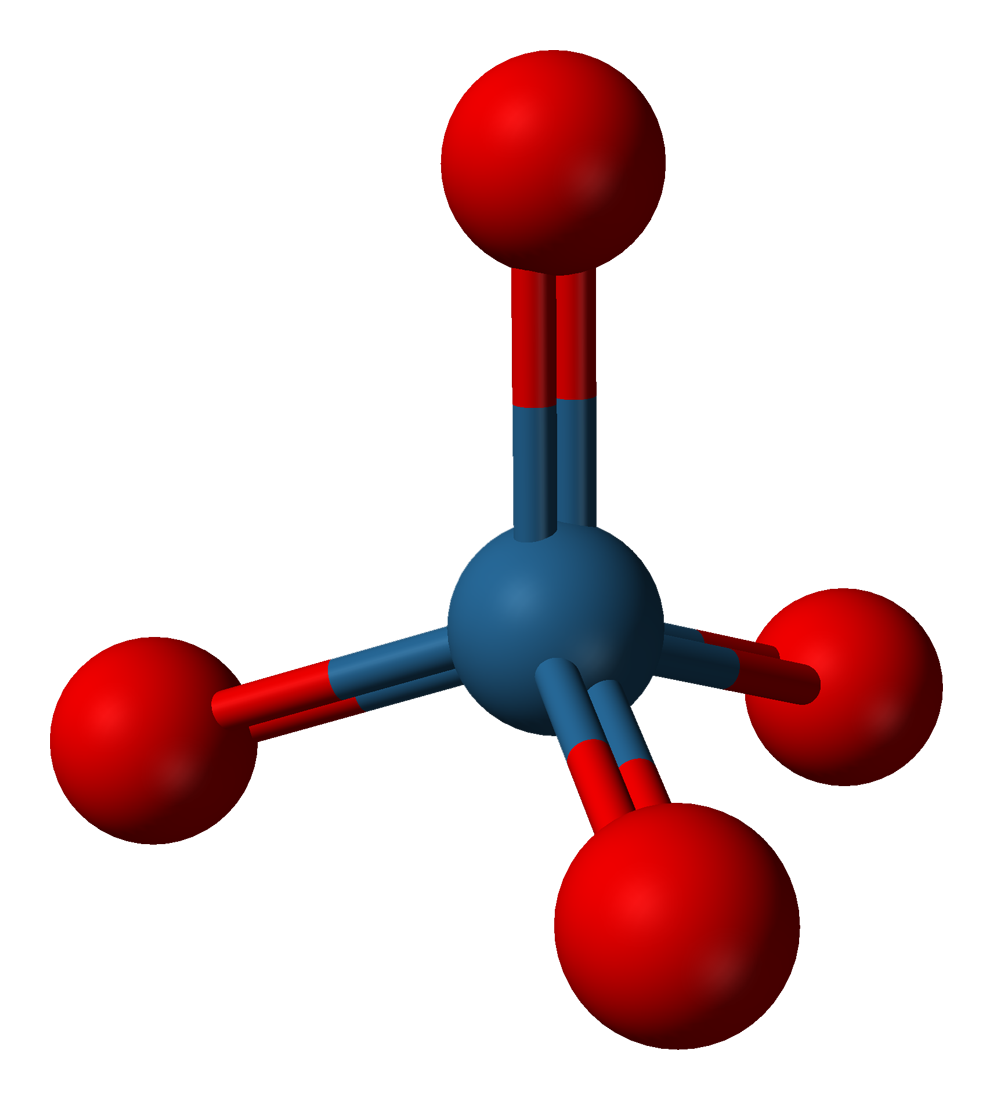
Ball and stick model of osmium tetroxide
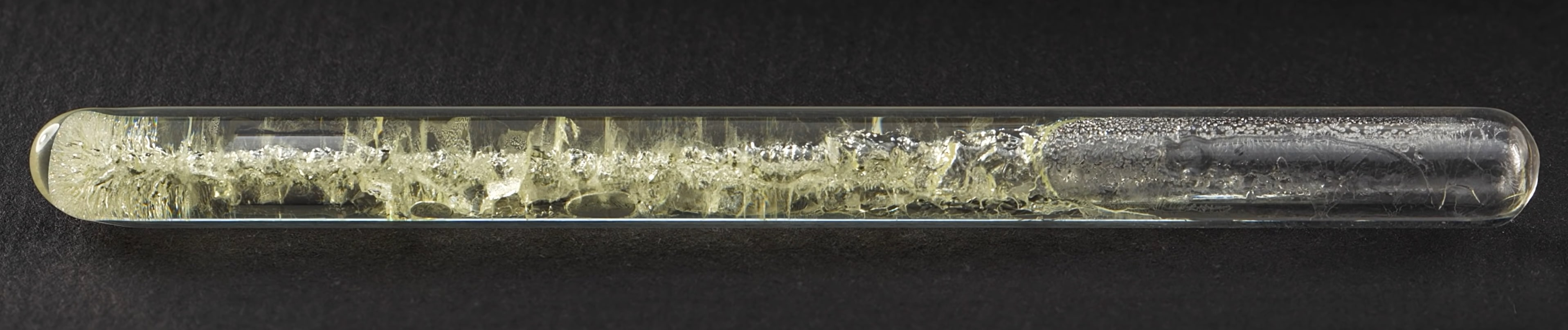

Names
- Preferred IUPAC name Osmium tetraoxide
- Systematic IUPAC name Tetraoxoosmium
- Other names Osmium(VIII) oxide

Identifiers
CAS Number	20816-12-0
3D model (JSmol)	Interactive image
ChEBI	CHEBI:88215
ChemSpider	28158
ECHA InfoCard	100.040.038
EC Number	244-058-7
MeSH	Osmium+tetroxide
PubChem CID	30318
RTECS number	RN1140000
UNII	P40W033BGM
UN number	UN 2471
CompTox Dashboard (EPA)	DTXSID5042245
- InChI: InChI=1S/4O.Os Key: VUVGYHUDAICLFK-UHFFFAOYSA-N; InChI=1S/4O.Os Key: VUVGYHUDAICLFK-UHFFFAOYSA-N; InChI=1/4O.Os/rO4Os/c1-5(2,3)4 Key: VUVGYHUDAICLFK-TYHKRQCIAE
- SMILES: O=[Os](=O)(=O)=O

Properties
Chemical formula	OsO_{4}
Molar mass	254.23 g/mol
Appearance	White volatile solid
Odor	Acrid, chlorine-like
Density	4.9 g/cm^{3}
Melting point	40.25 °C (104.45 °F; 313.40 K)
Boiling point	129.7 °C (265.5 °F; 402.8 K)
Solubility in water	5.70 g/100 mL (10 °C); 6.23 g/100 mL (25 °C)
Solubility	Soluble in most organic solvents, ammonium hydroxide, phosphorus oxychloride
Solubility in CCl_{4}	375 g/100 mL
Vapor pressure	7 mmHg (20 °C)

Structure
Crystal structure	Monoclinic, mS20
Space group	C2/c
Lattice constant	a = 9.379 Å, b = 4.515 Å, c = 8.630 Å α = 90°, β = 116.58°, γ = 90°
Lattice volume (V)	326.8 Å^{3}
Formula units (Z)	4
Molecular shape	tetrahedral

Hazards
- GHS labelling
Pictograms	(GHS05: Corrosive) (GHS06: Toxic)
Signal word	Danger
Hazard statements	H300, H310, H314, H330
Precautionary statements	P260, P262, P264, P270, P271, P280, P284, P301+P310, P301+P330+P331, P302+P350, P303+P361+P353, P304+P340, P305+P351+P338, P310, P320, P321, P330, P361, P363, P403+P233, P405, P501
NFPA 704 (fire diamond)	3 0 1 OX
- Lethal dose or concentration (LD, LC)
LC_{Lo} (lowest published)	1316 mg/m^{3} (rabbit, 30 min); 423 mg/m^{3} (rat, 4 hr); 423 mg/m^{3} (mouse, 4 hr)
- NIOSH (US health exposure limits)
PEL (Permissible)	TWA 0.002 mg/m^{3}
REL (Recommended)	TWA 0.002 mg/m^{3} (0.0002 ppm) ST 0.006 mg/m^{3} (0.0006 ppm)
IDLH (Immediate danger)	1 mg/m^{3}
Safety data sheet (SDS)	ICSC 0528

Related compounds
Other cations	Ruthenium tetroxide Hassium tetroxide
Related osmium oxides	Osmium(IV) oxide
- Except where otherwise noted, data are given for materials in their standard state (at 25 °C [77 °F], 100 kPa). verify (what is ?) Infobox references

Osmium tetroxide (also osmium(VIII) oxide) is the chemical compound with the formula OsO_{4}. The compound is noteworthy for its many uses, despite its toxicity and the rarity of osmium. It also has a number of unusual properties, one being that the solid is volatile. The compound is colourless, but most samples appear yellow. This is most likely due to the presence of the impurity osmium dioxide (OsO_{2}), which is yellow-brown in colour. In biology, its property of binding to lipids has made it a widely used stain in electron microscopy.

== Physical properties ==
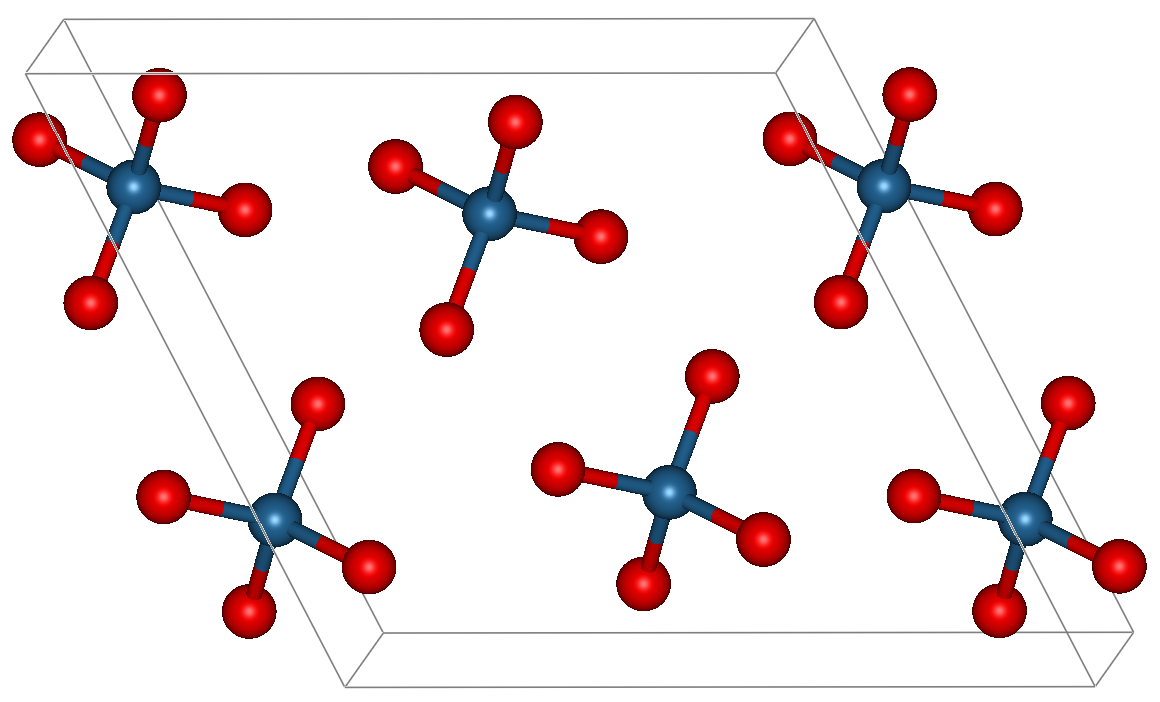
Crystal structure of OsO_{4}

Osmium(VIII) oxide forms monoclinic crystals. It has a characteristic acrid chlorine-like odor. The element name osmium is derived from osme, Greek for odor. OsO_{4} is volatile: it sublimes at room temperature. It is soluble in a wide range of organic solvents. It is moderately soluble in water, with which it reacts reversibly to form osmic acid (see below). Pure osmium(VIII) oxide is probably colourless; it has been suggested that its yellow hue is attributable due to osmium dioxide (OsO_{2}) impurities. The osmium tetroxide molecule is tetrahedral and therefore nonpolar. This nonpolarity helps OsO_{4} penetrate charged cell membranes.

Melting and crystallization of osmium tetroxide

== Structure and electron configuration ==
The osmium of OsO_{4} has an oxidation number of VIII; however, the metal does not possess a corresponding 8+ charge as the bonding in the compound is largely covalent in character (the ionization energy required to produce a formal 8+ charge also far exceeds the energies available in normal chemical reactions). The osmium atom exhibits double bonds to the four oxide ligands, resulting in a 16 electron complex. OsO_{4} is isoelectronic with permanganate and chromate ions.

== Synthesis ==
OsO_{4} is formed slowly when osmium powder reacts with O_{2} at ambient temperature. Reaction of bulk solid requires heating to 400 °C.

Os + 2 O_{2} → OsO_{4}

== Reactions ==
=== Oxidation of alkenes ===
Alkenes add to OsO_{4} to give diolate species that hydrolyze to cis-diols. The net process is called dihydroxylation. This proceeds via a [3 + 2] cycloaddition reaction between the OsO_{4} and alkene to form an intermediate osmate ester that rapidly hydrolyses to yield the vicinal diol. As the oxygen atoms are added in a concerted step, the resulting stereochemistry is cis.

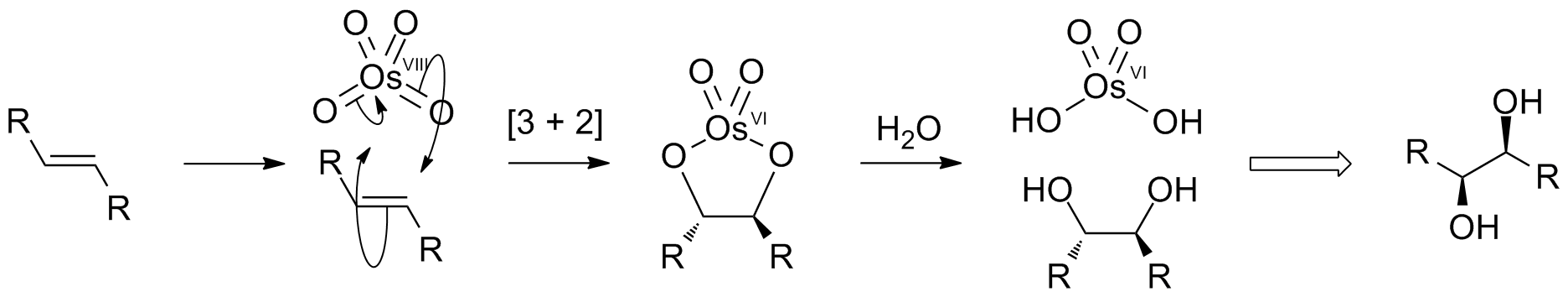
Idealized depiction of the cis-dihydroxylation of alkenes.

OsO_{4} is expensive and highly toxic, making it an unappealing reagent to use in stoichiometric amounts. However, its reactions are made catalytic by adding reoxidants to reoxidise the Os(VI) by-product back to Os(VIII). Typical reagents include H_{2}O_{2} (Milas hydroxylation), N-methylmorpholine N-oxide (Upjohn dihydroxylation) and K_{3}Fe(CN)_{6}/water. These reoxidants do not react with the alkenes on their own. Other osmium compounds can be used as catalysts, including osmate(VI) salts ([OsO_{2}(OH)_{4})]^{2−}, and osmium trichloride hydrate (OsCl_{3}·xH_{2}O). These species oxidise to osmium(VIII) in the presence of such oxidants.

Lewis bases such as tertiary amines and pyridines increase the rate of dihydroxylation. This "ligand-acceleration" arises via the formation of adduct OsO_{4}L, which adds more rapidly to the alkene. If the amine is chiral, then the dihydroxylation can proceed with enantioselectivity (see Sharpless asymmetric dihydroxylation). OsO_{4} does not react with most carbohydrates.

The process can be extended to give two aldehydes in the Lemieux–Johnson oxidation, which uses periodate to achieve diol cleavage and to regenerate the catalytic loading of OsO_{4}. This process is equivalent to that of ozonolysis.

=== Coordination chemistry ===
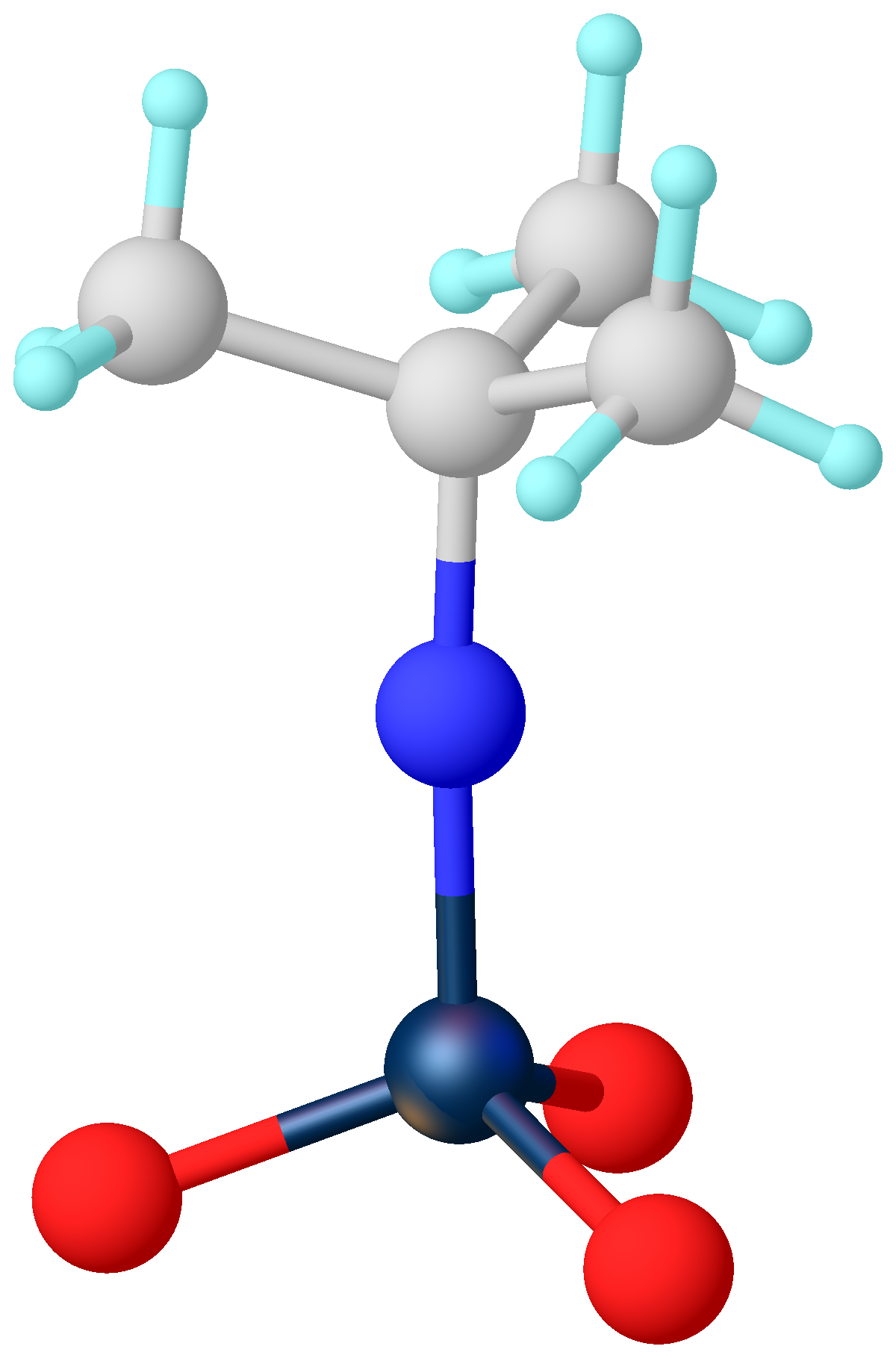
Structure of OsO_{3}(N-t-Bu) (multiple bonds are not drawn explicitly), illustrating the type of osmium(VIII)-oxo-imide that adds alkenes en route to the amino alcohol.

OsO_{4} is a Lewis acid and a mild oxidant. It reacts with alkaline aqueous solution to give the perosmate anion OsO_{4}(OH)^{2−}_{2}. This species is easily reduced to osmate anion, OsO_{2}(OH)^{2−}_{4}.

When the Lewis base is an amine, adducts are also formed. Thus OsO_{4} can be stored in the form of osmeth, in which OsO_{4} is complexed with hexamine. Osmeth can be dissolved in tetrahydrofuran (THF) and diluted in an aqueous buffer solution to make a dilute (0.25%) working solution of OsO_{4}.

With tert-BuNH_{2}, the imido derivative is produced:

OsO_{4} + Me_{3}CNH_{2} → OsO_{3}(NCMe_{3}) + H_{2}O

Similarly, with NH_{3} one obtains the nitrido complex:

OsO_{4} + NH_{3} + KOH → K[OsO_{3}N] + 2 H_{2}O

The [OsO_{3}N]^{−} anion is isoelectronic and isostructural with OsO_{4}.

OsO_{4} is very soluble in tert-butyl alcohol. In solution, it is readily reduced by hydrogen to osmium metal. The suspended osmium metal can be used to catalytically hydrogenate a wide variety of organic chemicals containing double or triple bonds.

OsO_{4} + 4 H_{2} → Os + 4 H_{2}O

OsO_{4} undergoes reductive carbonylation with carbon monoxide in methanol at 400 K and 200 bar to produce the triangular cluster Os_{3}(CO)_{12}:

3 OsO_{4} + 24 CO → Os_{3}(CO)_{12} + 12 CO_{2}

==== Oxofluorides ====
Osmium forms several oxofluorides, all of which are very sensitive to moisture. Purple cis-OsO_{2}F_{4} forms at 77 K in an anhydrous HF solution:

OsO_{4} + 2 KrF_{2} → cis-OsO_{2}F_{4} + 2 Kr + O_{2}

OsO_{4} also reacts with F_{2} to form yellow OsO_{3}F_{2}:

2 OsO_{4} + 2 F_{2} → 2 OsO_{3}F_{2} + O_{2}

OsO_{4} reacts with one equivalent of [Me_{4}N]F at 298 K and 2 equivalents at 253 K:

OsO_{4} + [Me_{4}N]F → [Me_{4}N][OsO_{4}F]

OsO_{4} + 2 [Me_{4}N]F → [Me_{4}N]_{2}[cis-OsO_{4}F_{2}]

== Uses ==
=== Organic synthesis ===
In organic synthesis OsO_{4} is widely used to oxidize alkenes to the vicinal diols, adding two hydroxyl groups at the same side (syn addition). See reaction and mechanism above. This reaction has been made both catalytic (Upjohn dihydroxylation) and asymmetric (Sharpless asymmetric dihydroxylation).

Osmium(VIII) oxide is also used in catalytic amounts in the Sharpless oxyamination to give vicinal amino-alcohols.

In combination with sodium periodate, OsO_{4} is used for the oxidative cleavage of alkenes (Lemieux-Johnson oxidation) when the periodate serves both to cleave the diol formed by dihydroxylation, and to regenerate OsO_{4}. The net transformation is identical to that produced by ozonolysis. Below an example from the total synthesis of Isosteviol.

=== Biological staining ===
OsO_{4} is a widely used staining agent used in transmission electron microscopy (TEM) to provide contrast to the image. This staining method may also be known in the literature as the OTO (osmium-thiocarbohydrazide-osmium) method, or osmium impregnation technique or simply as osmium staining. As a lipid stain, it is also useful in scanning electron microscopy (SEM) as an alternative to sputter coating. It embeds a heavy metal directly into cell membranes, creating a high electron scattering rate without the need for coating the membrane with a layer of metal, which can obscure details of the cell membrane. In the staining of the plasma membrane, osmium(VIII) oxide binds phospholipid head regions, thus creating contrast with the neighbouring protoplasm (cytoplasm). Additionally, osmium(VIII) oxide is also used for fixing biological samples in conjunction with HgCl_{2}. Its rapid killing abilities are used to quickly kill live specimens such as protozoa. OsO_{4} stabilizes many proteins by transforming them into gels without destroying structural features. Tissue proteins that are stabilized by OsO_{4} are not coagulated by alcohols during dehydration. Osmium(VIII) oxide is also used as a stain for lipids in optical microscopy. OsO_{4} also stains the human cornea (see safety considerations).

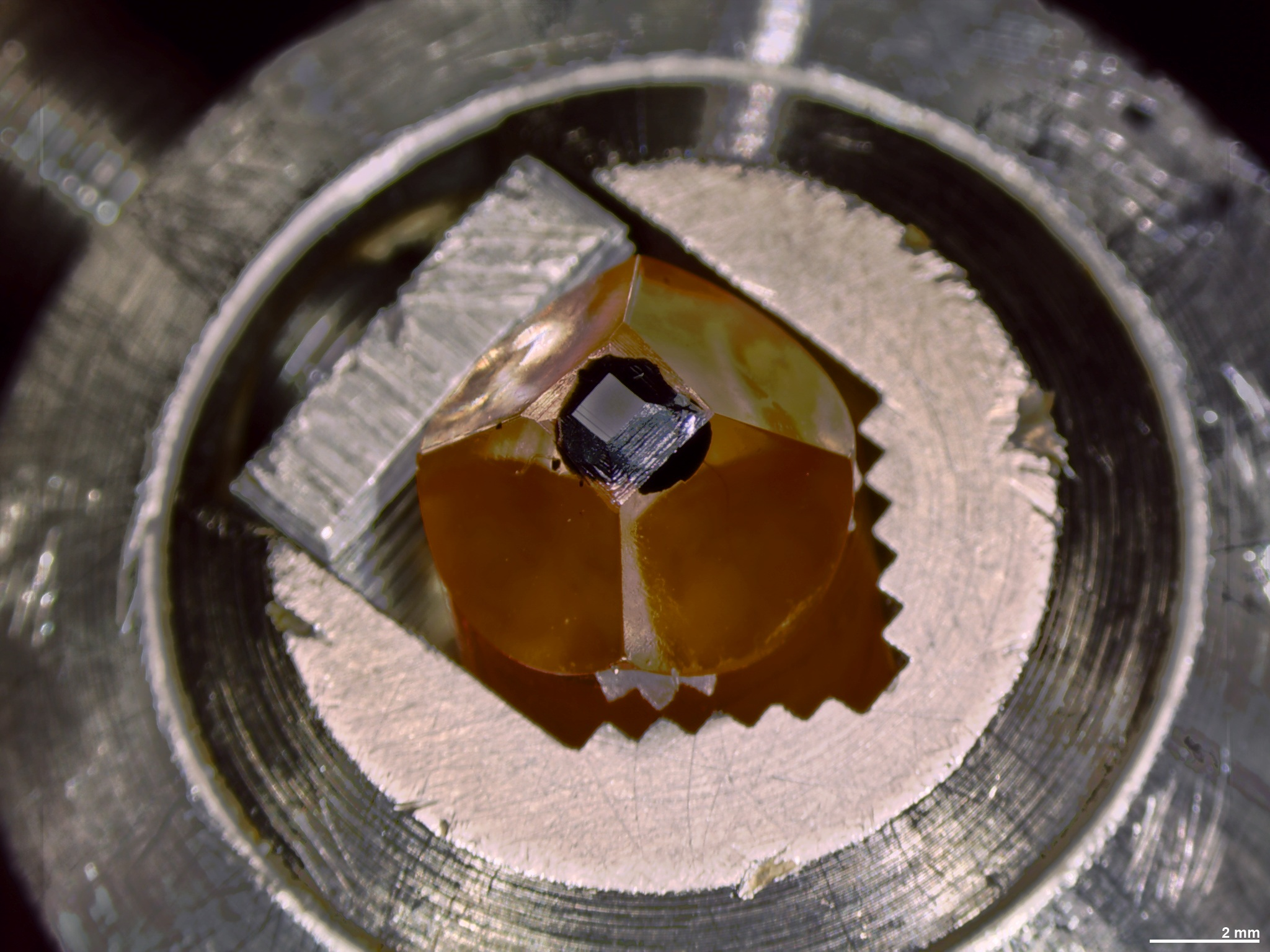
A sample of cells fixed/stained with osmium tetroxide (black) embedded in epoxy resin (amber). The cells are black as a result of the effects of osmium tetroxide.

=== Polymer staining ===
It is also used to stain copolymers preferentially, the best known example being block copolymers where one phase can be stained so as to show the microstructure of the material. For example, styrene-butadiene block copolymers have a central polybutadiene chain with polystyrene end caps. When treated with OsO_{4}, the butadiene matrix reacts preferentially and so absorbs the oxide. The presence of a heavy metal is sufficient to block the electron beam, so the polystyrene domains are seen clearly in thin films in TEM.

=== Osmium ore refining ===
OsO_{4} is an intermediate in the extraction of osmium from its ores. Osmium-containing residues are treated with sodium peroxide (Na_{2}O_{2}) forming Na_{2}[OsO_{4}(OH)_{2}], which is soluble. When exposed to chlorine, this salt gives OsO_{4}. In the final stages of refining, crude OsO_{4} is dissolved in alcoholic NaOH forming Na_{2}[OsO_{2}(OH)_{4}], which, when treated with NH_{4}Cl, gives [OsO_{2}(NH_{4})_{3}]Cl_{2}. This salt is reduced under hydrogen to give osmium.

=== Buckminsterfullerene adduct ===
OsO_{4} allowed for the confirmation of the soccer ball model of buckminsterfullerene, a 60-atom carbon allotrope. The adduct, formed from a derivative of OsO_{4}, was C_{60}(OsO_{4})(4-tert-butylpyridine)_{2}. The adduct broke the fullerene's symmetry, allowing for crystallization and confirmation of the structure of C_{60} by X-ray crystallography.

=== Medicine ===
The only known clinical use of osmium tetroxide is for the treatment of arthritis. The lack of reports of long-term side effects from the local administration of osmium tetroxide (OsO_{4}) suggest that osmium itself can be biocompatible, though this depends on the osmium compound administered.

== Safety considerations ==
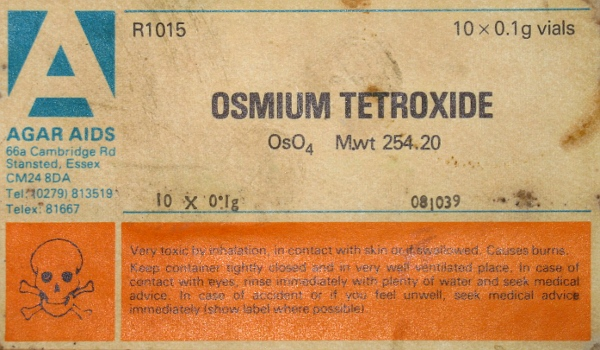
Label with poison warning

OsO_{4} will irreversibly stain the human cornea, which can lead to blindness. The permissible exposure limit for osmium(VIII) oxide (8 hour time-weighted average) is 2 μg/m^{3}. Osmium(VIII) oxide can penetrate plastics and food packaging, and therefore must be stored in glass under refrigeration.
