= Toluene dioxygenase =

Class of enzymes

toluene dioxygenase

Identifiers
- EC no.: 1.14.12.11
- CAS no.: 120038-36-0

Databases
- IntEnz: IntEnz view
- BRENDA: BRENDA entry
- ExPASy: NiceZyme view
- KEGG: KEGG entry
- MetaCyc: metabolic pathway
- PRIAM: profile
- PDB structures: RCSB PDB PDBe PDBsum
- Gene Ontology: AmiGO / QuickGO
Search
- PMC: articles
- PubMed: articles
- NCBI: proteins

In enzymology, toluene dioxygenase (EC 1.14.12.11) is an enzyme that catalyzes the chemical reaction

toluene
+ NADH
O_{2} + H^{+}
(1S,2R)-3-methylcyclohexa-3,5-diene-1,2-diol
+ NAD^{+}

The four substrates of this enzyme are toluene, reduced nicotinamide adenine dinucleotide (NADH), oxygen, and a proton. Its products are (1S,2R)-3-methylcyclohexa-3,5-diene-1,2-diol and reduced NAD^{+}.

This enzyme is an oxidoreductase, that uses molecular oxygen as oxidant and incorporates both its atoms into the starting material. The systematic name of this enzyme class is toluene,NADH:oxygen oxidoreductase (1,2-hydroxylating). This enzyme is also called toluene 2,3-dioxygenase. It is an iron–sulfur protein that uses flavin adenine dinucleotide as a cofactor and participates in toluene and xylene degradation.
