= Mono-N-protected amino acids =

Chiral ligands

Mono-N-protected amino acid (MPAA) is a bifunctional ligand that plays a key role in C–H functionalizations by accelerating the reaction rate and imparting specified chirality into the product. Amino acids are ideal building blocks for chiral ligand synthesis due to the cost, accessibility, large variety, solubility, and inherent chirality. Naturally occurring amino acids are transformed into chiral MPAA ligands that, upon coordination to metal complexes, allow reactions to occur that are otherwise energetically unfavorable. Great strides in the development of MPAA ligands over the past two decades have led to the integral role that enantioselective catalysis now plays in complex organic synthesis.

== History and development ==
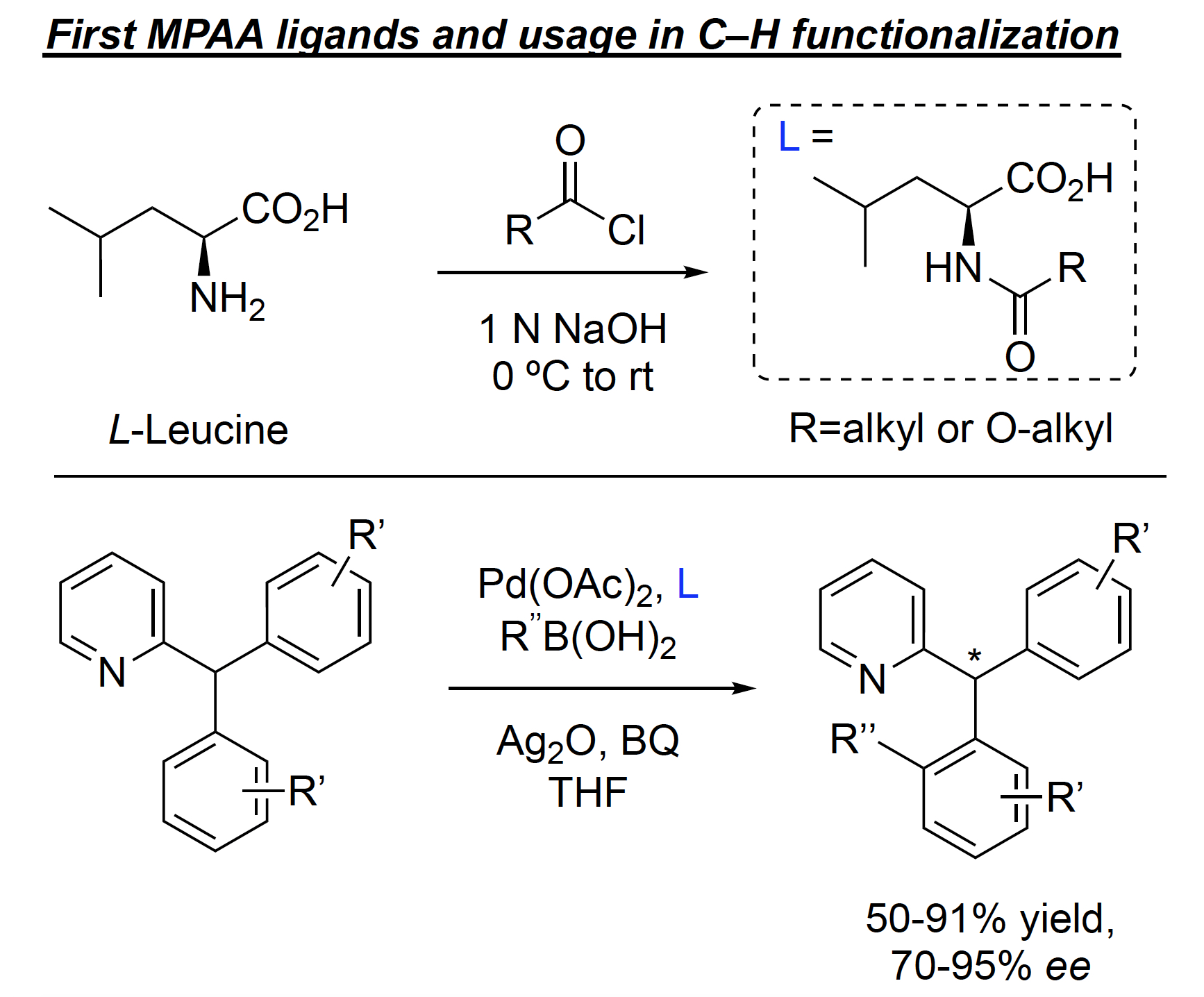

In the past century, there has been much research into the development of effective chiral catalysts due to its great potential in organic synthesis. In the 1960s, cyclometalation reactions including C(sp^{2})–H and C(sp^{3})–H cleavage were pioneered by Kleiman, Dubeck, Cope, and Siekman. A decade later, Shaw discovered that inorganic acetate salts promoted otherwise difficult cyclopalladations. To build off of this work, Sokolov focused on developing chiral, enantioenriched metallacyles and proposed the concerted metal-deprotonation (CMD) mechanism.

Despite this foundation of discoveries, enantioselective catalysis for C–H functionalization continued to lack in efficiency and selectivity for desired chiral product formation. In 2008, Jin-Quan Yu reported the first MPAA ligands, showcasing their use in enantioselective activation of C(sp^{2})–H and C(sp^{3})–H bonds. Initial synthesis occurred by reacting the nucleophilic amino acid in base with a highly electrophilic acyl chloride resulting in one new amide bond formation. Upon addition of acyl chloride, most resulting groups off of the nitrogen were common protecting groups used in organic synthesis, hence mono-N-protected. Taking advantage of the weak coordination of amides and carboxylates with Pd-complexes, this enantioselective catalysis requires the MPAA ligand to allow the reaction to proceed and determine the product chirality, minimizing side reactions that may occur without the ligand. Since the initial discovery, Yu has continued to pioneer the field by expanding the substrate scope, increasing functional group tolerance, and developing ligand variations.

== Mechanism ==
After iterative computational and experimental studies, the internal amidate mechanism was proposed in collaboration of Wu, Yu, and Houk. In the proposed mechanism, the trimeric Pd-precatalyst converts to the mono-Pd complex with coordination to solvent and the bidentate MPAA ligand. Mass spectrometry results reveal this active catalyst which forms favorably with the stabilizing dianionic MPAA ligand as computations suggest.

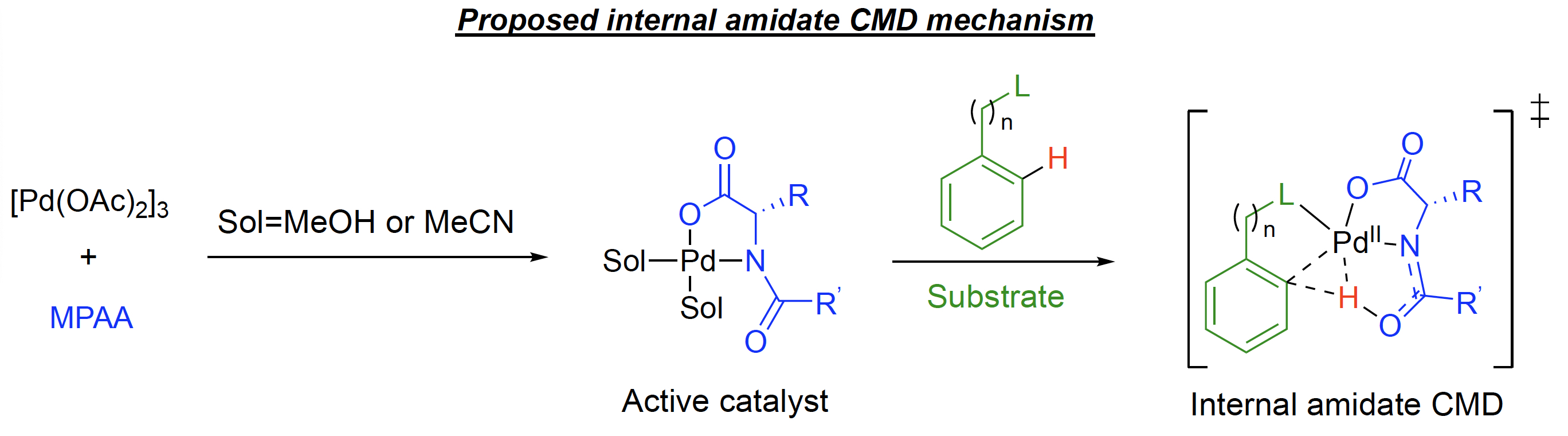

The key intermediate step of these cyclometalation reactions involves the metal-mediated cleavage of the C–H bond and simultaneous formation of the metal–C bond of the substrate. Upon addition of substrate, the N-acyl motif acts as an internal proton acceptor in the concerted metal-deprotonation (CMD) of the transition state for this inner-sphere process. According to this model, the rate and selectivity of the C–H functionalization are impacted by the basicity of the MPAA ligand. The resulting experimental data of steric and electronic alteration of the MPAA ligands align with this model. In 2023, the first experimental observations to support the proposed mechanism were reported, which were previously unattainable due to the lack of well-defined isolated palladium-MPAA complexes.

== Ligand variations ==
Since the initial MPAA ligand report, many variations of bifunctional ligands derived from amino acids have been developed. Bidentate MPAQ (mono-protected amino quinoline) ligands were introduced in the application of β-methylene C–H bonds in aliphatic amides. The highly successful MPAO (mono-protected amino oxazoline) ligand allowed for C(sp^{3})–H functionalization via arylation of α-methyls, borylation of cyclobutyl carboxylic amides, and boronic cross coupling of alkyl amines. MPAAM (mono-protected aminoalkyl amine) ligands were used in enantioselective C(sp^{3})–H arylations of free aliphatic acids without the need for exogenous directing groups. Variations of the MPAAThio (mono-protected aminoalkyl thioether) ligands have been use in olefination of free carboxylic acids and arylation, carbonylation, and olefination of free aliphatic amines.

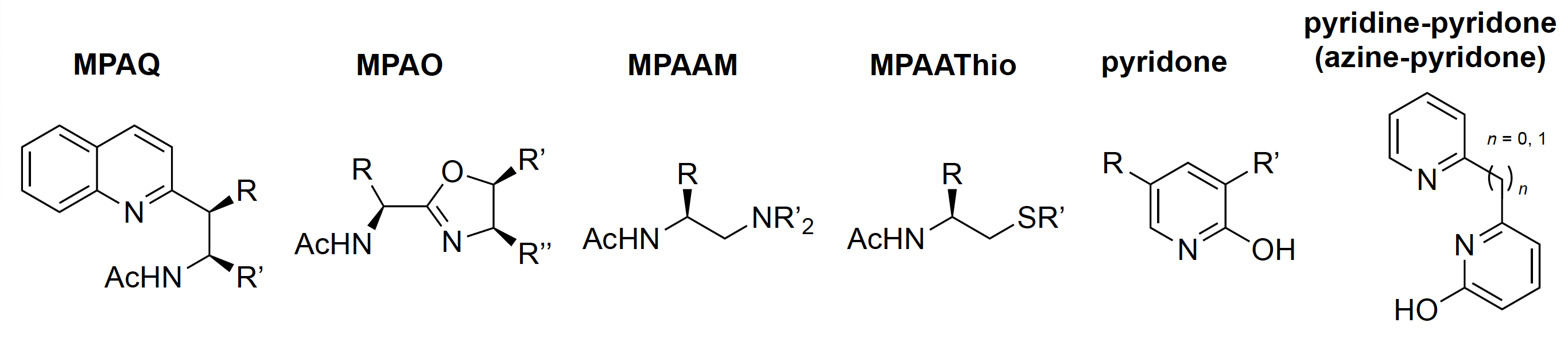

Expanding the reaction substrate scope to non-directed C(sp^{2})–H bonds, pyridone ligands were developed to functionalize arenes and heteroarenes which proved to be particularly useful in late-state derivatization of bioactive compounds such as estrone, caffeine, and camptothecin. Many analogues of the pyridine-pyridone (azine-pyridone) ligands were developed and used in the C(sp^{2})–H hydroxylation of (hetero)arenes and the dehydrogenation of methylene C(sp^{3})–H bonds on alkyl free acids.

== Applications in total synthesis ==
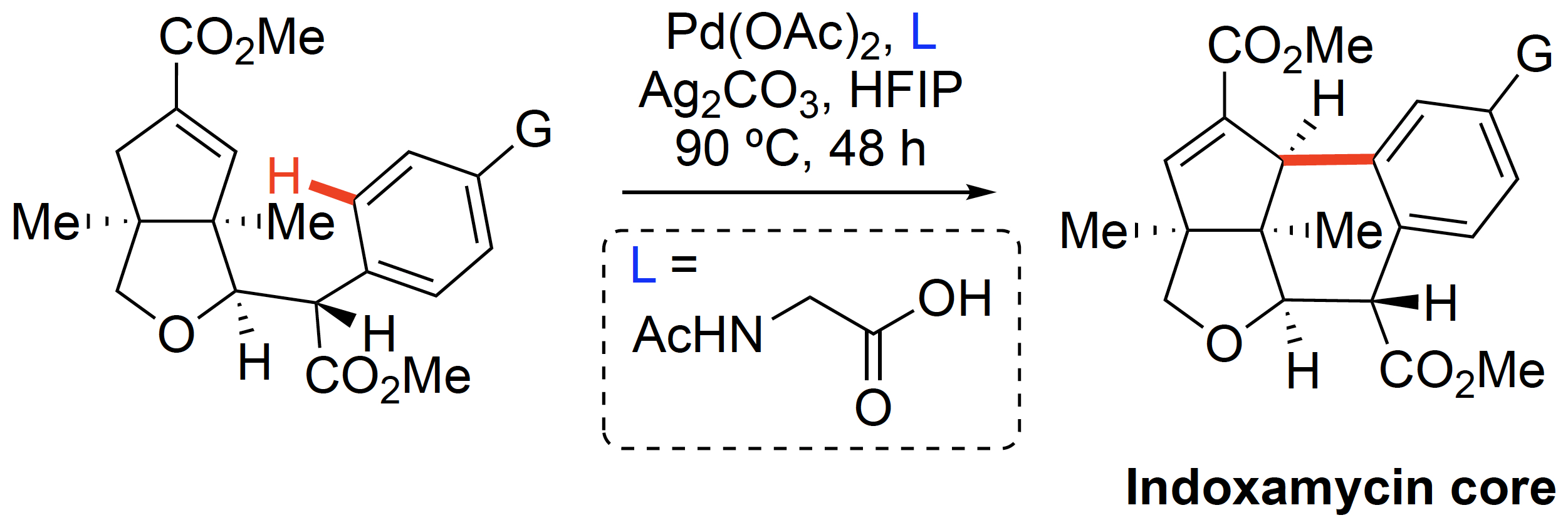

The development of MPAA ligands enabled and improved the synthesis of many complex natural products. Examples include Arnottin 1, Aspercylide B, Berkelic Acid, Boletopsin 11, Danshenspiroketallactone, Delavatine A, Herbindole B/cis-Trikentrin A, Hongoquercin A, Incarviatone A, Indoxamycin, Kedarcidin/Neocarzinostatin, Kinamycin

, Lithospermic Acid, M1 PAMs, and VS-548. In the formation of indoxamycin cores, MPAA ligand assisted C–H functionalization introduces high complexity via intramolecular ortho olefination.

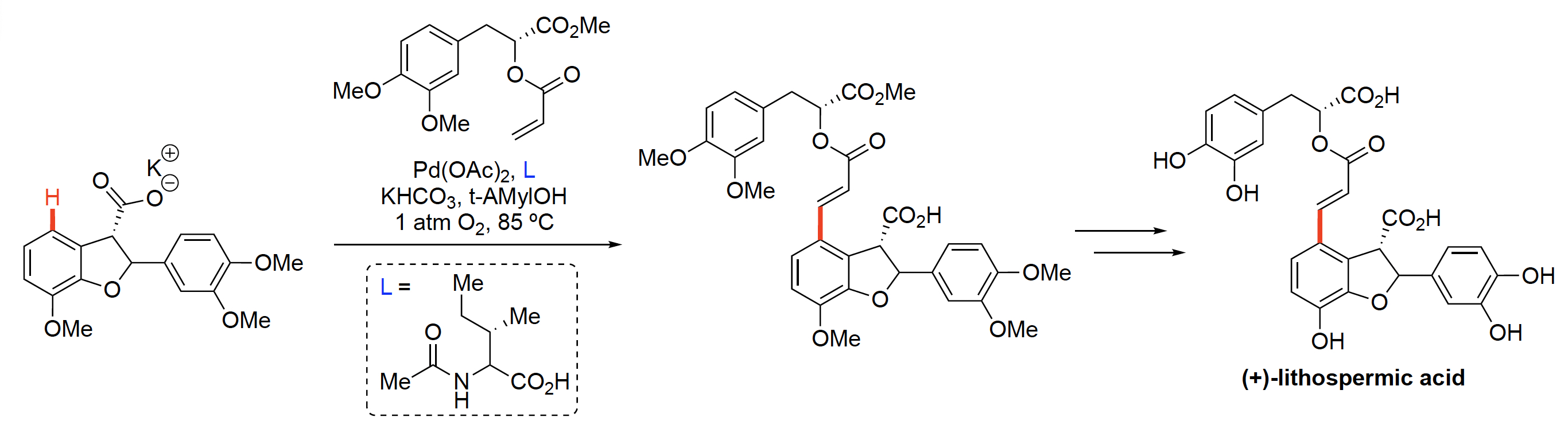

The use of C–H functionalization in the synthesis of lithospheric acid exemplifies the site- and stereoselective capabilities of using MPAA ligands in these reactions. As the penultimate step, the intermolecular C–H olefination introduces almost double the complexity into the compound enabling the highly convergent synthesis.
