= Amination =

Chemical reaction

Amination is the process by which an amine group is introduced into an organic molecule. This type of reaction is important because organonitrogen compounds are pervasive.

== Reactions ==
=== Aminase enzymes ===
Enzymes that catalyse this reaction are termed aminases. Enzymatic amination can occur in a number of ways including reaction with ammonia or another amine such as an alkylation, reductive amination and the Mannich reaction.

=== Alcohol substitutions ===
Many alkyl amines are produced industrially by the amination of alcohols using ammonia in the presence of solid acid catalysts, to dehydrate the alcohol into an alkene. Illustrative is the production of tert-butylamine:

NH_{3} + CH_{2}=C(CH_{3})_{2} → H_{2}NC(CH_{3})_{3}

The Ritter reaction of isobutene with hydrogen cyanide is not useful in this case because it produces too much waste.

Similarly, α-hydroxy acids can be converted into amino acids directly using aqueous ammonia solution, hydrogen gas and a heterogeneous metallic ruthenium catalyst.

=== Electrophilic amination ===
Usually, the amine reacts as the nucleophile with another organic compound acting as the electrophile. This sense of reactivity may be reversed for some electron-deficient amines, including oxaziridines, hydroxylamines, oximes, and other N–O substrates. When the amine is used as an electrophile, the reaction is called electrophilic amination. Electron-rich organic substrates that may be used as nucleophiles for this process include carbanions and enolates.

=== Hydro- and carboamination ===
In hydroamination, amines add to alkenes. When substituted amines add, the result is alkene carboamination.

== See also ==
- Alkylation, the addition of an alkyl group
- Acylation, the addition of an acyl group (-C(O)R)
- Deamination
