= C26H34O7 =

The molecular formula C_{26}H_{34}O_{7} (molar mass: 458.54 g/mol, exact mass: 458.2305 u) may refer to:

- Berkeleytrione
- Fumagillin
