= Alkene carboamination =

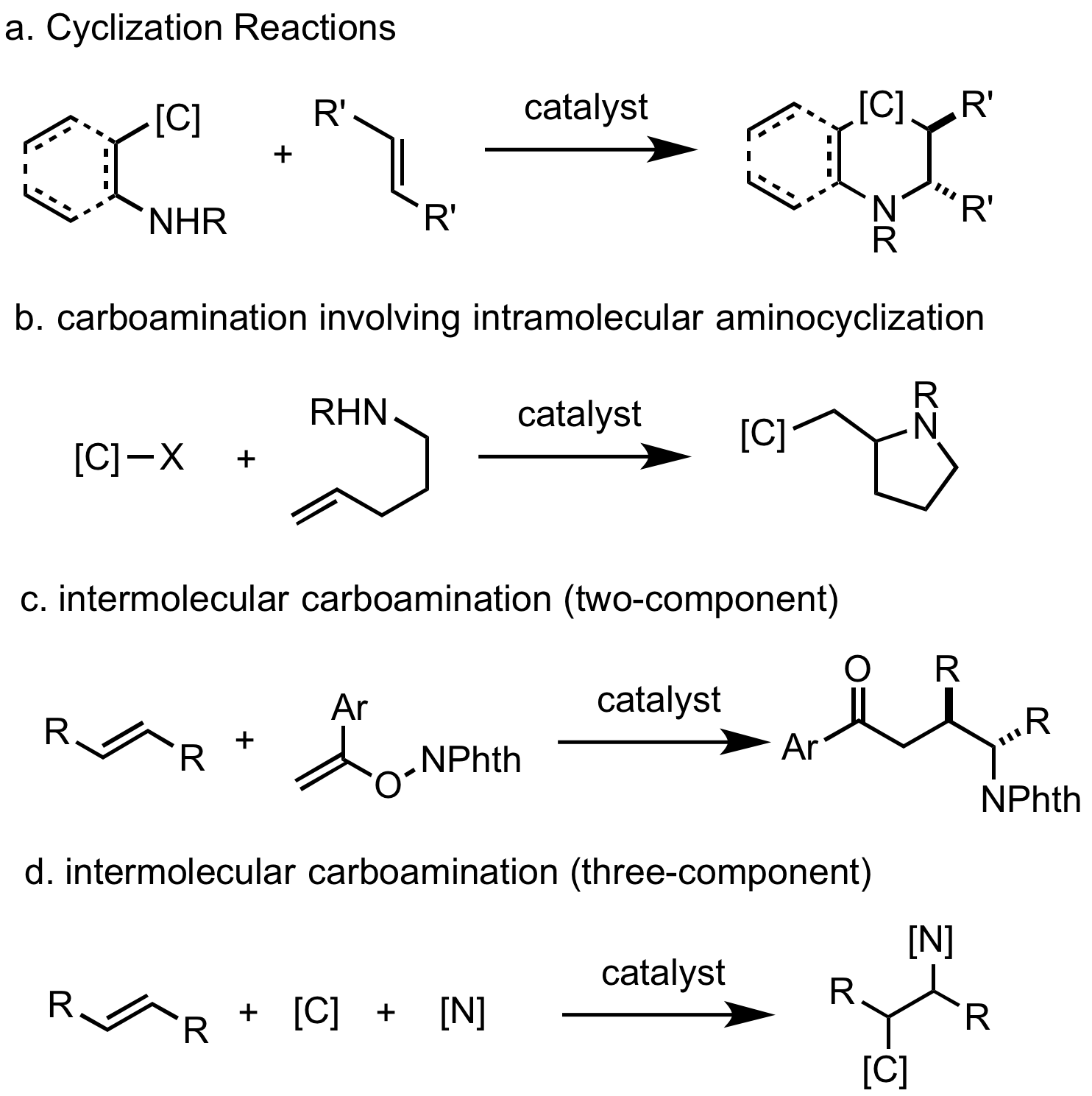

Alkene carboamination is the simultaneous formation of C–N and C–C bonds across an alkene. This method represents a powerful strategy to build molecular complexity with up to two stereocenters in a single operation. Generally, there are four categories of reaction modes for alkene carboamination. The first class is cyclization reactions, which will form a N-heterocycle as a result. The second class has been well established in the last decade. Alkene substrates with a tethered nitrogen nucleophile have been used in these transformations to promote intramolecular aminocyclization. While intermolecular carboamination is extremely hard, people have developed a strategy to combine the nitrogen and carbon part, which is known as the third class. The most general carboamination, which takes three individual parts and couples them together is still underdeveloped.

== Reaction mechanisms ==
Different transition metals have been used to catalyze carboamination reactions, including palladium, copper, and rhodium etc. The reaction mechanism varies with different transition metals. For palladium-catalyzed carboamination reactions, Pd(0)/Pd(II) and Pd(II)/Pd(IV) catalytic cycles are the most common mechanisms that have been proposed.

The reaction mode for the key aminopalladation step is different in these two cases. In Wolfe’s chemistry, which is known as the Pd(0)/Pd(II) catalytic system, syn-aminopalladation is observed. While in the Pd(II)/Pd(IV) catalytic system, which was developed by Forrest Michael, anti-aminopalladation was observed. It is believed that the pH of the reaction will affect the existing form of the amine nucleophile, which will determine whether the nitrogen coordinates with palladium center or not during the aminopalladation step. For the C–H activation step in Pd(II)/Pd(IV) chemistry, since there is no directing effect on the aromatic ring, large excess of arenes are required.

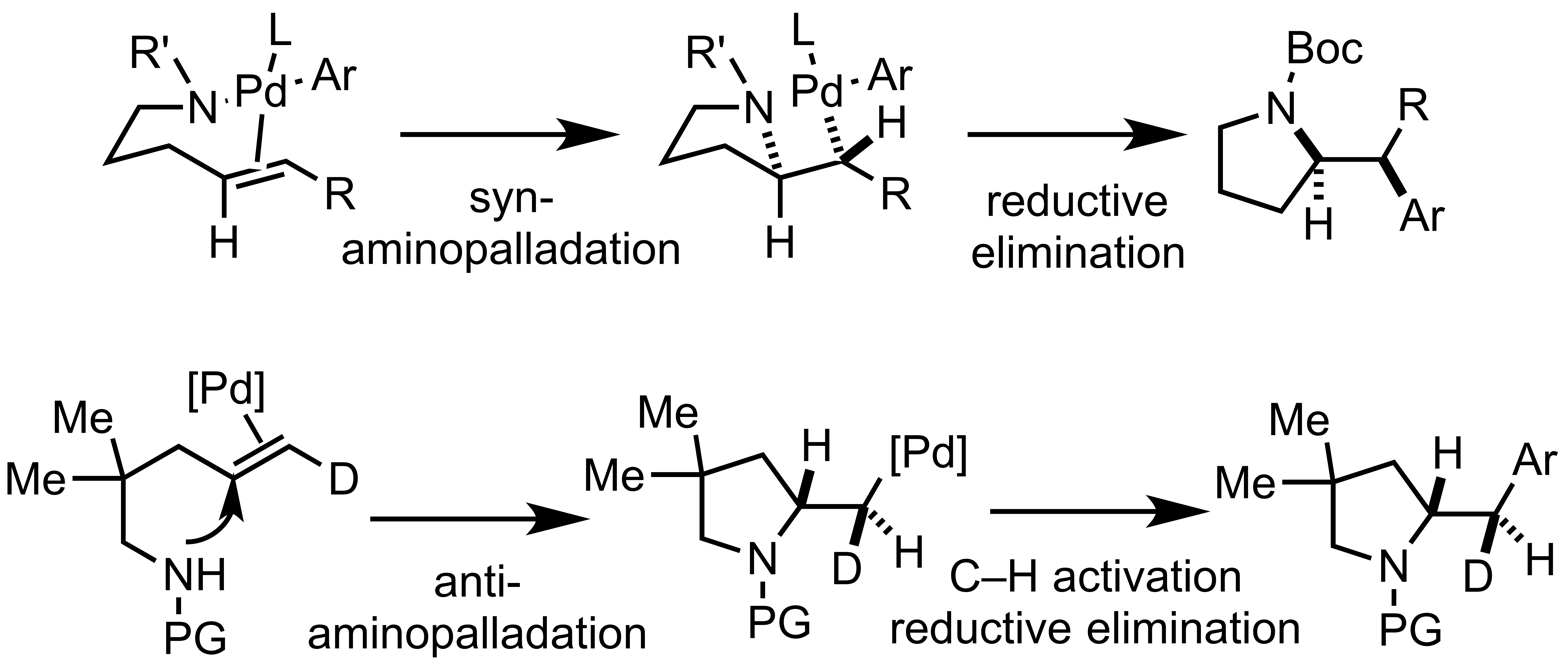

In 2015, Rovis and coworkers reported a rhodium-catalyzed intermolecular carboamination. In this reaction, enoxyphthalimide was used to serve as both the nitrogen and carbon source. The reaction mechanism is proposed in the paper (vide infra).

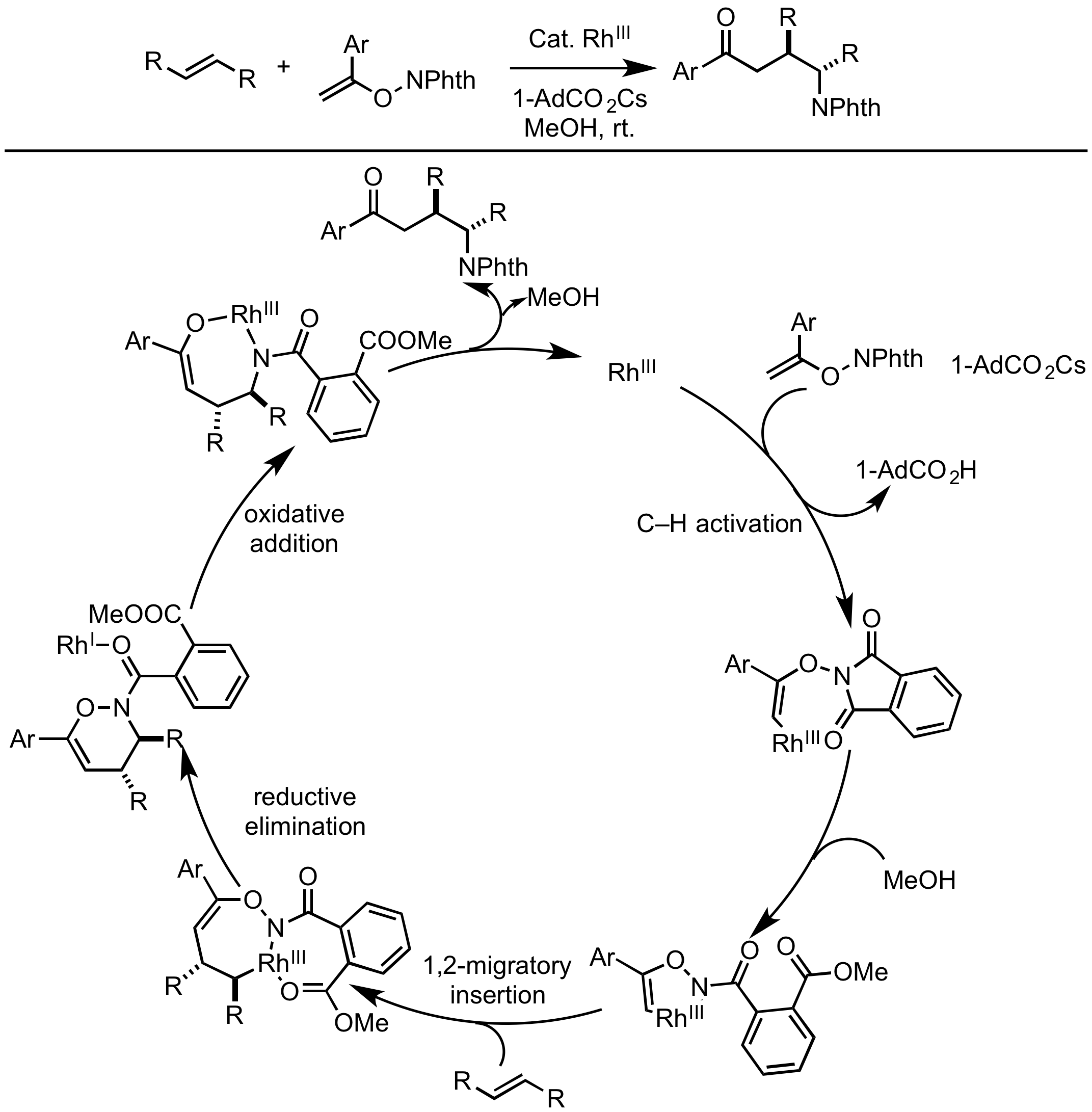

In 2017, Liu and coworkers reported a copper-catalyzed three component carboamination reaction of styrenes. In the meantime, Engle and coworkers published a palladium-catalyzed three component carboamination reaction using directing group strategy. These two works are the very rare examples of three component carboamination reactions.

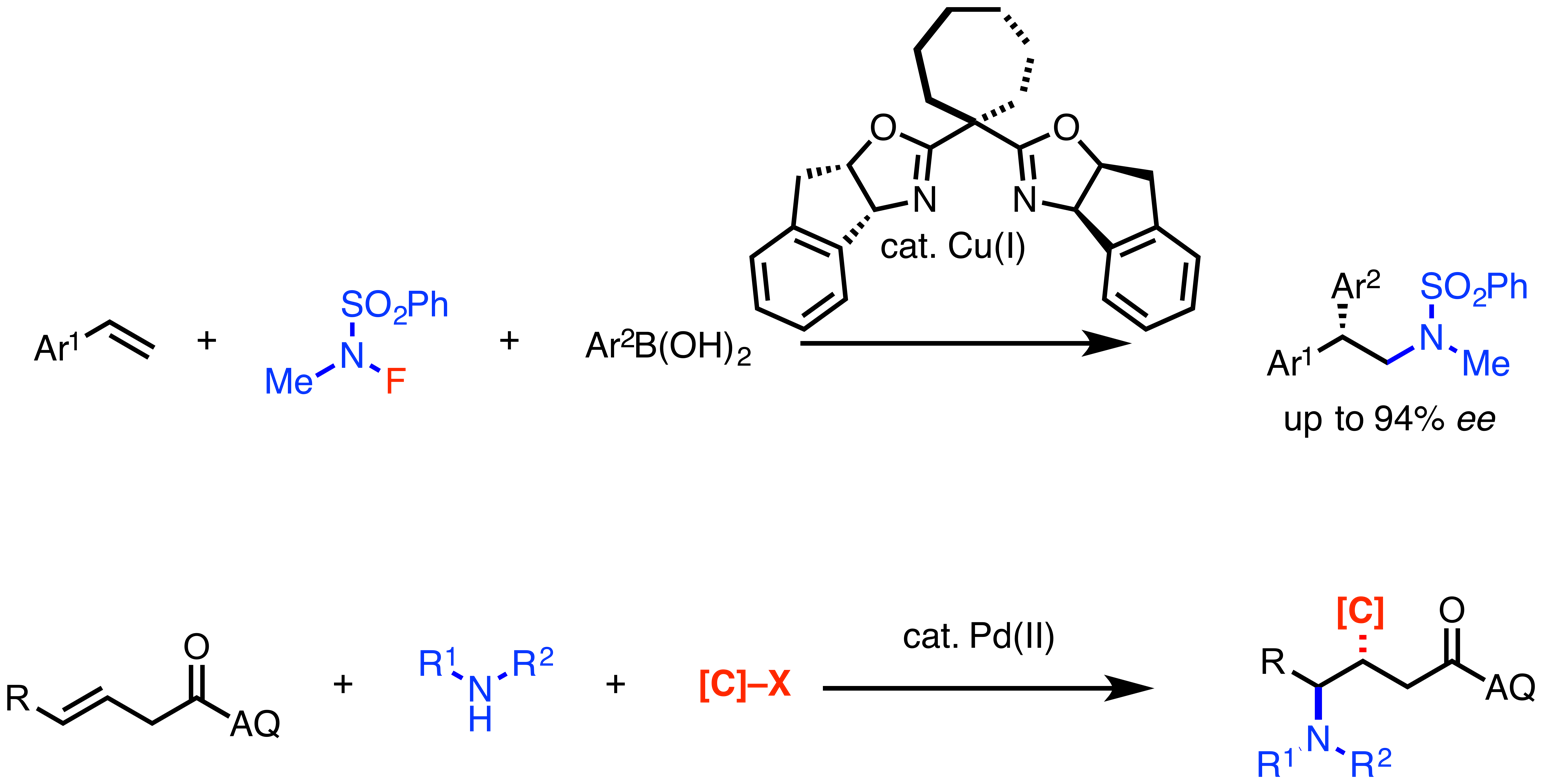

== Applications ==
Carboamination is an efficient method to access nitrogen-containing molecules, especially N-heterocycles. (+)-Preussin, a pyrrolidine alkaloid, can be easily prepared via this methodology.

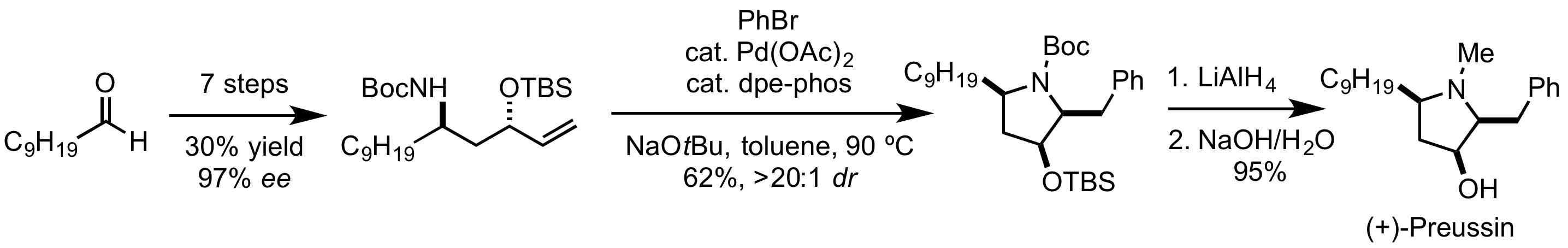
(+)-Preussin Synthesis

(−)-Tylophorine is another example, which can be synthesized using carboamination reaction.

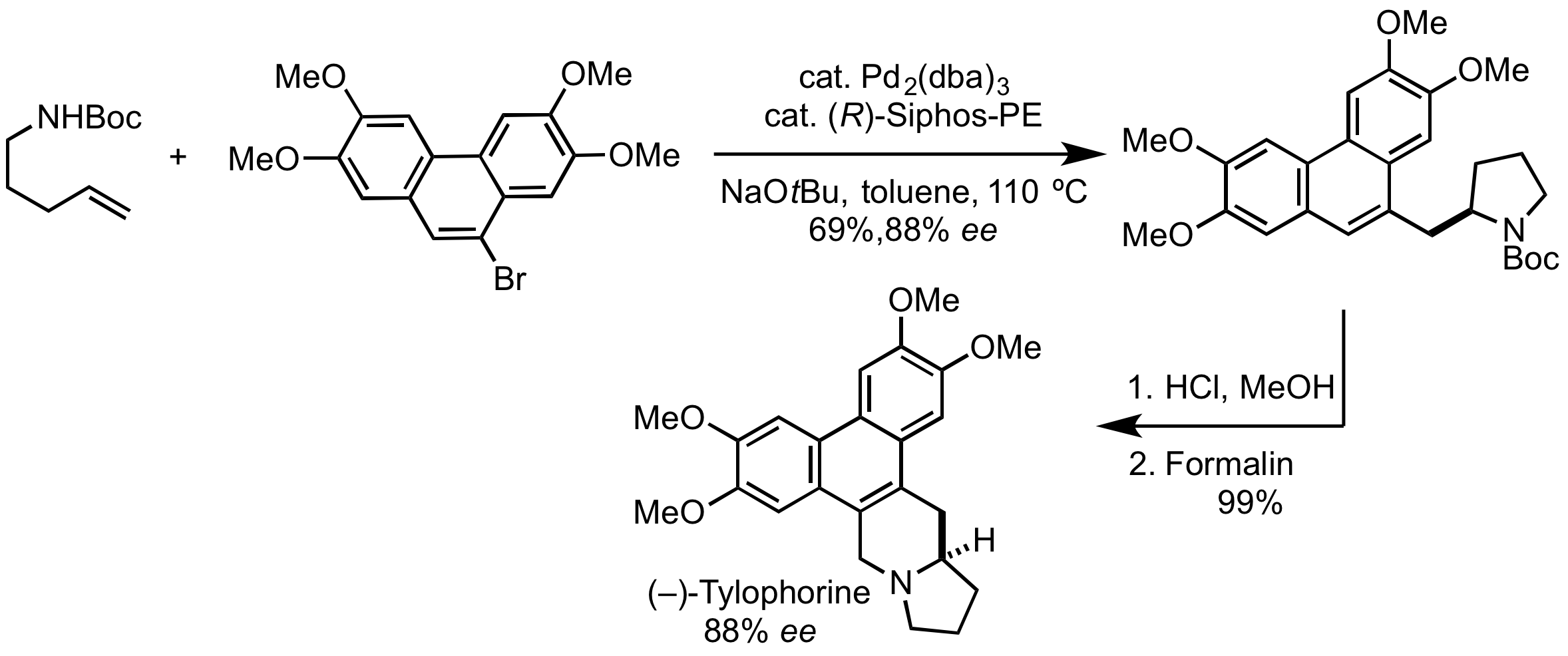
(−)-Tylophorine Synthesis
