= Berkeley Pit =

Former open pit copper mine in Montana, United States

Silver Bow Creek/Butte Area
- Superfund site
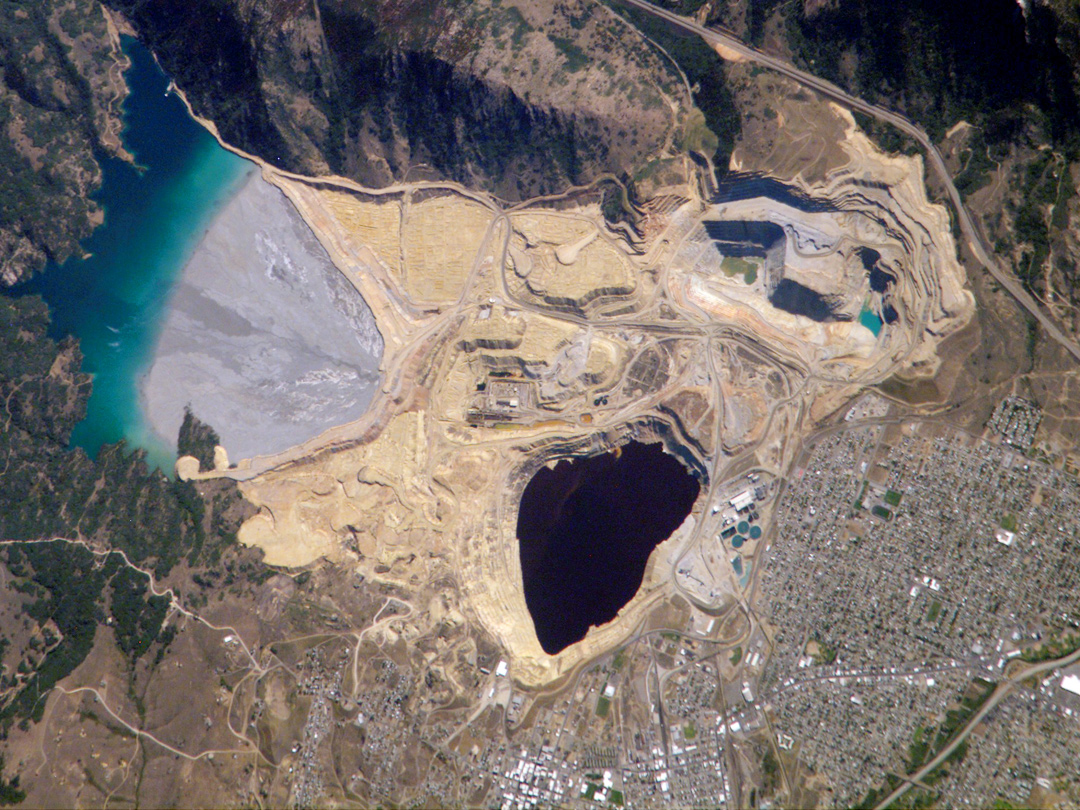
- Berkeley Pit (center) and Yankee Doodle Tailings Pond (upper left) with terraced levels/access roadways. The city of Butte is at lower right.

- Location within the United States Location within Montana
- Location: Butte, Silver Bow, Montana; 46.02°N 112.51°W

Information
- CERCLIS ID: MTD980502777
- Contaminants: Arsenic, cadmium, copper, zinc, lead

Progress
- Proposed: 30 December 1982
- Listed: 8 September 1983

The Berkeley Pit is a former open pit copper mine in the western United States, located in Butte, Montana. It is one mile (1.6 km) long by one-half mile (800 m) wide, with an approximate maximum depth of 1,780 feet (540 m). It is filled to a depth of about 900 feet (270 m) with water that is acidic (4.1 - 4.5 pH level), about the acidity of beer or tomatoes. As a result, the pit's water is laden with heavy metals and dissolved metals that leach from the rock in a natural process known as acid rock drainage. The pit's water content includes (but is not limited to) dissolved copper, arsenic, cadmium, zinc, and sulfuric acid.

The mine was opened in 1955 and operated by the Anaconda Copper Mining Company, and later by the Atlantic Richfield Company (ARCO), until its closure on April 22, 1982. When the pit was closed, the water pumps in the nearby Kelley Mine, 3,800 ft (1,200 m) below the surface, were turned off, and groundwater began to slowly fill the Berkeley Pit, rising at about the rate of one foot (30 cm) per month. Since its closure, the water level in the pit has risen to within 150 feet (46 m) of the "protective water level", above which the polluted water might flow into a nearby creek and other local water sources. As a result, a water treatment plant has been operating at the site since October 2019.

The Berkeley Pit can be visited by tourists, with a viewing stand and small visitor center.

== History ==
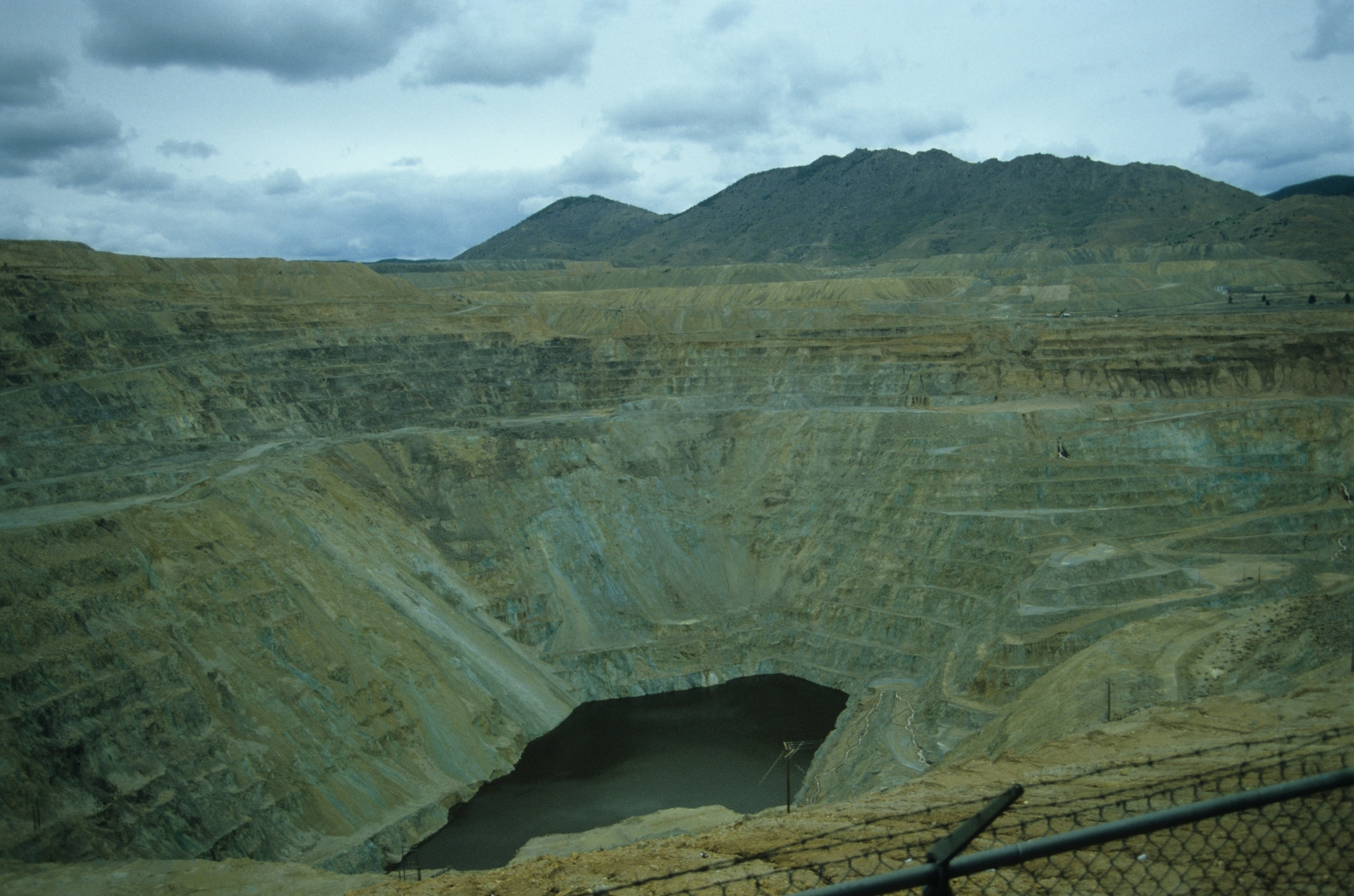
The Berkeley Pit in May 1984. Note the much higher water level in the more recent fisheye view, below.

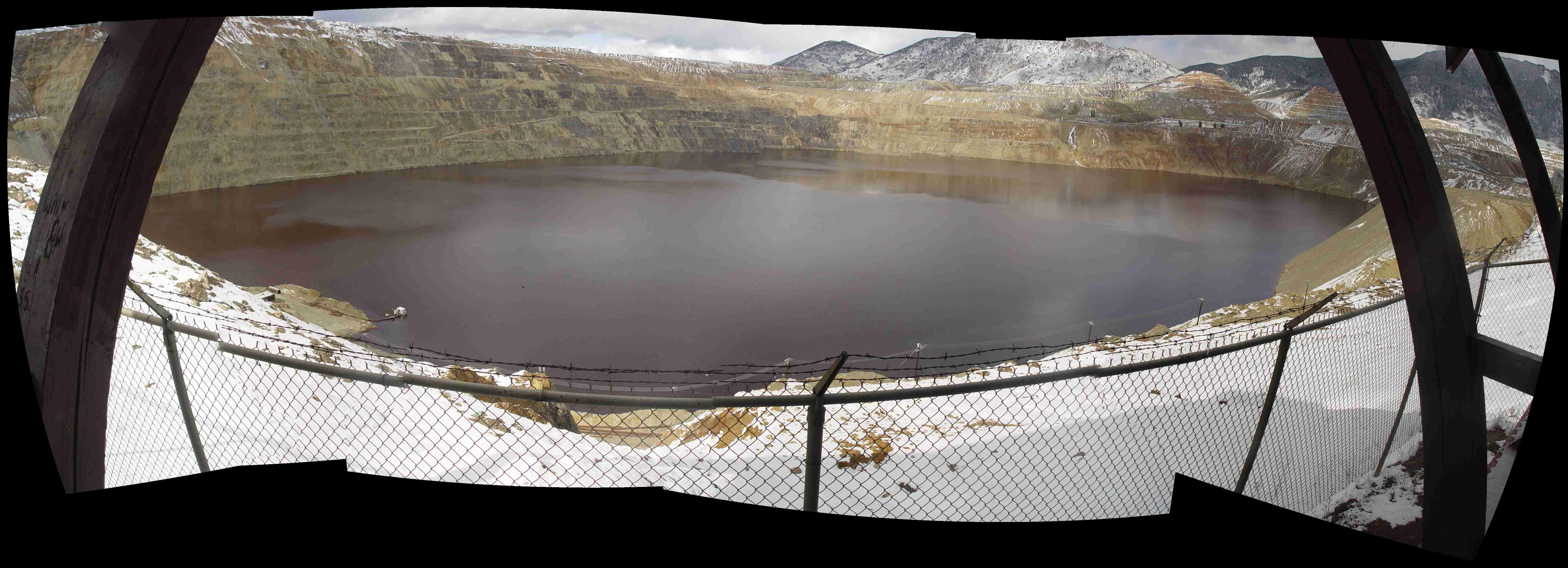
Composite Fisheye View of the Berkeley Pit, April 2005

The underground Berkeley Mine was located on a prominent vein extending to the southeast from the main Anaconda vein system (sometimes called "the richest hill on earth"). When open pit mining operations began in July 1955, near the Berkeley Mine shaft, the older mine gave its name to the pit. The open-pit style of mining superseded underground operations because it was considered more economical and less dangerous to workers than underground mining.

Within the first year of operation, the pit extracted 17,000 tons of ore per day at a grade of 0.75% copper. Ultimately, about one billion tons of material were mined from the Berkeley Pit. Copper was the principal metal produced, although other metals were also extracted, including silver and gold.

Many of Butte's original ethnic mining communities including Meaderville, McQueen, East Butte, Dublin Gulch, and Finntown were consumed by land purchases to expand the pit eastward during the 1970s. The Anaconda Company bought the homes, businesses and schools built over remaining ore deposits. Homes were either destroyed by pit expansion or moved to the southern end of Butte. Although residents were compensated to some extent for their acquired property, many thriving ethnic communities were lost.

== Pollution, toxicity, and cleanup ==
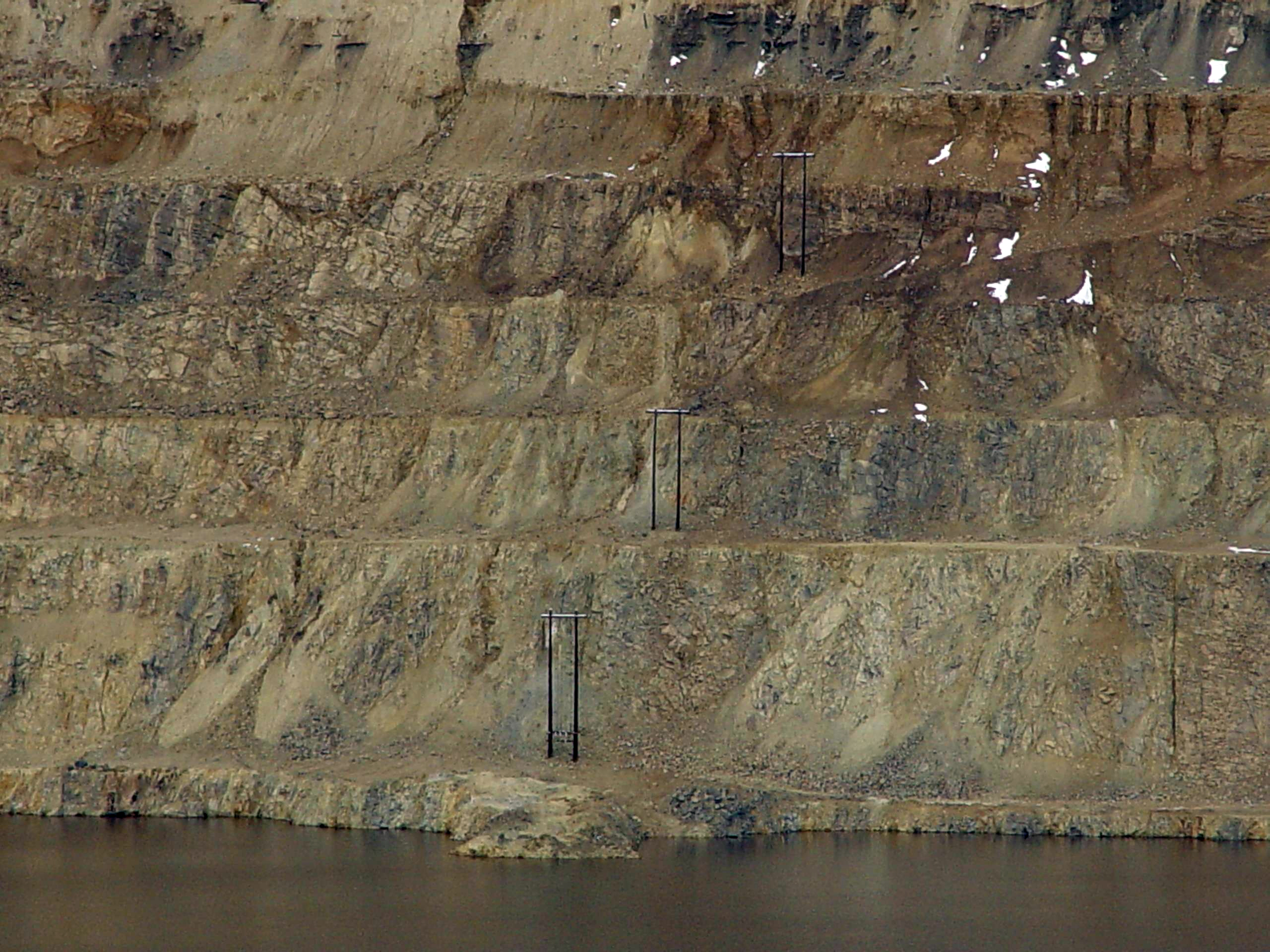
Perspective: Power line poles descending the walls of the pit. The poles are located slightly to the right of center in the above Composite Fisheye View, April 2005.

The Berkeley Pit is located within the Butte Mine Flooding Operable Unit, a part of the Silver Bow Creek/Butte Area Environmental Protection Agency Superfund site. The pit itself was added to the federal Superfund site list in 1987.

=== Water ===
The Berkeley Pit is a low spot and acts like a sump for contaminated water. For this reason, it is currently an active part of the remedy for this operable unit. A pilot water treatment project was initiated in 2019. It began treating and releasing Berkeley Pit water into Silver Bow Creek at the confluence with Blacktail Creek. This was done to protect the local groundwater from eventually becoming contaminated by rising pit water. The plant cost $19 million and was designed to treat ten million gallons of water per day.

=== Waterfowl ===
In 1996, 342 snow geese carcasses were recovered from the pit by researchers performing water quality testing. ARCO, the custodian of the pit, denied that the toxic water caused the death of the geese, attributing the deaths to an acute aspergillosis infection that may have been caused by a grain fungus, as substantiated by necropsy findings from Colorado State University. These findings were disputed by the State of Montana on the basis of its own lab tests. Necropsies showed their esophagi were lined with burns and sores from exposure to acidic metalliferous water. As a result, waterfowl protection efforts were initiated.

On November 28, 2016, upwards of 60,000 snow geese landed in the pit during inclement weather. Once discovered, officials made efforts to haze the birds off of the pit's water and prevent more from landing in the area. Three to four thousand of the geese died. An official report issued in 2017 by the U.S. Fish and Wildlife Service found that the dead geese succumbed due to drinking the acidic metalliferous water.

After this event, Atlantic Richfield (AR) and Montana Resources (MR) further enhanced the waterfowl protection efforts which had been in place since 1996. A new Waterfowl Protection Plan was developed and allowed for adaptive management, testing, and incorporation new tools and techniques. Deterrents such as Phoenix Wailers, a type of noise machine, and propane cannons that mimic gunshots are placed around the rim of the pit to keep birds from landing. When waterfowl do land on the surface of the pit, personnel use firearms, hand-held lasers, and unmanned craft to haze them.

=== Protozoans ===
A protozoan species, Euglena mutabilis, was found to reside in the pit by Andrea A. Stierle and Donald B. Stierle, and the protozoans have been found to have adapted to the harsh conditions of the water. Intense competition for the limited resources caused these species to evolve the production of highly toxic compounds to improve survivability. Natural products such as berkeleydione, berkeleytrione, and berkelic acid have been isolated from these organisms which show selective activity against cancer cell lines. Some of these species ingest metals and are being investigated as an alternative means of cleaning the water.

=== Important dates ===
- 1994 – September, U.S. Environmental Protection Agency (EPA)/DEQ issue Record of Decision (ROD) for Butte Mine Flooding Operable Unit.
- 1996 – April, Montana Resources (MR) and ARCO divert Horseshoe Bend (HSB) drainage water away from Berkeley Pit to slow filling rate, per ROD.
- 2000 – July, MR suspends mining operations due to high energy costs; HSB water allowed to flow back into pit, increasing pit filling rate.
- 2002 – March, US EPA and Montana Department of Environmental Quality (MDEQ) enter into a Consent Decree with BP/ARCO and the Montana Resources Group (known as the Settling Defendants) for settlement of past and future costs for this site.
- 2002 (mid/late) – US EPA and MDEQ issue order for Settling Defendants to begin design of water treatment plant for HSB water. Settling Defendants issue contract and begin construction of treatment plant.
- 2003 – November, MR resumes mining operations.
- 2003 – November 17, HSB water treatment plant comes on line slowing pit filling rate.

== Geology ==
The mine is at an altitude of 4,698 feet (1432 m) above mean sea level. According to the Record of Decision, the pit water level is not to exceed 5,410 feet above sea level.

The Butte mining district is characterized by the Late Cretaceous boulder batholith which metamorphosed surrounding rocks during the Laramide orogeny. Ore formation occurred with the intrusion of the Butte quartz monzonite pluton. Mining of sulfide minerals began in the district in 1864. Placer deposits were mined out by 1867. Silver vein lodes were then the most productive until copper was discovered in 1881. Open-pit mining started in 1955. Copper has historically been the main metal produced, though lead, zinc, manganese, silver and gold have been produced at various times.

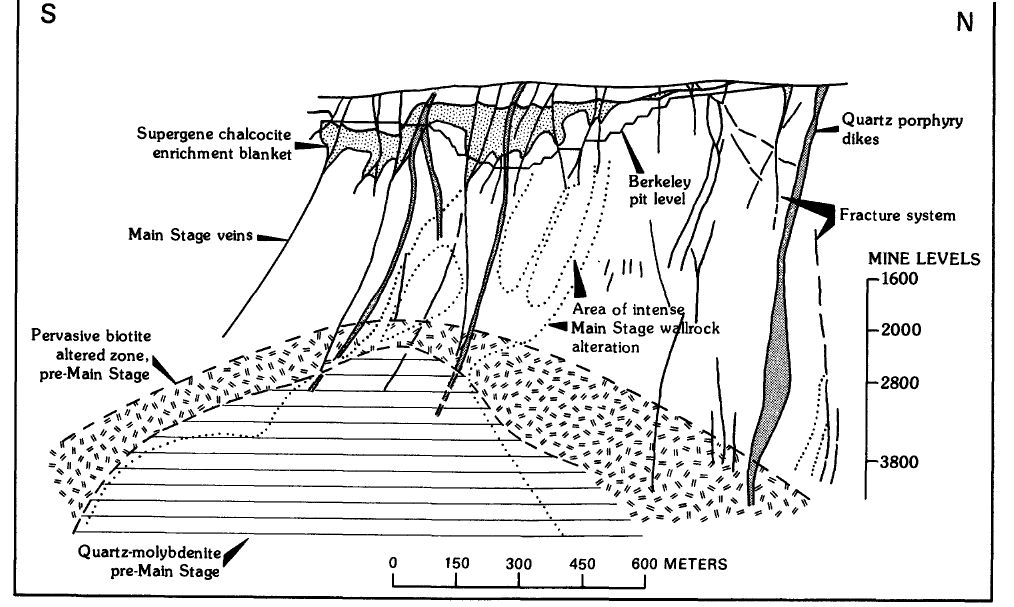
Geologic cross section

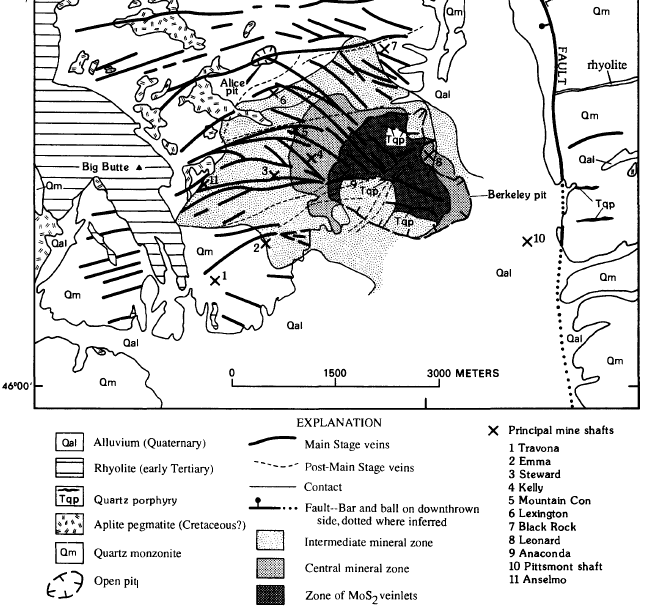
Butte District geological map

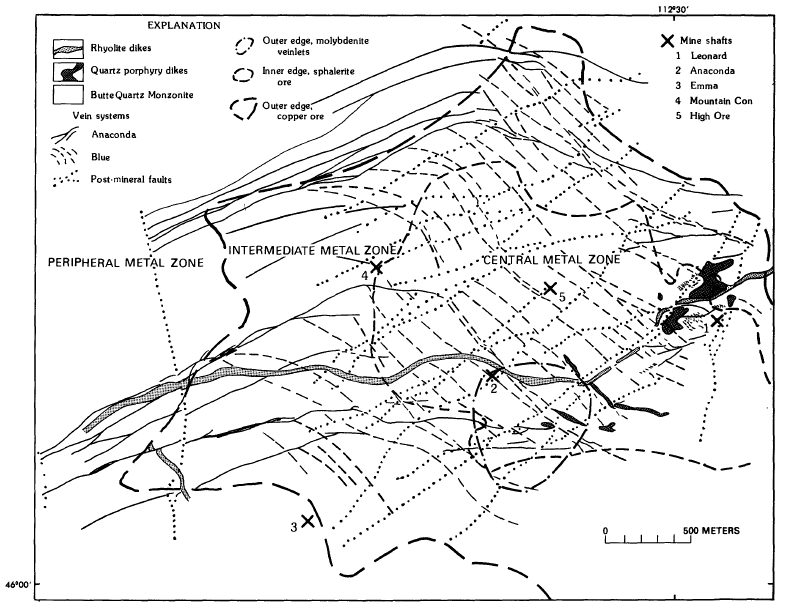
Mineral zones

== Photos ==
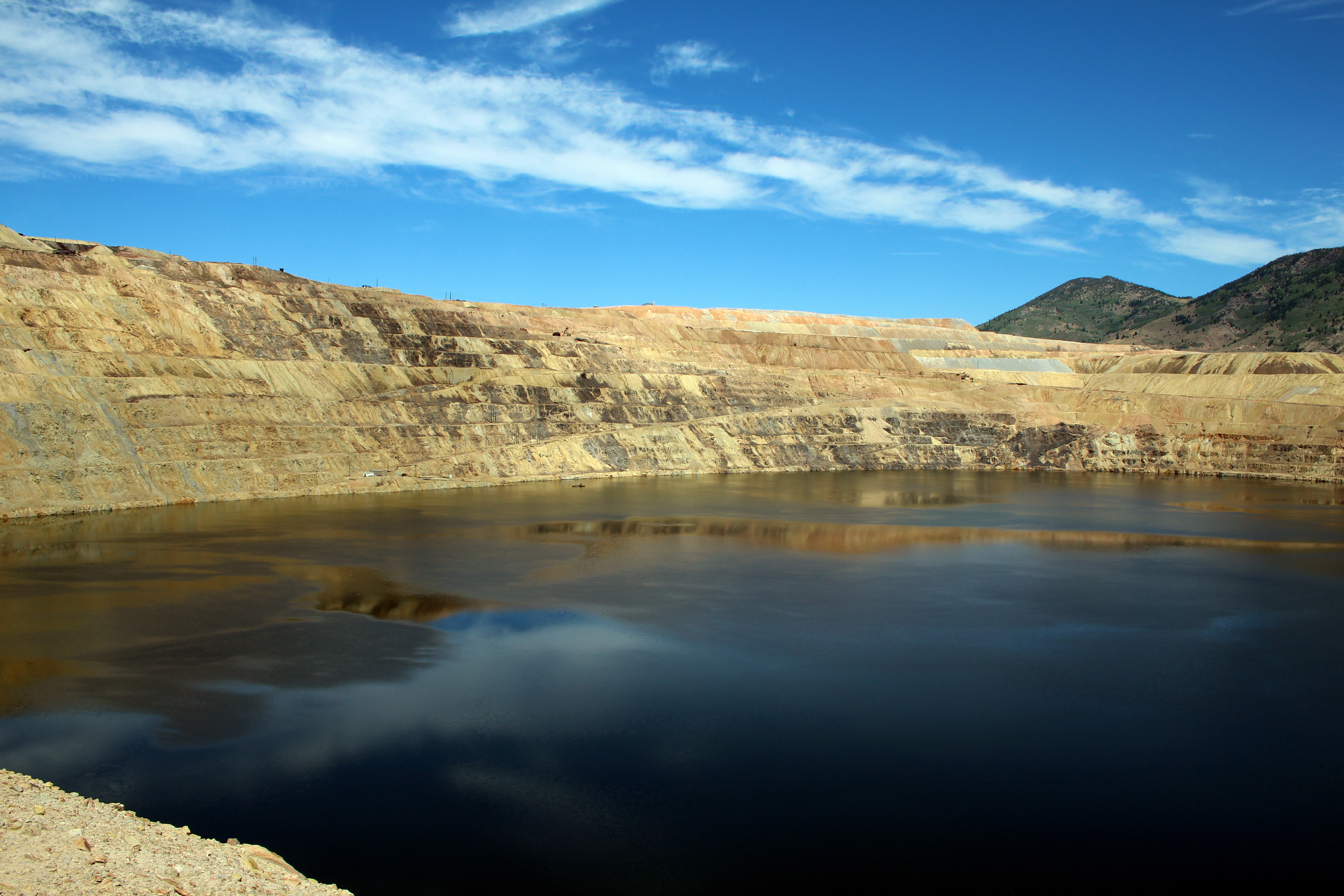
The Berkeley Pit mine in Butte Montana.

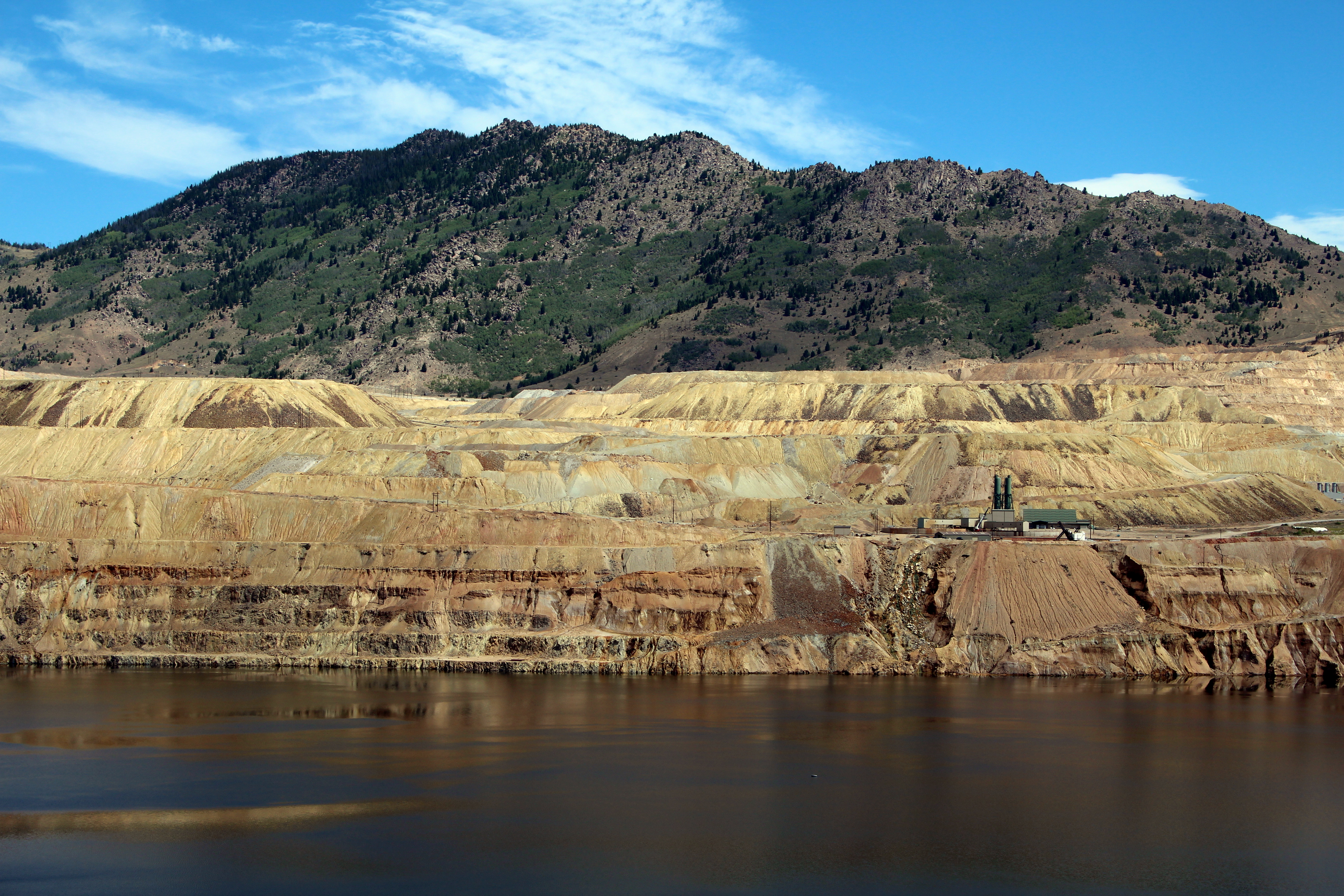
The Berkeley Pit mine in Butte Montana.

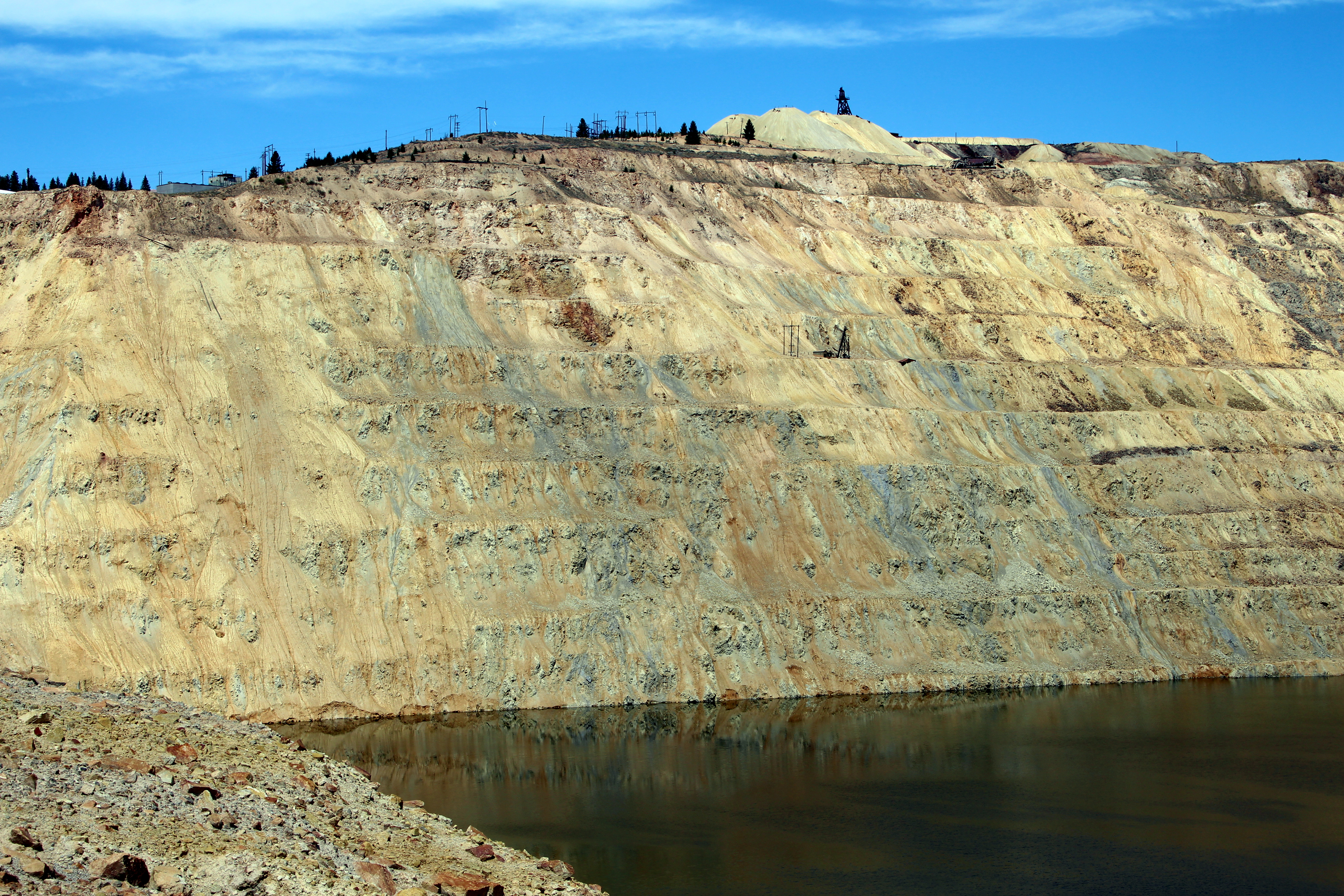
The Berkeley Pit mine in Butte Montana.

== See also ==
- Auditor (dog)
- Chemocline
- Dark Money
- List of Superfund sites in Montana
- Water pollution in the United States
- Bingham Canyon Mine (in Utah)
