= Dicarbonyltris(triphenylphosphine)ruthenium(0) =

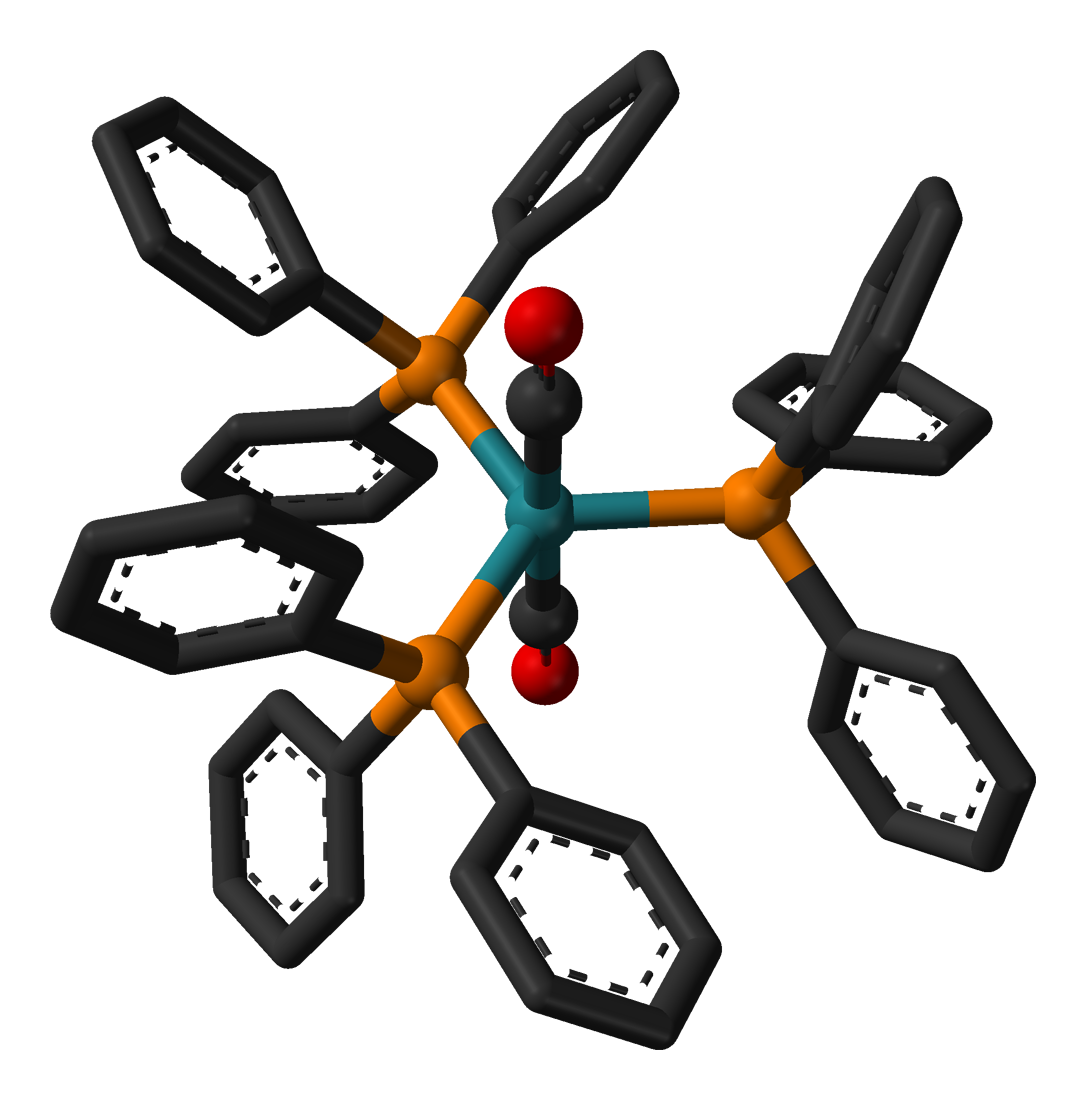

Names
- IUPAC names (TBPY-5-22)-dicarbonyltris (triphenylphosphane)ruthenium(0)

Identifiers
| CAS Number | 35880-54-7 |
| 3D model (JSmol) | Interactive image |
| ChemSpider | 9117254 |
| PubChem CID | 10942026 |
- InChI: InChI=1S/3C18H15P.2CO.Ru/c3*1-4-10-16(11-5-1)19(17-12-6-2-7-13-17)18-14-8-3-9-15-18;2*1-2;/h3*1-15H;;; Key: VBLLGXDCYTWKHI-UHFFFAOYSA-N
- SMILES: [O+]#C[Ru-5](C#[O+])([P+](c1ccccc1)(c2ccccc2)c3ccccc3)([P+](c1ccccc1)(c2ccccc2)c3ccccc3)[P+](c1ccccc1)(c2ccccc2)c3ccccc3

Properties
| Chemical formula | C_{56}H_{45}O_{2}P_{3}Ru |
| Molar mass | 943.97 g·mol^{−1} |
| Appearance | pale yellow solid |
| Solubility in water | insoluble |
- Except where otherwise noted, data are given for materials in their standard state (at 25 °C [77 °F], 100 kPa). verify (what is ?) Infobox references

Dicarbonyltris(triphenylphosphine)ruthenium(0) or Roper's complex is a ruthenium metal carbonyl. In it, two carbon monoxide ligands and three triphenylphosphine ligands are coordinated to a central ruthenium(0) center.

In solution, this compound readily dissociates one of the three phosphine ligands, thereby generating a reactive 16-electron complex that binds or oxidatively adds a variety of substrates such as alkynes, olefins, dihydrogen, and dioxygen. The compound has a trigonal bipyramidal molecular geometry and, in solution, exists as a mixture of two isomers that rapidly interconvert. The complex is air stable as a solid, but its solutions oxygenate in air to afford Ru(CO)_{2}(PPh_{3})_{2}(η^{2}-O_{2}).

== Preparation ==
The compound can be prepared by magnesium reduction of the corresponding ruthenium(II) dichloride complex in the presence of an excess of phosphine. The 16-electron intermediate can actually be isolated.

Ru(CO)_{2}Cl_{2}(PPh_{3})_{2} + Mg + PPh_{3} → Ru(CO)_{2}(PPh_{3})_{3} + MgCl_{2}

An improved base-promoted method involves the reduction of a ruthenium(II) carbonyl chloride with base in the presence of excess phosphine. The overall reaction for this one-pot synthesis is:

Ru(CO)_{3}Cl_{2}(thf) + 3 PPh_{3} + 4 [NEt_{4}]OH → Ru(CO)_{2}(PPh_{3})_{2} + [NEt_{4}]_{2}[CO_{3}] + 2 [NEt_{4}]Cl + 2H_{2}O + thf

The first step in this sequence is the formation of a metallocarboxylate by nucleophilic attack of hydroxide anion on a CO ligand to form a formate anion:

Ru(CO)_{3}Cl_{2}(thf) + [NEt_{4}]OH → [NEt_{4}][Ru(CO)_{2}(COOH)Cl_{2}(thf)]

Next solvated tetrahydrofuran is replaced by phosphine:

[NEt_{4}][Ru(CO)_{2}(COOH)Cl_{2}(thf)] + PPh_{3} → [NEt_{4}][Ru(CO)_{2}(COOH)Cl_{2}(PPh_{3})] + thf

Next the formate ligand is deprotonated again by hydroxide:

[NEt_{4}][Ru(CO)_{2}(COOH)Cl_{2}(PPh_{3})] + [NEt_{4}]OH → [NEt_{4}]_{2}[Ru(CO)_{2}(COO)Cl_{2}(PPh_{3})] + H_{2}O

These three reactions mean that carbon monoxide has been oxidized to carbon dioxide with the concomitant reduction of Ru(II) to Ru(0). Finally, the two remaining chloride ligands are replaced by two more phosphine groups and the carbon dioxide leaves:

[NEt_{4}]_{2}[Ru(CO)(COO)Cl_{2}(PPh_{3})] + 2 PPh_{3} → Ru(CO)_{2}(PPh_{3})_{3} + CO_{2} + 2 [NEt_{4}]Cl

The generated carbon dioxide is trapped as [NEt_{4}]_{2}[CO_{3}].

== History ==
The complex was first reported by Warren R Roper and his coworkers in 1972 in an era where oxidative addition reactions to d^{8} metal complexes were first being systematically examined. Being zero-valent and carrying only two CO ligands, the complex is highly nucleophilic. Many of its reactions parallel those for Vaska's complex.

== Applications ==
The derivative Ru(CO)_{2}H_{2}(PPh_{3})_{2}, obtained by exposing the complex to hydrogen, is a catalyst in the Murai reaction between terminal alkenes and the ortho C-H position of a phenone.
