= Murai reaction =

Reaction in organic chemistry

In organic chemistry, the Murai reaction is an organic reaction that uses C-H activation to create a new C-C bond between a terminal or strained internal alkene and an aromatic compound using a ruthenium catalyst. The reaction, named after Shinji Murai, was first reported in 1993. While not the first example of C-H activation, the Murai reaction is notable for its high efficiency and scope. Previous examples of such hydroarylations required more forcing conditions and narrow scope.

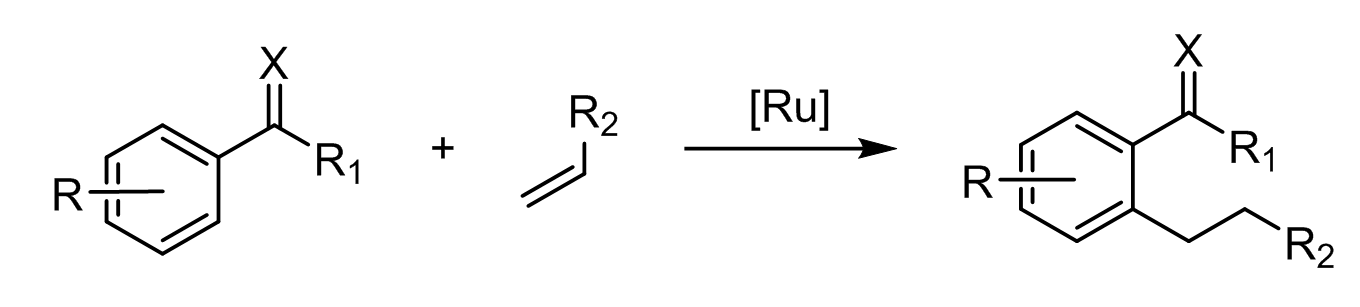
Murai reaction; X = directing group.

== Scope and regiochemistry ==
The reaction was initially demonstrated using a ketone as the directing group, but other functional groups have been reported, including esters, imines, nitriles, and imidates. Murai reactions have also been reported with disubstituted alkynes. Bidentate directing groups allow ortho alkylation of aromatic rings with α,β-unsaturated ketones, which typically are unreactive in Murai reactions.

Early examples of the reaction suffered from side products of alkylation at both ortho positions. This problem can be partially solved using an ortho methyl blocking group. Unfortunately, with ortho methyl groups both the rate and generality of the reaction are reduced. Substituents at the meta position influence regioselectivity. The reaction preferentially adds at the least sterically hindered ortho position, except when there is a meta group capable of coordinating with the Ru catalyst. Methoxyacetophenones show preferential reaction at the more hindered position.

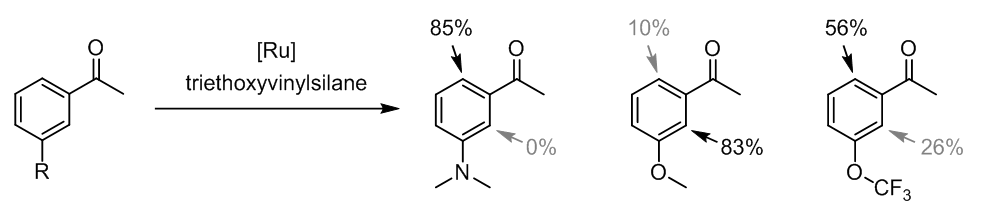
Effect of m-substituents on regioselectivity. Percentages are isolated yields of substitution at the indicated position.

== Mechanism ==
A variety of Ru catalysts catalyze the Murai reaction, including RuH_{2}(CO)(PPh_{3})_{3}, RuH_{2}(PPh_{3})_{4}, Ru(CO)_{2}(PPh_{3})_{3}, and Ru_{3}(CO)_{12}.

=== Ru(0) catalysts ===
A detailed mechanism for the Murai reaction has not been elucidated. Experimental and computational studies give evidence for at least two different mechanisms, depending on the catalyst. For catalysts such as [Ru(H)_{2}(CO)(PR_{3})_{3}] which are active as Ru^{0}, a combination of computational density functional studies and experimental evidence has resulted in the following proposed mechanism:

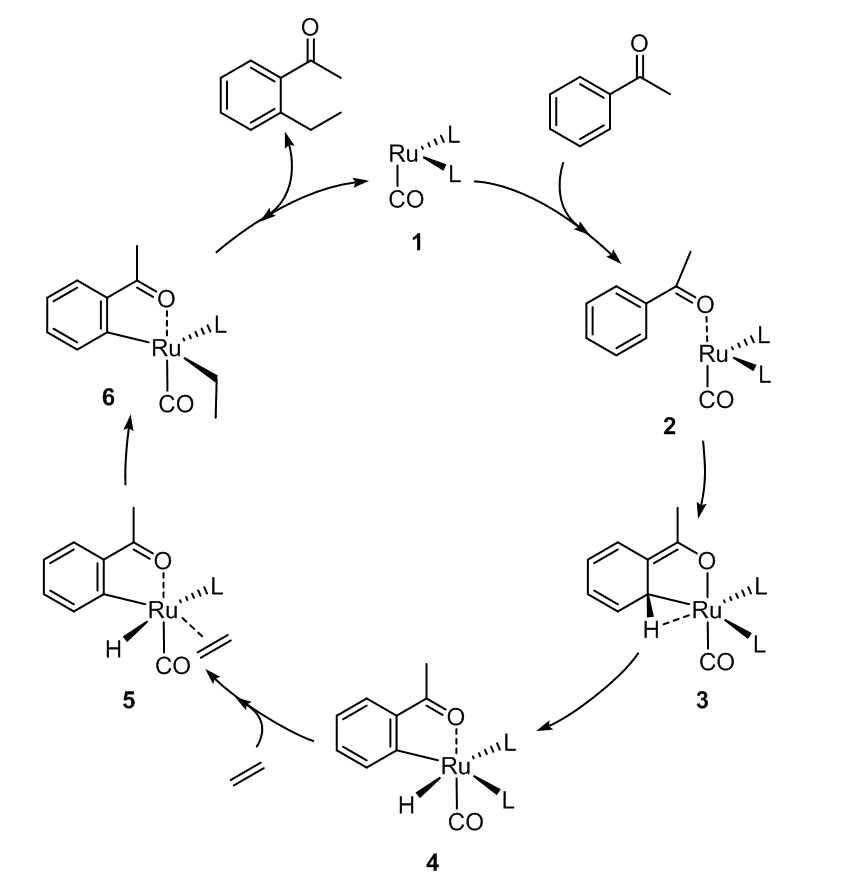
Proposed mechanism for the reaction of ethene and acetophenone (L = PR_{3}). Some spectator ligands on Ru are omitted.

It is proposed that at high temperatures RuH_{2}(CO)(PPh_{3})_{3} converts to an unsaturated Ru(CO)(PPh_{3})_{n} species. The catalytic cycle is proposed to begin with coordination of the ketone followed by oxidative addition of a C-H bond. The resulting five-coordinated metallocycle is stabilized by an agostic interaction. The C-C bond formation is the rate limiting step.

=== Ru(II) catalysts ===
The complex [Ru(o-C_{6}H_{4}PPh_{2})(H)(CO)(PPh_{3})_{2}] catalyzes the Murai reaction at room temperature. For [Ru(H)_{2}(H_{2})_{2}(PR_{3})_{2}], the active complex is [Ru(H)_{2}(PR_{3})_{2}].

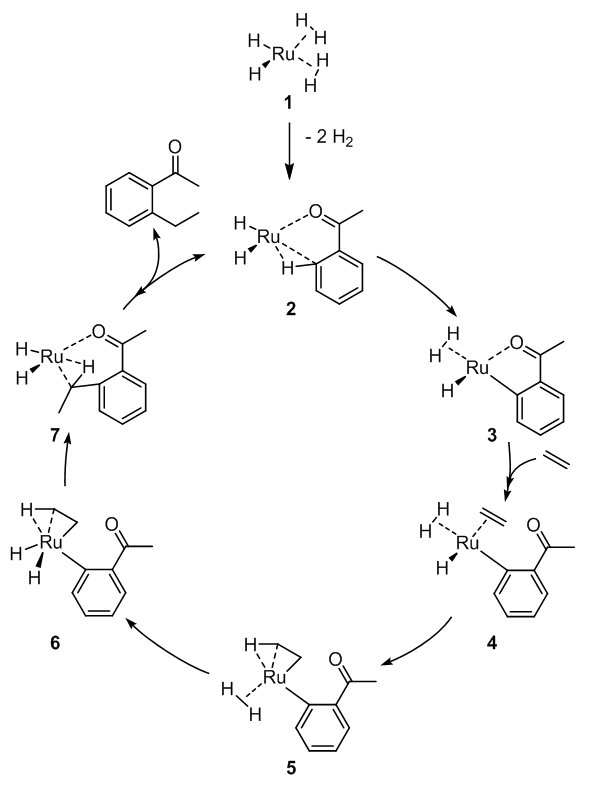
Mechanism proposed for the reaction acetophenone and ethylene as catalyzed by [Ru(H)_{2}(H_{2})_{2}(PR_{3})_{2}]. Spectator ligands (PMe_{3}) omitted for clarity.

After the active form of the ruthenium catalyst complex is generated from 1, acetophenone coordinates to the complex via its carbonyl oxygen and agostically via its ortho C-H bond (2). As in the Ru^{0} proposed mechanism, this agostic interaction leads to the oxidative addition of the ortho C-H. Reductive elimination releases H_{2}, which remains coordinated, giving complex 3. Coordination of ethylene and decoordination of the ketone results in complex 4 which then undergoes migratory insertion of ethylene into the hydride to give 5. Following oxidative addition of H_{2} (6), the complex reductively eliminates the product to give the product agostically bound to the complex. Coordination of another acetophenone molecule regenerates complex 2.
