= Berkeleydione =

Names
- Preferred IUPAC name Methyl (5aS,7R,9S,11R,11aS)-9-hydroxy-1,1,5,7,9,11a-hexamethyl-14-methylidene-3,8,10-trioxo-3,4,5a,6,7,8,9,10,11a,12-decahydro-7,11-methanocycloocta[4,5]cyclohepta[1,2-c]pyran-11(1H)-carboxylate

Identifiers
3D model (JSmol)	Interactive image
ChEBI	CHEBI:69021
ChEMBL	ChEMBL400514
ChemSpider	10193089
PubChem CID	21580417
CompTox Dashboard (EPA)	DTXSID001045475
- InChI: InChI=1S/C26H32O7/c1-13-15-11-18(27)33-22(3,4)16(15)9-10-24(6)17(13)12-23(5)14(2)26(24,21(30)32-8)20(29)25(7,31)19(23)28/h9,17,31H,2,10-12H2,1,3-8H3/t17-,23+,24-,25-,26-/m0/s1 Key: RBGYOLFHIDJTOX-VMXKAMJHSA-N; InChI=1/C26H32O7/c1-13-15-11-18(27)33-22(3,4)16(15)9-10-24(6)17(13)12-23(5)14(2)26(24,21(30)32-8)20(29)25(7,31)19(23)28/h9,17,31H,2,10-12H2,1,3-8H3/t17-,23+,24-,25-,26-/m0/s1 Key: RBGYOLFHIDJTOX-VMXKAMJHBZ
- SMILES: CC1=C2CC(=O)OC(C2=CC[C@]3([C@H]1C[C@@]4(C(=C)[C@]3(C(=O)[C@@](C4=O)(C)O)C(=O)OC)C)C)(C)C

Properties
Chemical formula	C_{26}H_{32}O_{7}
Molar mass	456.535 g·mol^{−1}
- Except where otherwise noted, data are given for materials in their standard state (at 25 °C [77 °F], 100 kPa). Infobox references

Berkeleydione is a chemical compound isolated from a Penicillium species that has in vitro activity in a cancer cell line. It was first discovered in fungal species which evolved to live in an acidic lake at Berkeley Pit. It is a precursor to several other fungal meroterpenoids, such as paraherquonin and the berkeleyacetals, miniolutelides, and dhilirolides.
