= Jin-Quan Yu =

Chinese-American organic chemist

- 余金权
- Born: January 10, 1966 (age 60); Zhejiang, China
- Citizenship: United States, United Kingdom
- Education: University of Cambridge Ph.D. (1999) Guangzhou Institute of Chemistry M.Sc. (1990) East China Normal University B.Sc. (1987)
- Known for: Meta-selective C–H functionalization
- Scientific career
- Fields: Organic Chemistry, Organometallic chemistry, Carbon–hydrogen bond activation, Enantioselective synthesis
- Workplaces: Scripps Research (2007-present) Brandeis University (2004-2007) University of Cambridge (2003-2004)
- Doctoral advisor: Jonathan B. Spencer
- Other academic advisors: E. J. Corey
- Website: www.scripps.edu/yu/

Jin-Quan Yu (simplified Chinese: 余金权; traditional Chinese: 余金權; pinyin: Yú Jīn-quán) is a Chinese-born American chemist. He is the Frank and Bertha Hupp Professor of Chemistry at Scripps Research, where he also holds the Bristol Myers Squibb Endowed Chair in Chemistry. He is a 2016 recipient of the MacArthur Fellowship, and is a member of the American Academy of Arts and Sciences, American Association for the Advancement of Science, and the Royal Society of Chemistry. Yu is a leader in the development of C–H bond activation reactions in organic chemistry, and has reported many C–H activation reactions that could be applicable towards the synthesis of drug molecules and other biologically active compounds. He also co-founded Vividion Therapeutics in 2016 with fellow Scripps chemists Benjamin Cravatt and Phil Baran, and is a member of the scientific advisory board of Chemveda Life Sciences.

== Early life and education ==
Yu was born on January 10, 1966, in Zhejiang, China. He received his B.Sc. in chemistry at East China Normal University in 1987. Yu then went on to the Guangzhou Institute of Chemistry, Chinese Academy of Sciences where he worked on heterogeneous reactions of terpenes with zeolite materials with Prof. Shu-De Xiao, obtaining his M.Sc. in 1990. He remained at the Guangzhou Institute of Chemistry for four years as a research associate.

In 1994, Yu moved to the United Kingdom to pursue graduate studies at the University of Cambridge with Prof. Jonathan B. Spencer. At Cambridge, he studied biosynthesis and the mechanistic details of the hydrometallation step in asymmetric hydrogenation reactions with heterogeneous and homogeneous catalysts, among the twenty-one papers he co-authored with Spencer. Yu graduated with his Ph.D. in 1999.

Between 1999 and 2001, Yu worked as a Junior Research Fellow of St John's College, Cambridge. From 2001-2002, Yu worked as a postdoctoral fellow at Harvard University in the laboratory of Prof. E. J. Corey on selective palladium-catalyzed allylic oxidation reactions. Yu returned to Cambridge in 2002 and continued in his position as a Junior Research Fellow.

== Independent career ==
Yu was awarded a Royal Society University Research Fellowship in 2003, which allowed him to start his independent research towards the development of asymmetric C–H activation reactions. In 2004, he moved to Brandeis University as an assistant professor of chemistry. He moved to The Scripps Research Institute as an associate professor in 2007 and was promoted to full professor in 2010. In 2012, he was appointed the Frank and Bertha Hupp Professor of Chemistry.

== Research ==
Yu is an organic synthetic chemist who develops of new methods for functionalizing carbon-hydrogen (C–H) bonds, or C–H activation. A longstanding goal in organic synthesis, C–H activation would allow for inert, unreactive C–H bonds to be replaced with bonds to functional groups that can alter a molecule's reactivity and properties. One strategy to achieve selective C–H activation under mild conditions is to use metal-based catalysts that are guided to the targeted C–H bond by nearby directing functional groups. These directing groups often must be removed once the new functional group has been appended to the molecule. This style of C–H activation methodology could greatly simplify the synthesis of pharmaceutical drug molecules, agrochemicals, and natural products.

Yu has contributed metal palladium-catalyzed C-H bond activation promoted by "weak coordination," that is by directing group effects. Other areas of interest are the development of remote C-H bond activation, for example at the meta-position to a directing group. Since many drugs and natural products are chiral, Yu has also developed important asymmetric C-H bond activation reactions, including those templated by modified amino acids that can act as transient, chiral directing groups.

== Awards and memberships ==
Yu is the recipient of numerous awards and honors for his work in organic chemistry reaction development, including a MacArthur Fellowship (also known as a "Genius Grant") in 2016. He was elected a member of the American Academy of Arts and Sciences in 2019, a fellow of the American Association for the Advancement of Science and the Royal Society of Chemistry in 2012. In 2013, he received the Raymond and Beverly Sackler Prize in the Physical Sciences.

Yu received the Pedler Award from the Royal Society of Chemistry in 2016, and the Elias J. Corey Award for Outstanding Original Contribution in Organic Synthesis by a Young Investigator from the American Chemical Society. In 2012, he was awarded the Mukaiyama Award from the Japanese Society of Organic Synthesis, the ACS Cope Scholar Award, and the Bristol-Myers Squibb Award. His honors also include the Novartis Early Career Award in Organic Chemistry (2011), Eli Lilly Grantee Award (2008), Amgen Young Investigator's Award (2008), and Sloan Research Fellowship (2008). In 2026, Yu was elected to the National Academy of Sciences and elected a Fellow of the Royal Society.

== Personal life ==
Yu has a daughter, Anna, and a son, Tony.
