= Auditor (dog) =

American feral dog (died 2003)

Auditor (also The Auditor; before 1986 – November 19, 2003) was a feral dog who lived on Montana Resources properties surrounding the Berkeley Pit, an open pit copper mine and Superfund site in Butte, Montana. First seen at the mine in 1986, the shaggy dog typically avoided human contact. He was given the name "Auditor" because he would appear when least expected. Auditor appeared to be a Puli due to his long, corded coat resembling dreadlocks, typical of that breed. Mine employees provided food, water and shelter for Auditor, who would wander the mine, often disappearing for weeks at a time, interacting with people as little as possible. After he began to show signs of arthritis, aspirin was added to his food. Auditor died on November 19, 2003, at least 17 years old.

Holly Peterson, an environmental engineer at Montana Tech, analyzed hair samples taken from Auditor near the end of his life; she found elevated levels of "nearly every element imaginable," with a level of arsenic 128 times that normally found in pet dog hair. Peterson's study was published in the Intermountain Journal of Sciences in June 2006. Following publicity about Auditor, Peterson organized the installation of bronze statues of Auditor by Andrea Wilkinson at three locations in Butte, establishing the Auditor Foundation to memorialize the dog.

== See also ==
- List of individual dogs
