= Di-tert-butylzinc =

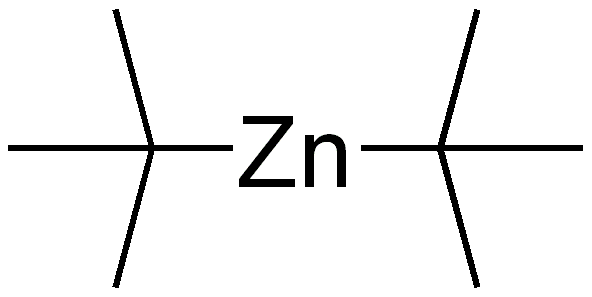

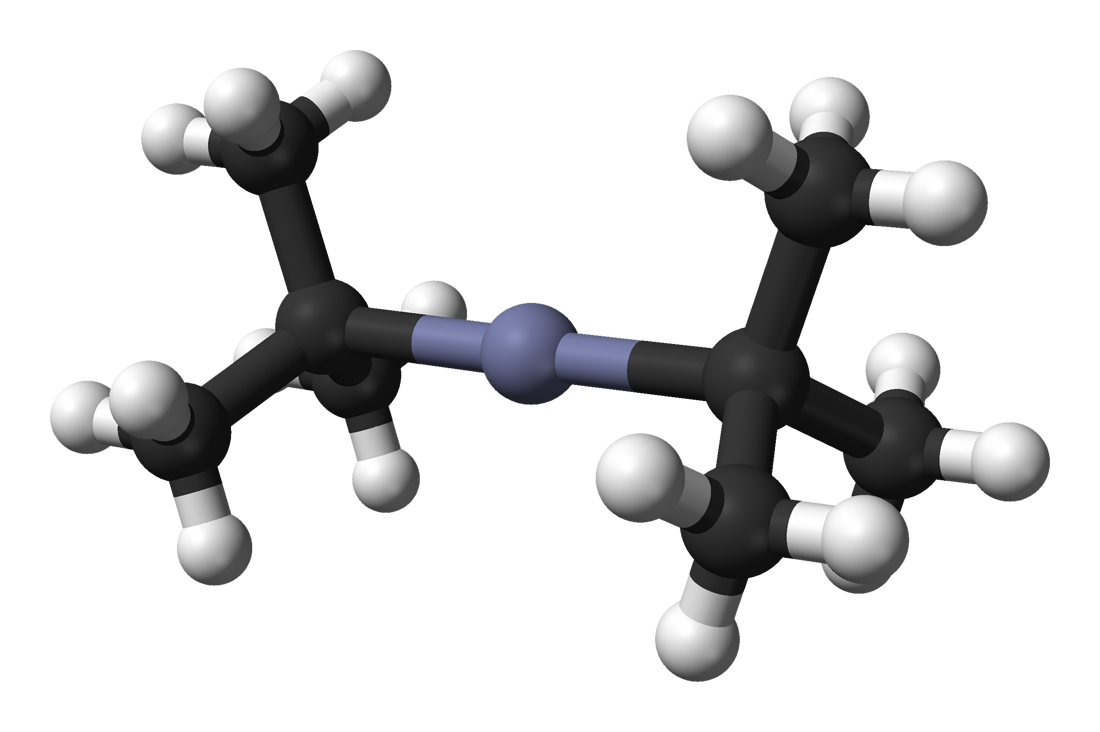

Names
- IUPAC name Bis(dimethylethyl)zinc
- Other names Di-tert-butylzinc

Identifiers
CAS Number	16636-96-7
3D model (JSmol)	Interactive image
ChemSpider	10750751
PubChem CID	545313
CompTox Dashboard (EPA)	DTXSID20337885
- InChI: InChI=1S/2C4H9.Zn/c2*1-4(2)3;/h2*1-3H3; Key: KYHHMFUFEIHUHB-UHFFFAOYSA-N; InChI=1/2C4H9.Zn/c2*1-4(2)3;/h2*1-3H3;/rC8H18Zn/c1-7(2,3)9-8(4,5)6/h1-6H3 Key: KYHHMFUFEIHUHB-UUODNYSZAB
- SMILES: CC(C)(C)[Zn]C(C)(C)C

Properties
Chemical formula	C_{8}H_{18}Zn
Molar mass	179.61 g·mol^{−1}
- Except where otherwise noted, data are given for materials in their standard state (at 25 °C [77 °F], 100 kPa). verify (what is ?) Infobox references

Di-tert-butylzinc is a compound with the formula ZnC_{8}H_{18}. This compound is used as a meta activating reagent in the syntheses of N,N-dimethyl-3-iodoaniline from N,N-dimethylaniline.

== Synthesis ==
Di-tert-butylzinc is obtained from the reaction between tert-butyllithium and zinc chloride.

2 (CH_{3})_{3}CLi + ZnCl_{2} → Zn(C(CH_{3})_{3})_{2} + 2 LiCl
