= Concerted metalation deprotonation =

Chemical reaction in organic chemistry

Concerted metalation–deprotonation (CMD) is a mechanistic pathway through which transition-metal catalyzed C–H activation reactions can take place. In a CMD pathway, the C–H bond of the substrate is cleaved and the new C–Metal bond forms through a single transition state. This process does not go through a metal hydride species that is bound to the cleaved hydrogen atom. Instead, a carboxylate or carbonate base deprotonates the substrate. The first proposal of a concerted metalation deprotonation pathway was by S. Winstein and T. G. Traylor in 1955 for the acetolysis of diphenylmercury. It was found to be the lowest energy transition state in a number of computational studies, was experimentally confirmed through NMR experiments, and has been hypothesized to occur in mechanistic studies.

While there are a number of different possible mechanisms for C–H activation, a CMD pathway is common for high valent, late transition metals like Pd^{II}, Rh^{III}, Ir^{III}, and Ru^{II}. The C–H bonds that have been found to undergo C–H activation through CMD include those that are aryl, alkyl, and alkenyl. Investigations into CMD paved the way for the development of many new C–H functionalization reactions, especially in the areas of direct arylation and alkylation by palladium and ruthenium.

== Mechanism ==
Mechanism of a CMD insertion into a C–H bond

CMD begins with a high valent, late transition metal like Pd^{II} that may or may not be bound to a carboxylate anion. In the initial stages, there is usually a coordination of the C–H bond with the metal to form a metal–hydrocarbon sigma complex. The computed transition state involves concerted partial formation of a carbon–metal bond and partial protonation of the carboxylate. At the same time, any anionic metal–carboxylate bond begins to break, as does the carbon–hydrogen bond that is being activated. Compared to other possible processes such as oxidative addition of the C–H bond to the metal, CMD is lower in energy in many cases. A transition state in which the carboxylate is bound to the metal can be referred to as either CMD or AMLA, which stands for "ambiphilic metal–ligand assistance," but the latter emphasizes that the carboxylate acts as a ligand during the transition state.

== History ==
In 1955, S. Winstein and T. G. Traylor published a study of the mechanism of acetolysis of organomercury compounds. They propose a series of possible mechanisms for the process, which they rule out through based on their kinetic data. A concerted metalation deprotonation is considered, and they are unable to rule it out through the data they collect.

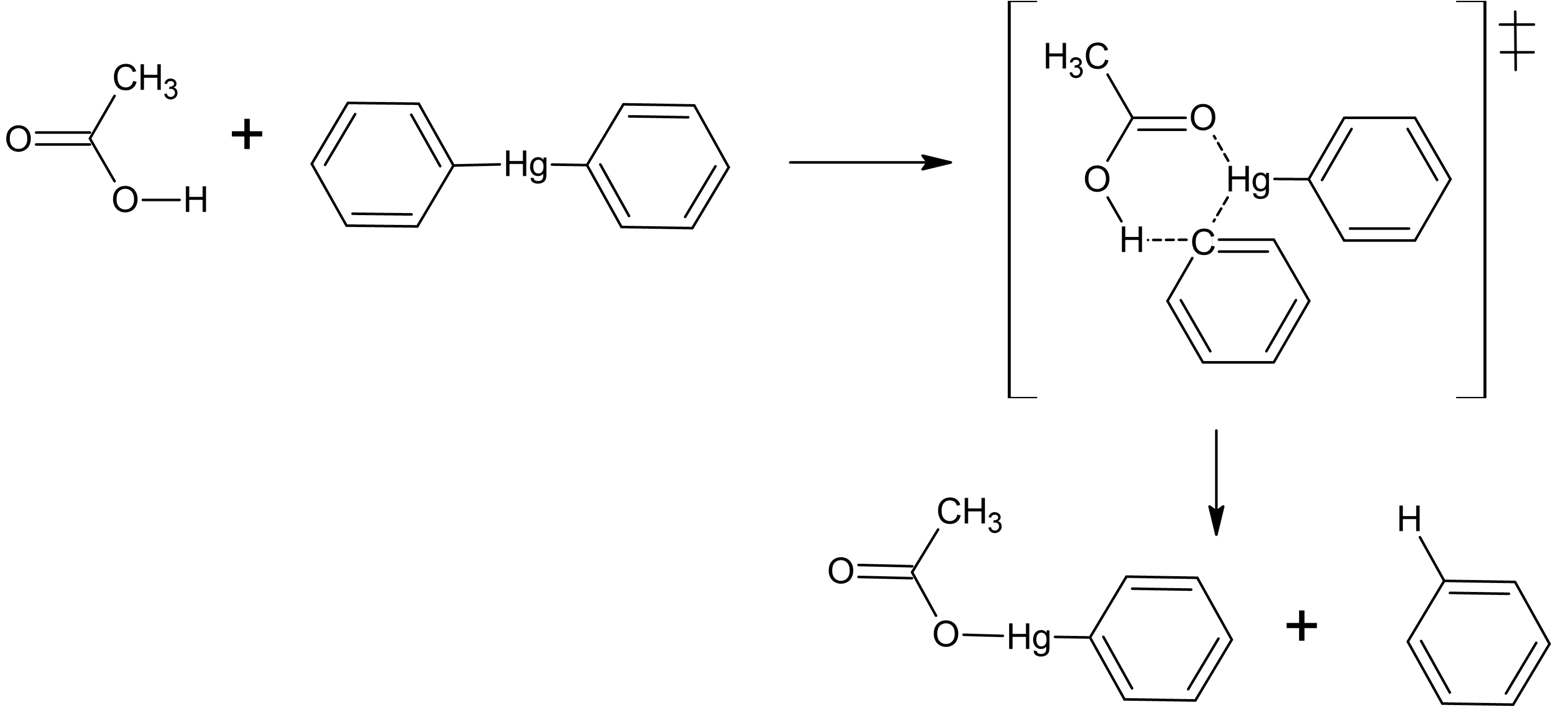

The metalation of organic C–H bonds was extended from mercury to palladium in 1968 by J. M. Davidson and C. Triggs who identified that palladium acetate reacts with benzene in perchloric acid and acetic acid to give biphenyl, palladium(0), and 2 equivalents of acetic acid through an organopalladium intermediate. Early mechanistic studies found that palladium acetate was the best palladium precatalyst due to the presence of the acetate ligand. Mechanistic investigation has been ongoing since these initial discoveries, and infrared spectroscopy on the picosecond–millisecond time scale was used in 2021 to observe the states involved in proton transfer from acetic acid to a metalated ligand, which is the microscopic reverse of a concerted metalation deprotonation process.

== Examples ==
Reaction systems that are less efficient or entirely inactive in the absence of carboxylate acids and bases are likely to occur through a concerted metalation protonation reaction pathway. An example of such a reaction with an sp^{3} C–H bond that was reported in 2007 by Keith Fagnou and coworkers is an intramolecular cyclization that uses a palladium catalyst.

sp3 C–H activation by CMD mechanism from Keith Fagnou and co-workers in 2007

A notable example of a reaction that is catalyzed by ruthenium in which directed metalation occurs through CMD was reported by Igor Larossa and coworkers in 2018. The ruthenium catalyst is functional group tolerant and enables the late stage synthesis of pharmaceutically relevant biaryls.

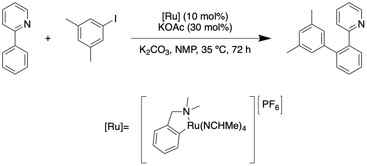
Example of directed arylation that occurs through concerted metalation deprotonation by Igor Larossa and coworkers in 2018

== Importance of carboxylate ==
Many C–H activation reactions, particularly those involving late transition metals, require carboxylate or carbonate bases. The need for this reaction component often suggests the occurrence of a CMD pathway. However, in order to be classified as CMD, the transition state does not need to involve the carboxylate as a ligand on the metal. Common sources of carboxylate include pivalate, acetate, and benzoate.

== Base Assisted Concerted Metalation Deprotonation (bCMD) ==
In C–H activation reactions that lack a deprotonating ligand on the metal catalyst, a base-assisted CMD pathway can operate via straightforward acid–base chemistry, as demonstrated by Ajitha through DFT studies. In this base-assisted CMD mechanism, while the metal center anchors (coordinates) the substrate, the C–H bond cleavage occurs via deprotonation by a suitable external base present in the reaction medium, rather than by a deprotonating ligand bound to the catalyst as proposed in Fagnou’s CMD pathway.

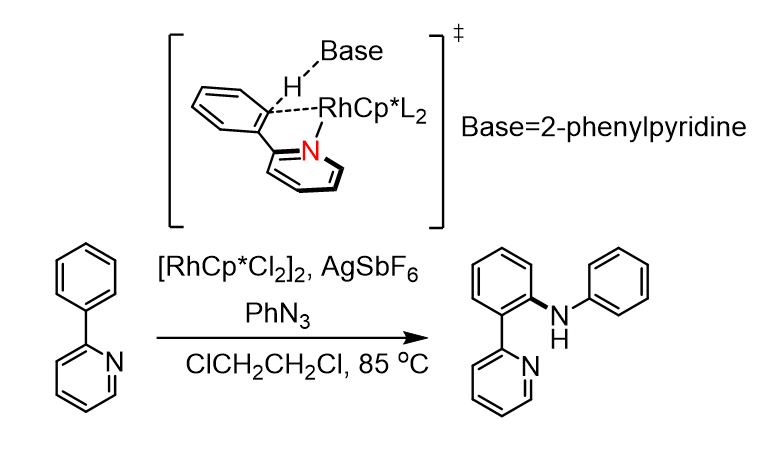
An external base, rather than a catalyst-bound deprotonating ligand, mediates C–H bond activation, while the metal center anchors the substrate from Manjaly J. Ajitha and co-workers in 2016

== Electrophilic Concerted Metalation Deprotonation (eCMD) ==
Canonical transition state of Fagnou’s CMD model (standard CMD)

Fagnou’s CMD model (“standard CMD”) was developed around a very specific reaction class, Palladium-catalyzed direct arylation reactions, which display site selectivity favoring more acidic C–H bonds. To predict the favored reactivity patterns (i. e., site selectivity) for a given metal complex with distinct transition state polarization, the concept of Electrophilic CMD (eCMD) was created by Brad P. Carrow.

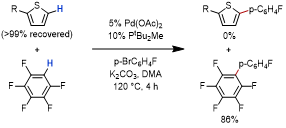
Competing experiment via Std. CMD reactions

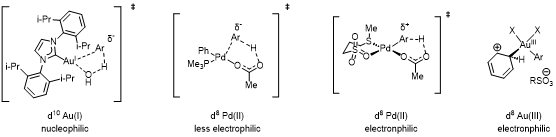
Metal complexes with distinct transition state polarization

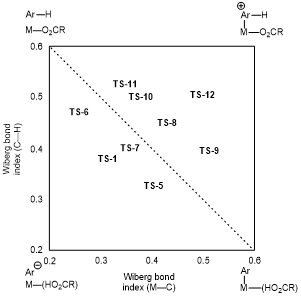
Expanded More O’Ferrall-Jencks (MOFJ) analysis of CMD-type transition states beyond the Pd(II) examples

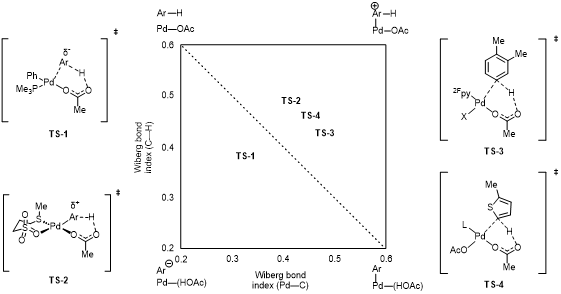
More O’Ferrall-Jencks (MOFJ) analysis for different d^{8}-Pd(II) complexes activating the C–H bond in a canonical electron-poor, neutral, or electron-rich substrate.

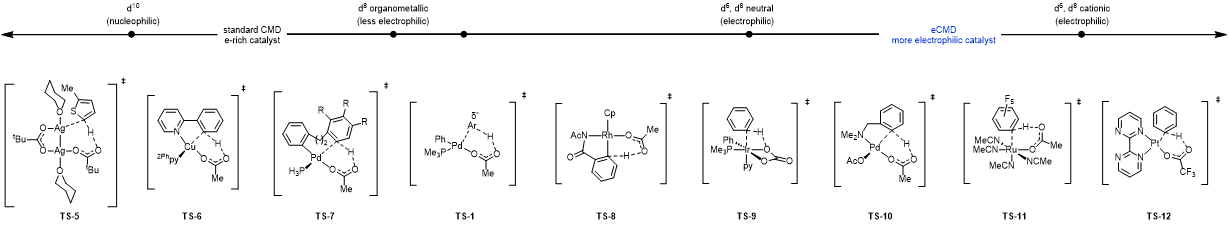
Expanded More O’Ferrall-Jencks (MOFJ) analysis of CMD-type transition states beyond the Pd(II) examples

Differences in transition state polarization between different Pd(II) species can be visualized in a More O’Ferrall-Jencks (MOFJ) plot for representative cases involving C–H cleavage in an electron-rich, neutral, or electron-poor (hetero)arene. eCMD has been proposed as a polarization-based term and model to describe complexes clustering in the right upper region of the MOFJ plot analysis. In this region, a build-up of partial positive charge on the ipso carbon at the transition state is indicated. However, the left lower region of MOFJ plot indicates intermediate levels of negative charge build-up on the ipso carbon for Fagnou’s CMD model. Considering their only difference in their structure that can account for this differing reactivity in otherwise similar six-membered C–H cleavage transition states is the identity of their spectator ligands, electron density is very likely to account for the different behavior. Thus, more metal complexes with different center metals (from d^{6} to d^{10}) and ligands were studied with different electron density. It was found that more e-rich (d^{10} and d^{8} metal with L-type ligands) metal complexes will undergoes a standard CMD while less e-rich (d^{6} and d^{8} metal with X-type ligands) metal complexes will conduct an eCMD transition state.

The eCMD transition state is characterized by metal carbon bonding that is more advanced than carbon hydrogen cleavage relative to the standard CMD transition state. Thus, more partial positive charge is expected to build-up on the substrate in the asynchronous eCMD transition state that gives rise to electrophilic reactivity patterns favoring more π-basic substrates or sites.
