= Berkelic acid =

Identifiers
CAS Number	905305-61-5
3D model (JSmol)	Interactive image
ChemSpider	28286696
PubChem CID	54612784
- InChI: InChI=1S/C29H40O9/c1-6-8-9-10-19-11-17-12-20(30)24(26(32)33)25-23(17)21(37-19)14-29(38-25)16(3)18(15-36-29)13-22(31)28(4,7-2)27(34)35-5/h12,16,18-19,21,30H,6-11,13-15H2,1-5H3,(H,32,33)/t16-,18+,19+,21-,28-,29-/m0/s1 Key: KUPCHRRTAPZASB-FZIMWOAESA-N; InChI=1/C29H40O9/c1-6-8-9-10-19-11-17-12-20(30)24(26(32)33)25-23(17)21(37-19)14-29(38-25)16(3)18(15-36-29)13-22(31)28(4,7-2)27(34)35-5/h12,16,18-19,21,30H,6-11,13-15H2,1-5H3,(H,32,33)/t16-,18+,19+,21-,28-,29-/m0/s1 Key: KUPCHRRTAPZASB-FZIMWOAEBA
- SMILES: CCCCC[C@@H]1Cc2cc(c(c3c2[C@@H](O1)C[C@]4(O3)[C@H]([C@@H](CO4)CC(=O)[C@](C)(CC)C(=O)OC)C)C(=O)O)O

Properties
Chemical formula	C_{29}H_{40}O_{9}
Molar mass	532.630 g·mol^{−1}
- Except where otherwise noted, data are given for materials in their standard state (at 25 °C [77 °F], 100 kPa). Infobox references

Berkelic acid is a fungal isolate with anticancer activity in vitro. It was first discovered in a fungal species which evolved to live in the Berkeley Pit.
