= Berkeleytrione =

Names
- Preferred IUPAC name Methyl (1R,6aS,7R,9S,11R,12aR,12bS)-1,9,10-trihydroxy-4,4,6a,9,11,12b-hexamethyl-3,8-dioxo-1,3,4,6,6a,8,9,10,11,12,12a,12b-dodecahydro-7,11-methanocycloocta[a]naphthalene-7(2H)-carboxylate

Identifiers
| 3D model (JSmol) | Interactive image |
| ChEBI | CHEBI:69022 |
| ChEMBL | ChEMBL252716 |
| ChemSpider | 10193090 |
| PubChem CID | 21580418 |
| CompTox Dashboard (EPA) | DTXSID301031469 |
- InChI: InChI=1S/C26H34O7/c1-13-22(4)12-15-23(5,26(13,20(31)33-8)19(30)25(7,32)18(22)29)10-9-14-21(2,3)16(27)11-17(28)24(14,15)6/h9,15,17,28,32H,1,10-12H2,2-8H3/t15-,17-,22-,23+,24-,25+,26+/m1/s1 Key: BNDPVNXDSQOTOY-OKCDOLPESA-N; InChI=1/C26H34O7/c1-13-22(4)12-15-23(5,26(13,20(31)33-8)19(30)25(7,32)18(22)29)10-9-14-21(2,3)16(27)11-17(28)24(14,15)6/h9,15,17,28,32H,1,10-12H2,2-8H3/t15-,17-,22-,23+,24-,25+,26+/m1/s1 Key: BNDPVNXDSQOTOY-OKCDOLPEBK
- SMILES: C[C@]12CC=C3[C@]([C@@H]1C[C@@]4(C(=C)[C@]2(C(=O)[C@@](C4=O)(C)O)C(=O)OC)C)([C@@H](CC(=O)C3(C)C)O)C

Properties
| Chemical formula | C_{26}H_{34}O_{7} |
| Molar mass | 458.551 g·mol^{−1} |
- Except where otherwise noted, data are given for materials in their standard state (at 25 °C [77 °F], 100 kPa). Infobox references

Berkeleytrione is a bio-active fungal isolate from the Berkeley Pit.
