= Directing group =

Molecular substituent that facilitates reactions by interacting with a reagent

In organic chemistry, a directing group (DG) is a substituent on a molecule or ion that facilitates reactions by interacting with a reagent. The term is usually applied to C–H activation of hydrocarbons, where it is defined as a "coordinating moiety (an 'internal ligand'), which directs a metal catalyst into the proximity of a certain C–H bond." In a well known example, the ketone group (C=O) in acetophenone is the DG in the Murai reaction.

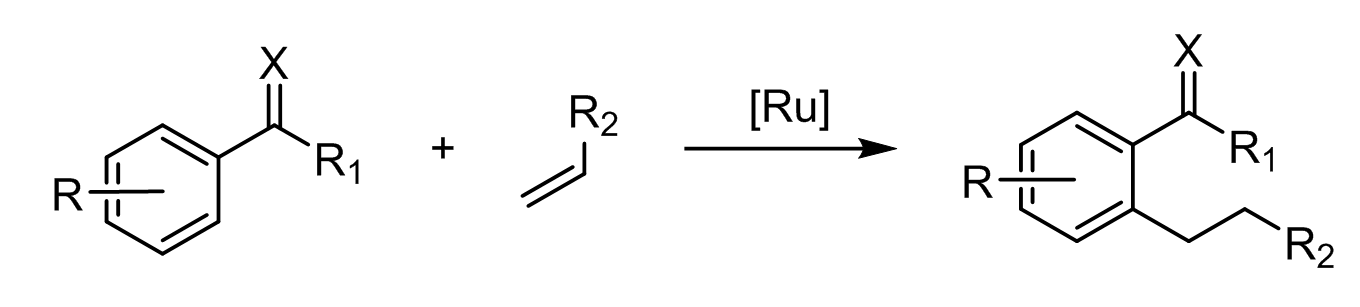
Murai reaction. X = directing group.

The Murai reaction is related to directed ortho metalation, a reaction is typically applied to the lithiation of substituted aromatic rings.

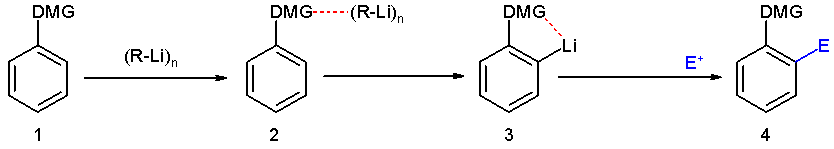
Directed ortho metalation

A wide variety of functional groups can serve as directing groups.

== Transient directing groups ==
Since directing groups are ligands, their effectiveness correlates with their affinities for metals. Common functional groups such as ketones usually are only weak ligands and thus often are poor DGs. This problem is solved by the use of a transient directing group. Transient DGs reversibly convert weak DGs (e.g., ketones) into strong DG's (e.g., imines) via a Schiff base condensation. Subsequent to serving their role as DGs, the imine can hydrolyze, regenerating the ketone and amine.

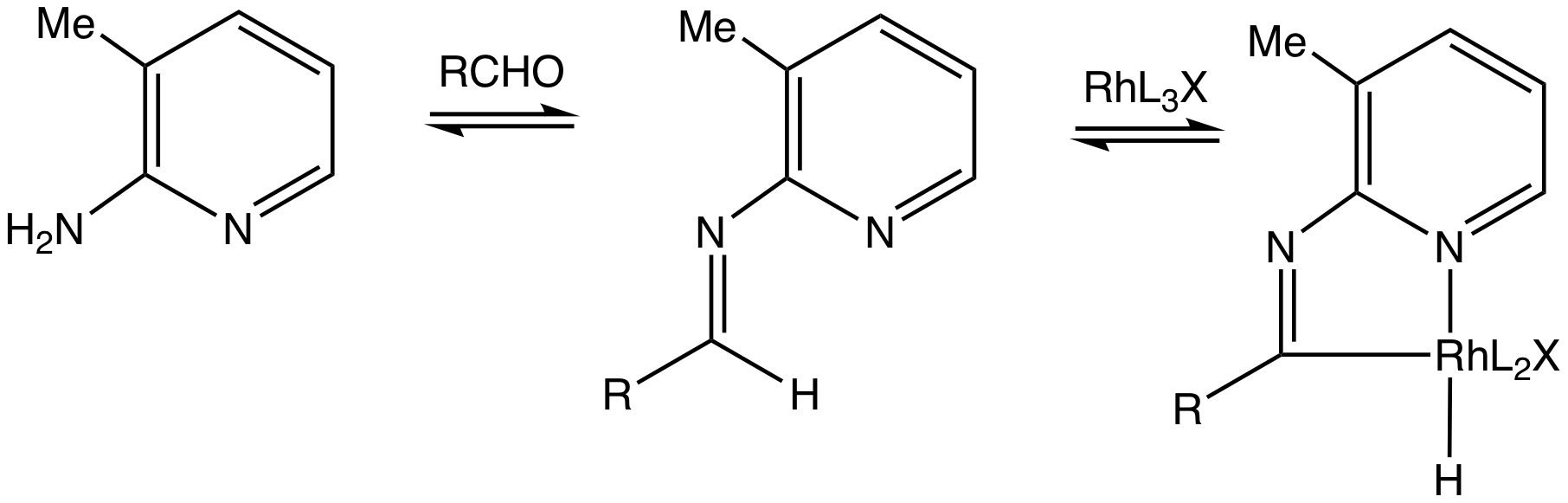
Activation of a C–H bond via transient directing group provided by an aminopyridine
