= Methane functionalization =

Process of converting methane to another molecule

Methane functionalization is the process of converting methane in its gaseous state to another molecule with a functional group, typically methanol or acetic acid, through the use of transition metal catalysts.

In the realm of carbon–hydrogen bond activation and functionalization (C−H activation/functionalization), many recent efforts have been made in order to catalytically functionalize the C−H bonds in methane. The large abundance of methane in natural gas or shale gas deposits presents a large potential for its use as a feedstock in modern chemistry. However, given its gaseous natural state, it is quite difficult to transport economically. Its ideal use would be as a raw starting material for methanol or acetic acid synthesis, with plants built at the source to eliminate the issue of transportation. Methanol, in particular, would be of great use as a potential fuel source, and many efforts have been applied to researching the feasibilities of a methanol economy.

The challenges of C−H activation and functionalization present themselves when several factors are taken into consideration. Firstly, the C−H bond is extremely inert and non-polar, with a high bond dissociation energy, making methane a relatively unreactive starting material. Secondly, any products formed from methane would likely be more reactive than the starting product, which would be detrimental to the selectivity and yield of the reaction.

The difference between C−H activation and functionalization	Figure 1

The main strategy currently used to increase the reactivity of methane uses transition metal complexes to activate the carbon–hydrogen bonds. In a typical C−H activation mechanism, a transition metal catalyst coordinates to the C−H bond to cleave it, and convert it into a bond with a lower bond dissociation energy. By doing so, the product can be used in further downstream reactions, since it will usually have a new functional group attached to the carbon. It is also important to note the difference between the terms "activation" and "functionalization," since both terms are often used interchangeably, but should be held distinct from each other. Activation refers to the coordination of a metal center to the C−H bond, whereas functionalization occurs when the coordinated metal complex is further reacted with a group "X" to result in the functionalized product.

== Methane activation ==
The four most common methods of transition metal catalyzed methane activation are the Shilov system, sigma-bond metathesis, oxidative addition, and 1,2 addition reactions.

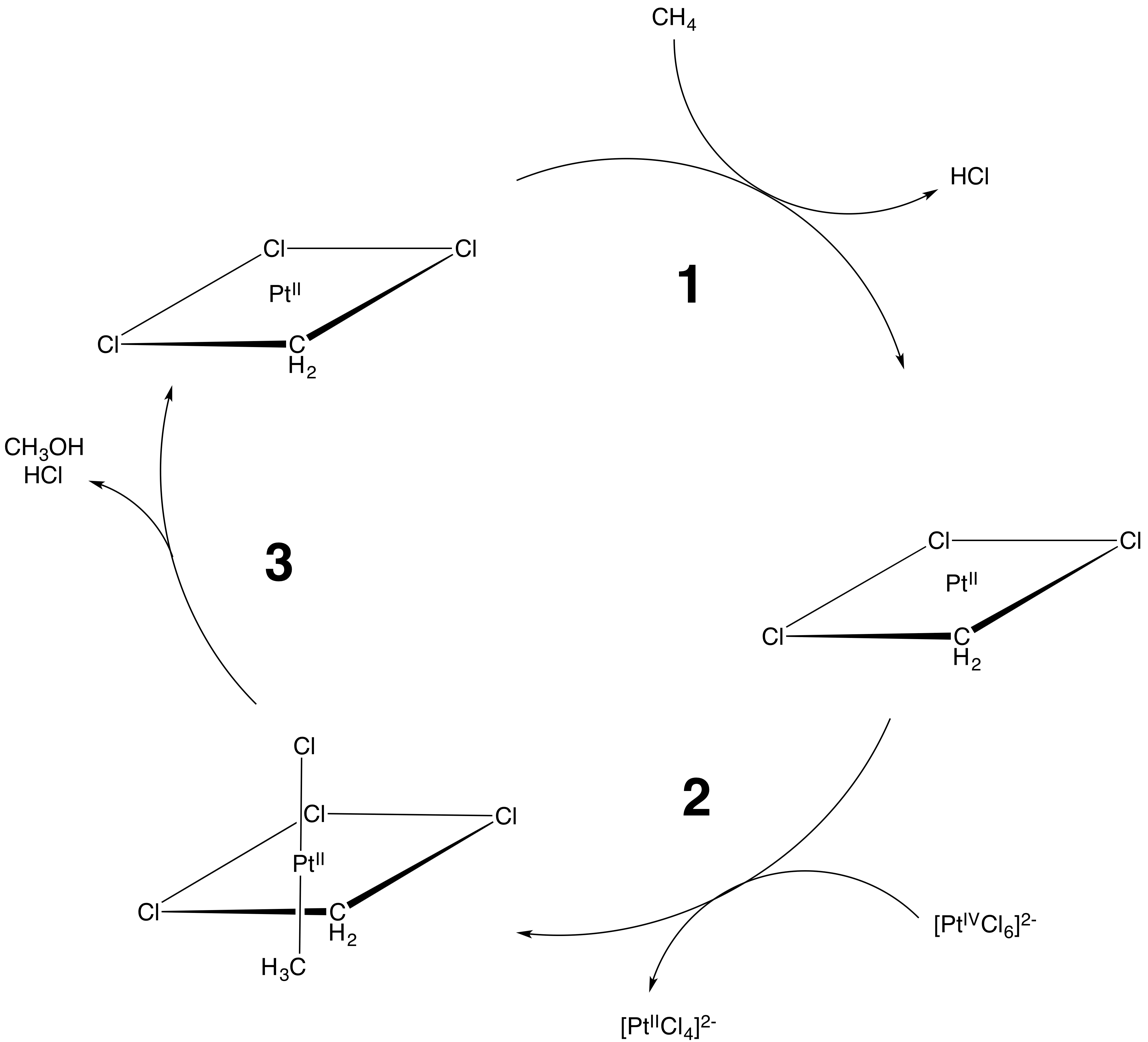
The mechanism for the Shilov system / (Figure 3)

The Shilov system involves platinum based complexes to produce metal alkyls. It was first discovered when a hydrogen-deuterium exchanged was observed in a deuterated solution with the platinum tetrachloride anion. Shilov et al. then was able to catalytically convert methane into methanol or methyl chloride when a Pt(IV) salt was used as a stoichiometric oxidant. The process is simplified down into three main steps: (1) C−H activation, (2) a redox reaction to form an octahedral intermediate, followed by (3) the formation of the carbon-oxygen bond to form methanol (Figure 3).

$$\begin{matrix}{}\\ \ce{{CH4} + {PtCl6^{2-}} + H2O(Cl^-) ->[\ce{K2PtCl4}][\ce{H2O,\ 120^\circ C}] {CH3OH(CH3Cl)} + {PtCl4^{2-}} + 2HCl}\\{} \end{matrix}$$	Figure 2

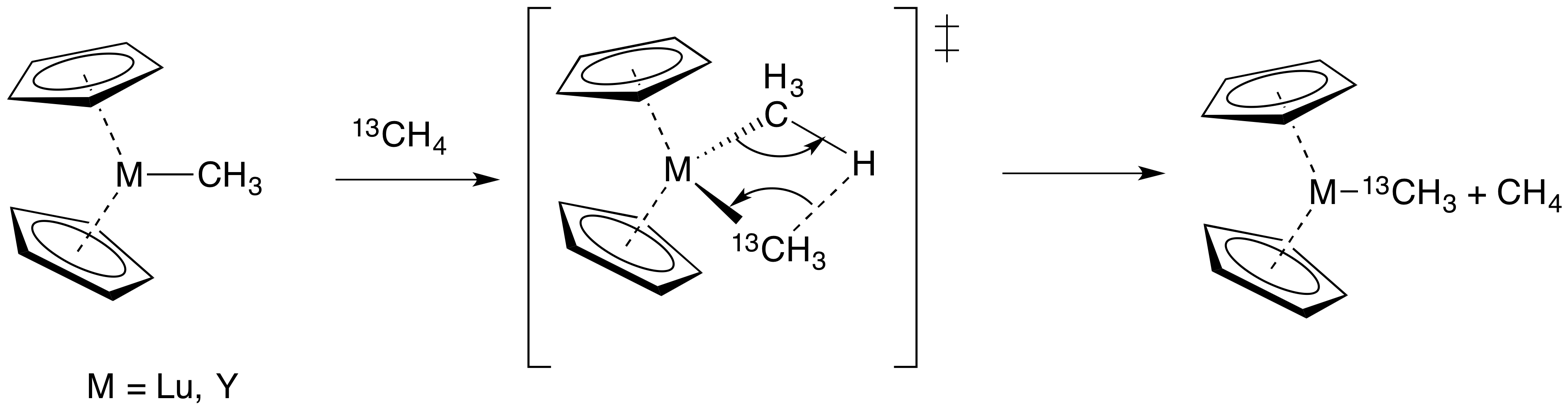
Methane activation via sigma-bond metathesis / (Figure 4)

Sigma bond metathesis involves the formation of new C−H and metal–carbon bonds, where the metals are typically in the d^{0} configuration. Starting with a metal alkyl, a C−H bond coordinates with the metal complex via sigma bonding. A four-member transition state is created, where a new metal–carbon bond is formed, and the former C−H linkage is broken (Figure 4).

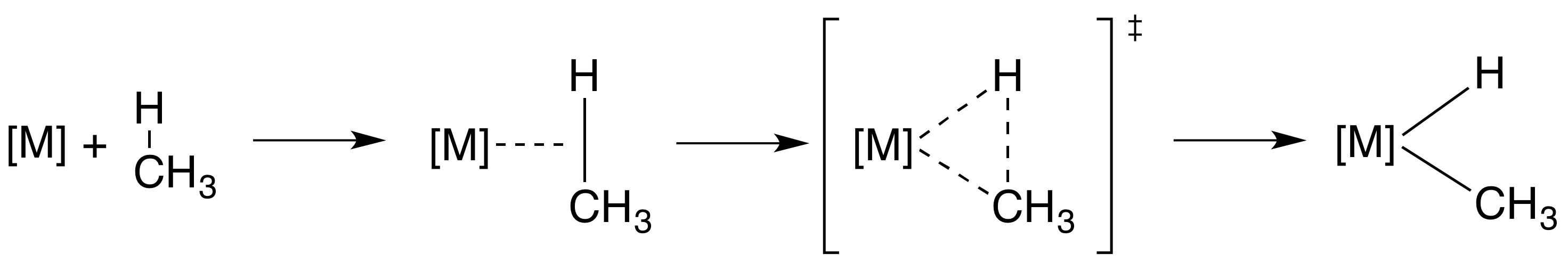
Simple mechanism of using oxidative addition for methane activation / (Figure 5)

In oxidative addition, the metal center's oxidation state increases by 2 units during the process. First, the metal center coordinates with a sigma C−H bond to form an intermediate called a sigma-methane complex. The C−H linkage is then broken, as the metal becomes covalently bonded each to the carbon and the hydrogen (Figure 5).

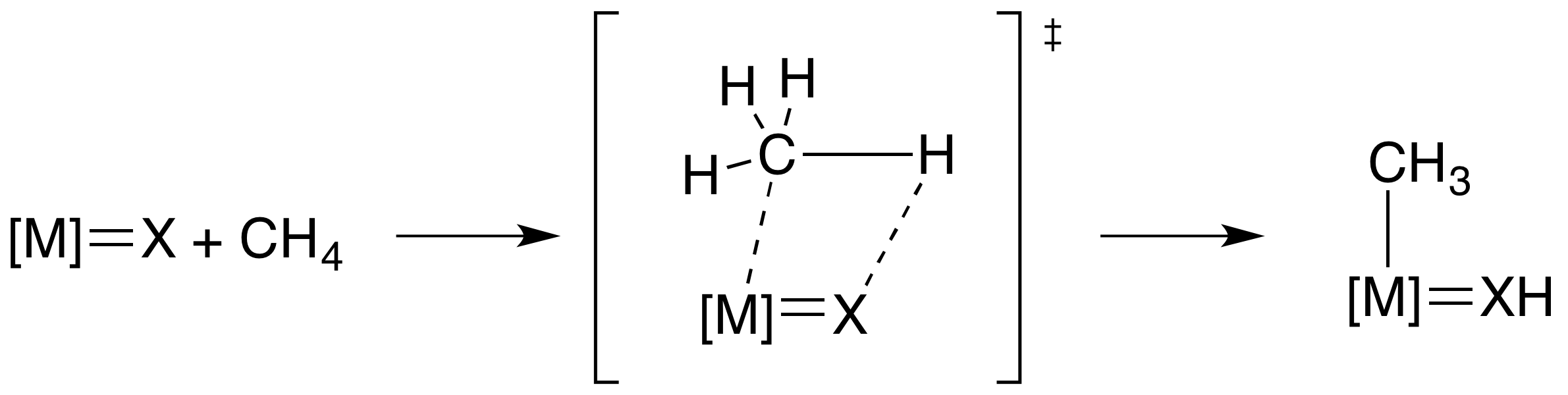
A simplified mechanism of 1,2 addition of methane to unsaturated metal-ligand bonds. / (Figure 6)

Similar to sigma bond metathesis is the 1,2 addition reaction, where a four-membered transition state is also formed. However, a polarized double or triple metal-ligand bond is required in order to favor the formation of the desired product (Figure 6).

== Methane functionalization ==
Once the C−H bond of methane is activated by bonding to a transition metal complex, the net functionalization of the alkyl metal complex into another hydrocarbon containing a functional group is actually much harder to achieve. In general, alkanes of various lengths have typically been functionalized by a number of more commonly known reactions: electrophilic activation (Shilov system, see above), dehydrogenation, borylation, hydrogen-deuterium exchange, and carbene/nitrene/oxo insertion. The functionalization of methane in particular has been reported in four different methods that use homogeneous catalysts rather than heterogeneous catalysts. Heterogeneous systems, using copper- and iron exchanged Zeolite, are also investigated. In these systems, reactive oxygen species such as Alpha-Oxygen are generated which can perform a hydrogen atom abstraction. Finally, photochemically excited elemental mercury has also been shown to activate hydrocarbons, including methane.

=== The Catalytica system ===
In 1993, Periana et al. reported a synthesis of methyl bisulfate from methane using a mercury catalyst at 180 °C. Mercuric bisulfate activates methane electrophilically to form a methyl-complex, which then reacts with sulfuric acid to produce methyl bisulfate. The resulting mercury complex Hg_{2}(OSO_{3})_{2} is re-oxidized by sulfuric acid to regenerate the catalyst and restart the catalytic cycle (Figure 7).

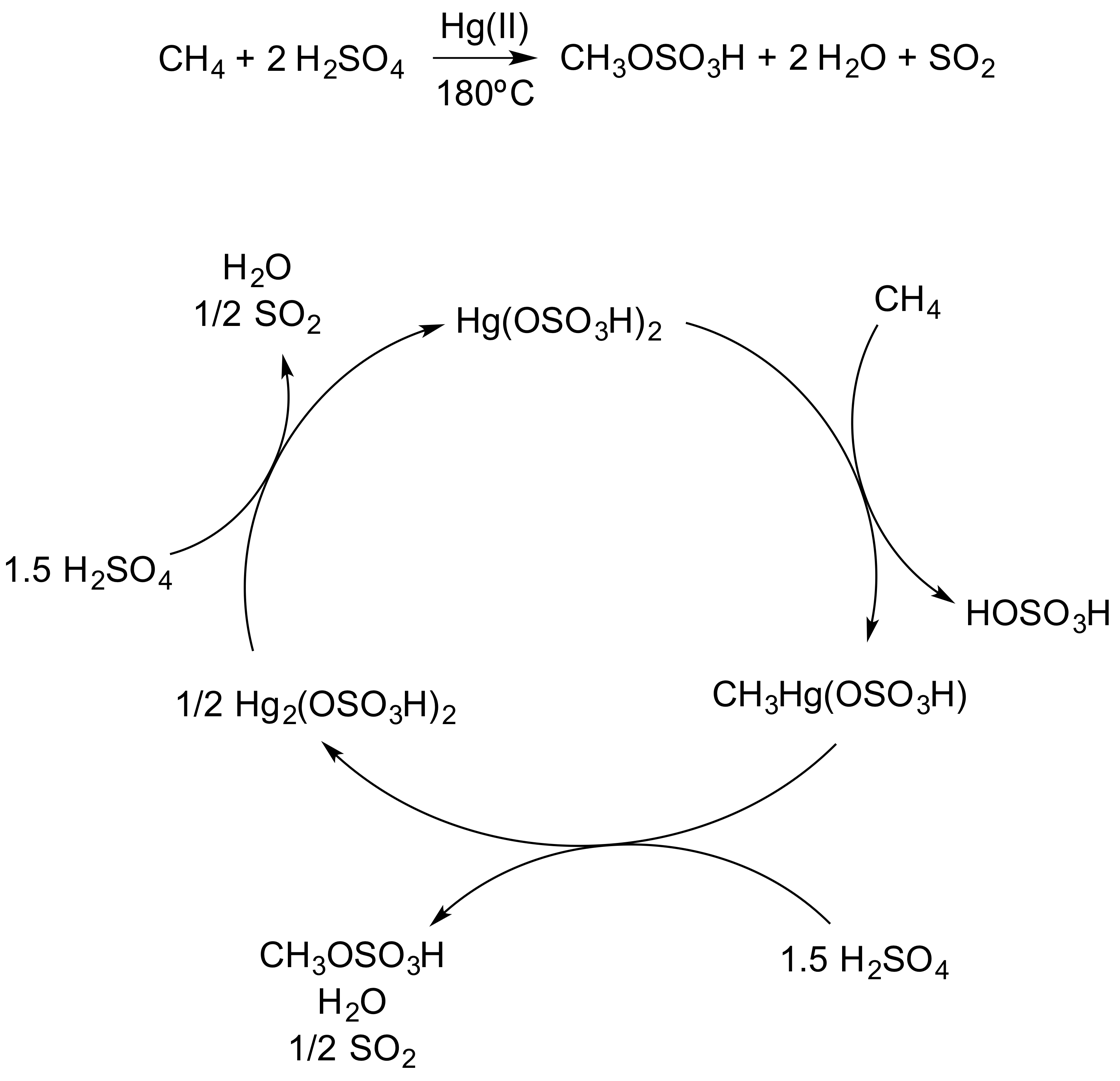
Electrophilic functionalization of methane with Hg(II). / (Figure 7)

This method of functionalizing methane preceded the 1998 discovery by the same group of the so-called Catalytica system, the most active cycle to date in terms of turnover rate, yields, and selectivity. Performing the reaction in sulfuric acid at 220 °C means that the catalyst must be able to withstand these harsh conditions. A platinum-bipyrimidine complex serves as the catalyst. The mechanism for this system is similar to the one described above, where methane is first activated electrophilically to form a methyl-platinum intermediate. The Pt(II) complex is then oxidized to Pt(IV) as two sulfuric acid groups are added to the complex. The reductive elimination of methyl bisulfate transforms the Pt(IV) species back to Pt(II) to regenerate the catalyst (Figure 8).

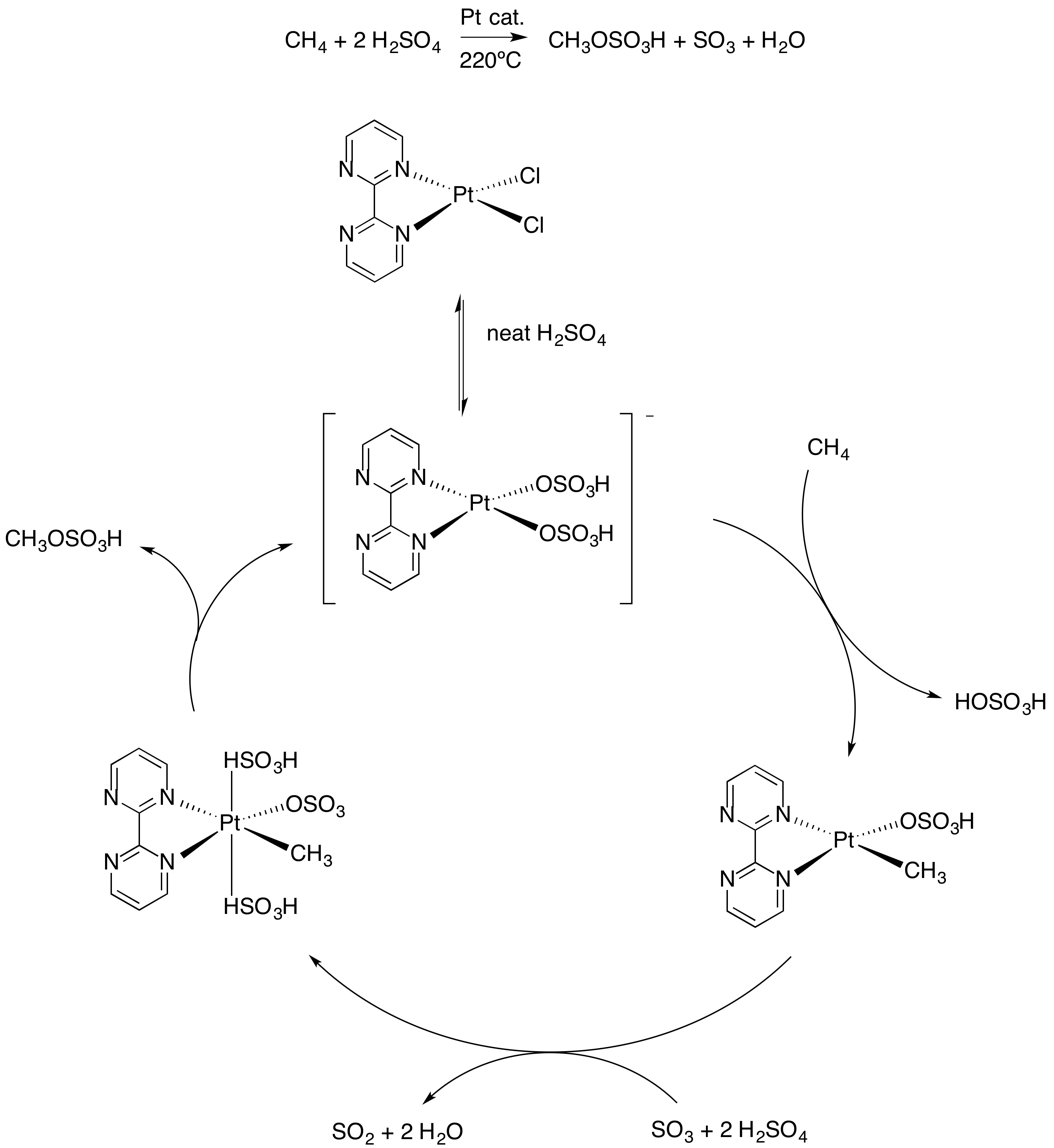
The Catalytica system with a platinum catalyst. / (Figure 8)

In a hypothetical combined process, the Catalytica system could be used in a net conversion of methane to methanol. The methyl bisulfate produced in the cycle could be converted to methanol by hydrolysis, and the sulfur dioxide generated could be converted back to sulfuric acid.

=== Conversion to acetic acid ===
Periana's group was also able to convert methane into acetic acid using similar conditions to the Catalytica system. Palladium(II) salts were used in this process, and the products formed were a mixture of methanol and acetic acid, along with side products of carbon monoxide and possibly carbon dioxide due to over-oxidation. The mechanism of reaction involves another electrophilic activation of methane, and when carbon monoxide is incorporated, the acetic acid derivative is generated through its activation to an acyl intermediate (Figure 9).

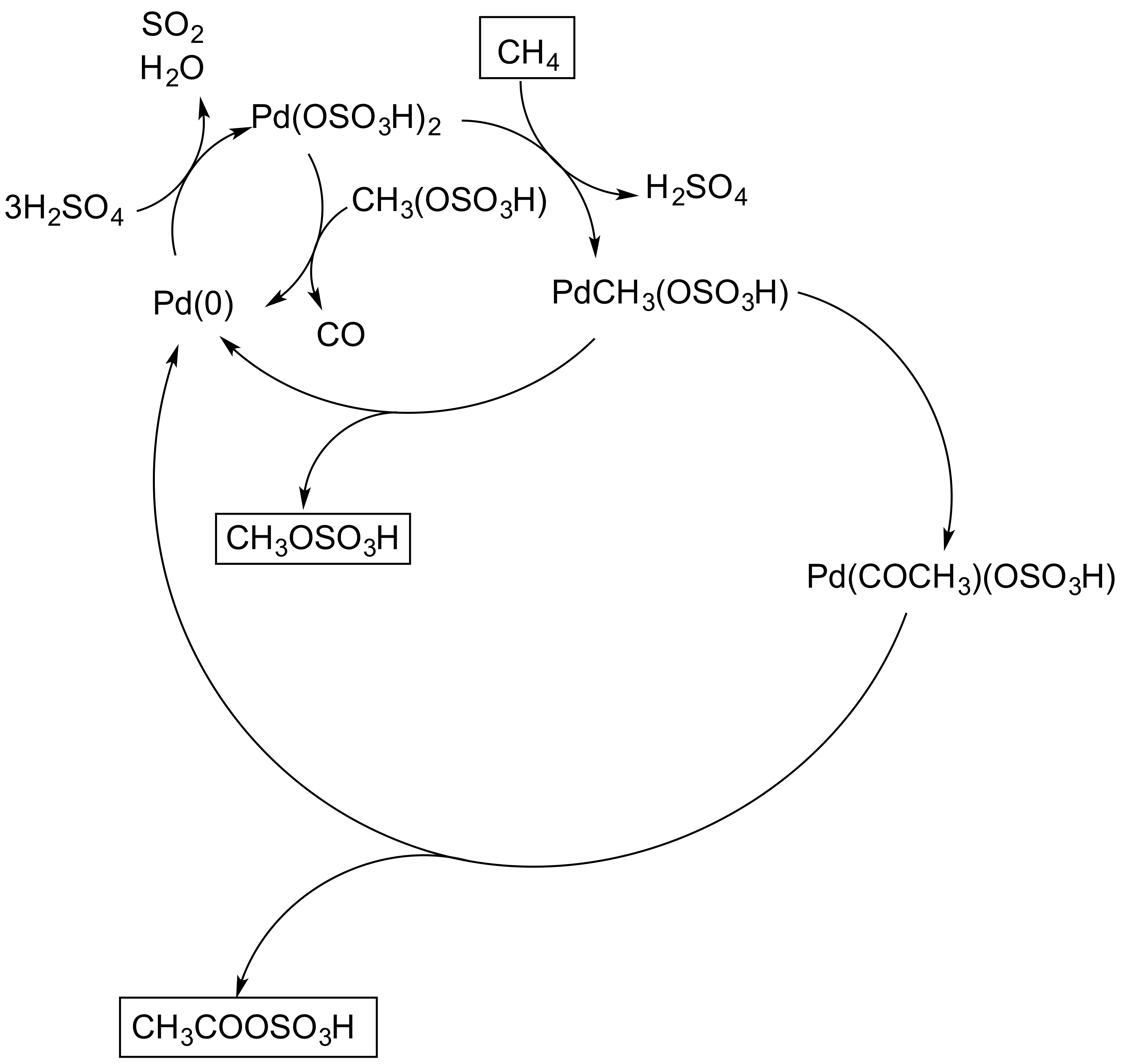
Synthesis of acetic acid from methane using palladium salts. / (Figure 9)

Another example of acetic acid synthesis was demonstrated by Pombeiro et al., which used vanadium-based complexes in trifluoroacetic acid with peroxodisulfate as the oxidant. The proposed mechanism involves a radical mechanism, where methane is the methyl source and trifluoroacetic acid is the carbonyl source. Minor side products were formed, including methyltrifluoroacetate and methylsulfate.

=== Dehydrogenative silation and olefin hydromethylation ===
T. Don Tilley and coworkers were able to use the process of sigma-bond metathesis to design catalytic systems that work by the formation of carbon–carbon bonds. They first demonstrated an example using a scandium-based system, where methane is dehydrogenated and silated. Starting from phenyl silane, methane pressure converts it into Ph_{2}MePhH using a Cp*ScMe catalyst. The scandium complex then transfers the methyl group to the silane by sigma-bond metathesis to form the product and the Cp*_{2}ScH intermediate. The favorable formation of hydrogen gas combined with methane will regenerate the methyl complex from the hydride derivative (Figure 10).

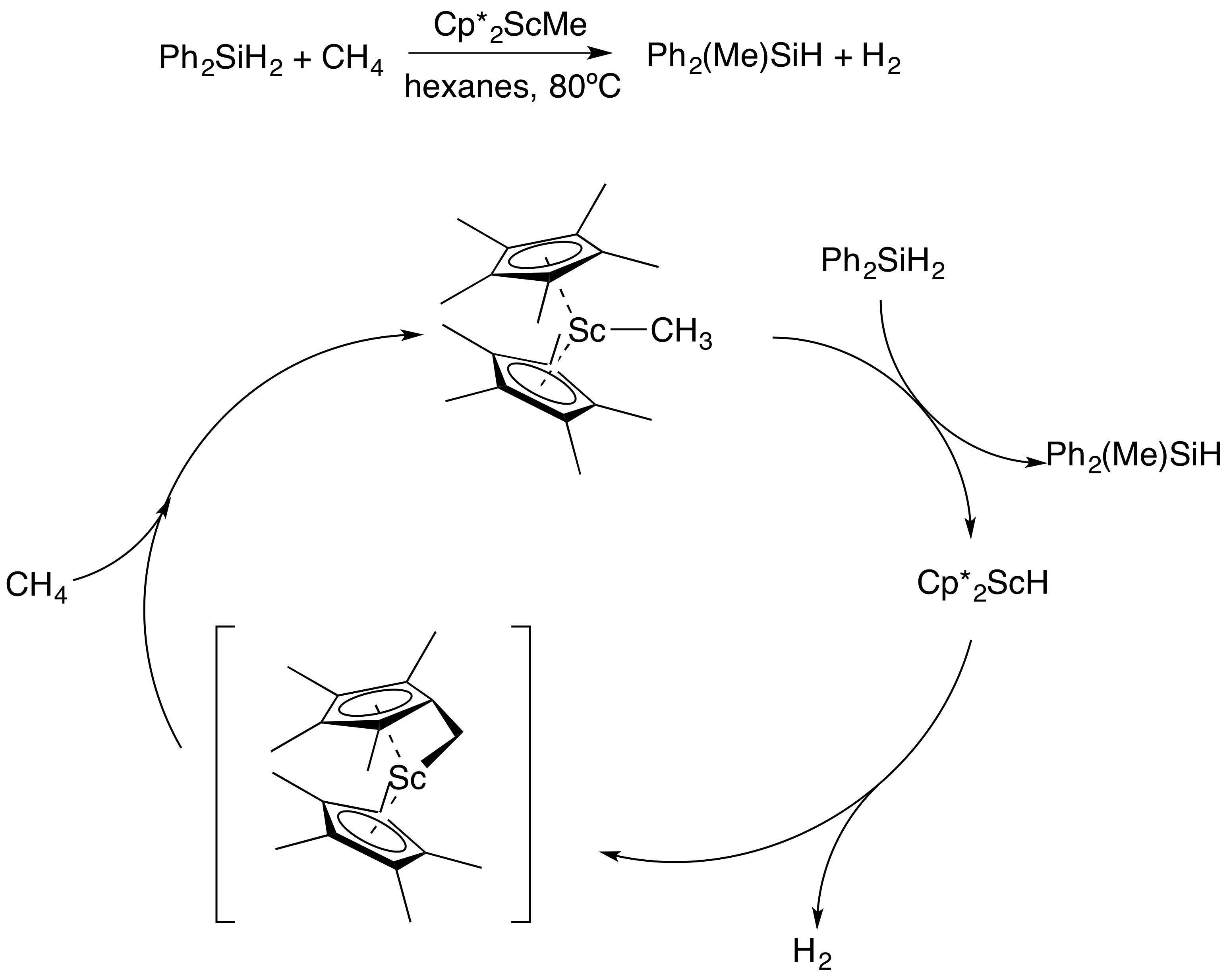
Silation of methane using a scandium catalyst. / (Figure 10)

Cp*_{2}ScMe was also used as a catalyst in the formation of isobutane by adding methane to the double bond of propene. This was achieved when propene and methane were combined in the presence of the scandium catalyst and heated to 80 °C.

=== Carbene insertion ===
Carbene insertion use a different strategy for the functionalization of methane. A strategy using metallocarbenes has been shown with several linear and branched alkanes with rhodium, silver, copper, and gold-based catalysts. With a carbene ligand attached to a metal center, it can be transferred from the coordination sphere and inserted into an activated C−H bond. In this case, there is no interaction between the metal center and the alkane in question, which separates this method from the other methods mentioned above. The general mechanism for this cycle begins with the reaction of an electron-poor metal center with a diazo compound to form a metallo-carbene intermediate. In order for this reaction to occur, the diazo compound must be very electrophilic, since the C−H bond is such a poor nucleophile as well as being an unactivated alkane. The reaction then proceeds in a concerted manner, where the C−H bond of the incoming molecule coordinates with the carbene carbon of the metallocarbene complex. The hydrocarbon then dissociates from the metal center to regenerate the catalyst and free the newly formed carbon–carbon bond (Figure 11).

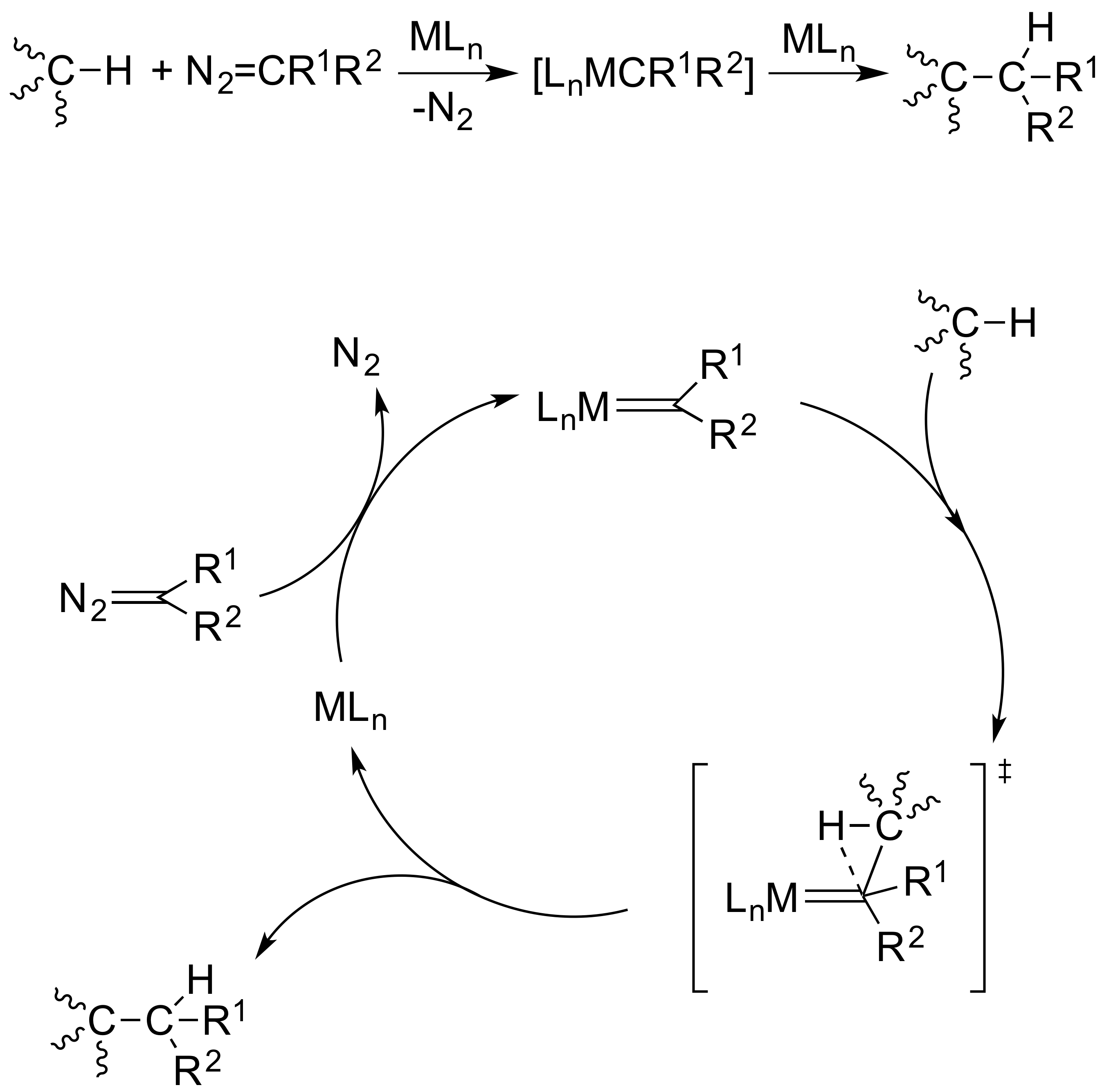
Metal-catalyzed carbene insertion to functionalize alkanes from diazo compounds / (Figure 11)

This route is very successful for higher order alkanes due to the fact that there is no formation of strong metal-carbon or metal–hydrogen bonds that could prevent any intermediates from reacting further. The reactions also take place in room temperature under mild conditions. However, when applying this method to methane specifically, the gaseous nature of methane requires an appropriate solvent. Reactions with other alkanes usually have the alkane in question be the solvent itself; however, any C−H bond with a lower BDE or higher polarity than methane will react first and prevent methane functionalization. Therefore, Pérez, Asensio, Etienne, et al. developed a solution to use supercritical carbon dioxide as the solvent, which is formed under the critical pressure of 73 bar and a temperature of 31 °C. In these conditions, scCO_{2} behaves as a liquid, and since fluorinated compounds can dissolve easily in scCO_{2}, highly fluorinated silver-based catalysts were developed and tested with methane and ethyl diazoacetate. However, under the reaction conditions, only 19% yield of ethyl propionate was able to be achieved. The reaction depends on a delicate balance between methane pressure and catalyst concentration, and consequently more work is being done to further improve yields.
