= Carbon-carbon bond activation =

Process of breaking bonds between carbon atoms

Carbon-carbon bond activation refers to the breaking of carbon-carbon bonds in organic molecules. This process is an important tool in organic synthesis, as it allows for the formation of new carbon-carbon bonds and the construction of complex organic molecules. However, C–C bond activation is challenging mainly for the following reasons: (1) C-H bond activation is a competitive process of C-C activation, which is both energetically and kinetically more favorable; (2) the accessibility of the transition metal center to C–C bonds is generally difficult due to its 'hidden' nature; (3) relatively high stability of the C–C bond (90 kcal/mol^{−1}). As a result, in the early stage, most examples of C-C activation are of stringed ring systems, which makes C-C activation more favorable by increasing the energy of the starting material. However, C-C activation of unstrained C-C bonds has remained challenging until the recent two decades.

== Examples of C-C bond activation ==
Due to the difficulty of C-C activation, a driving force is required to facilitate the reaction. One common strategy is to form stable metal complexes. One example is reported by Milstein and coworkers, in which the C(sp^{2})–C(sp^{3}) bond of bisphosphine ligands was selectively cleaved by a number of metals to afford stable pincer complexes under mild conditions.

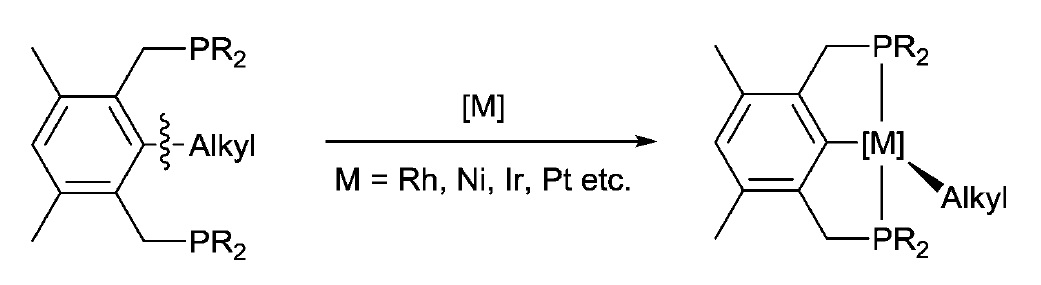
C-C bond activation driven by the formation of stable metal complexes

Aromatization is another driving force that is utilized for C–C bond activation. For example, Chaudret group reported that the C–C bond of steroid compounds can be cleaved through the Ru-promoted aromatization of the B ring. At the same time, a methane molecule is released, which is possibly another driving force for this reaction.

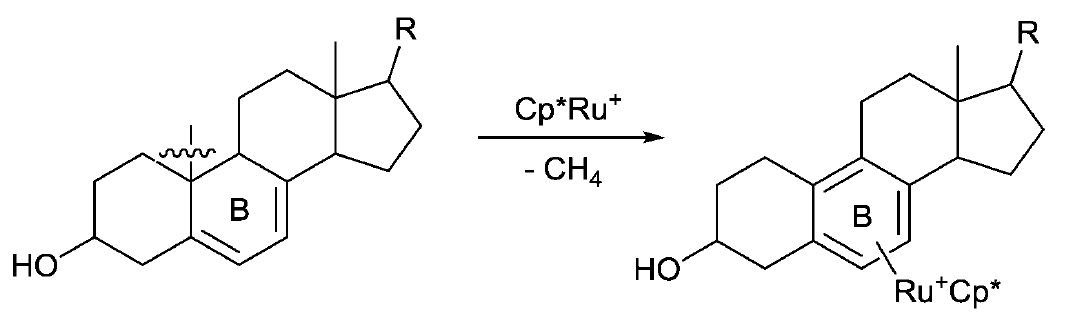
C-C activation driven by aromatization

In addition, the metalloradical has also been proven to have the ability to cleave the C–C single bond. Chan group reported the C–C bond scission of cyclooctane via 1,2-addition with Rh(III) porphyrin hydride, which involved [Rh^{II}(ttp)]· radical as the key intermediate.

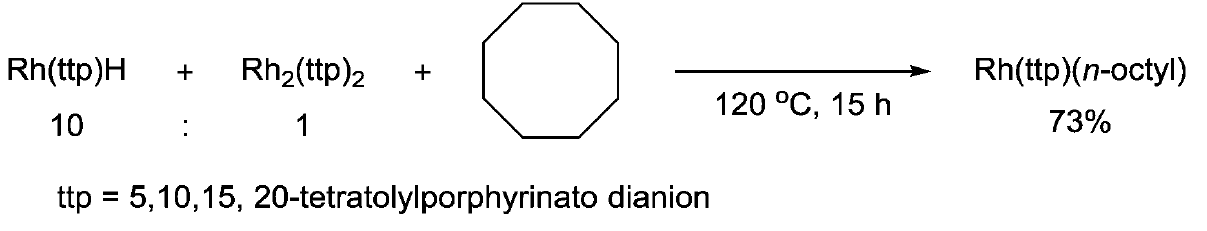
C-C bond activation catalyzed by transition metal radicals

== Mechanism of C-C bond activation ==
Generally speaking, there are two distinct mechanistic pathways that lead to C-C bond activation: (a) the β-carbon elimination of metal complexes. In this mechanism, a M–C intermediate and a double bond are formed at the same time; and (b) the direct oxidative addition of C–C bonds into low-valent metal adducts to form a bis(organyl)metal complex.

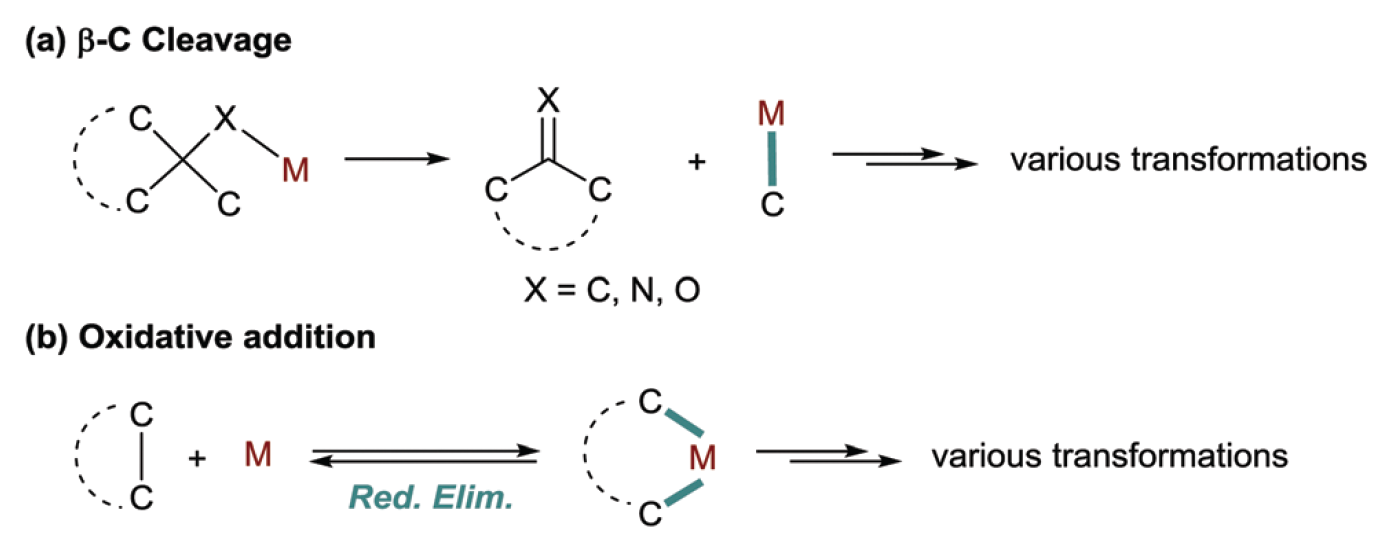
Two distinct pathways for C-C activation

=== β-carbon elimination ===
In 1997, Tamaru group reported the first metal-catalyzed β-carbon elimination of an unstrained compound. Their work revealed a novel Pd(0)-catalyzed ring opening of 4-vinyl cyclic carbonates. They proposed that the reaction is initiated by the elimination of carbon dioxide to form π-allylpalladium intermediate, which is followed by β-decarbopalladation to form dienals and dienones. Since then, this field has bloomed, and a lot of similar reactions were developed and showed their great potential in organic synthesis. The early stage of research in this field has focused on the reaction of M–O–C–C species and β-carbon elimination of the M–N–C–C intermediate was not discovered until the recent ten years. In 2010, Nakamura reported a Cu-catalyzed substitution reaction of propargylic amines with alkynes or other amines as the first example of the transition-metal-catalyzed β-carbon elimination of amines.

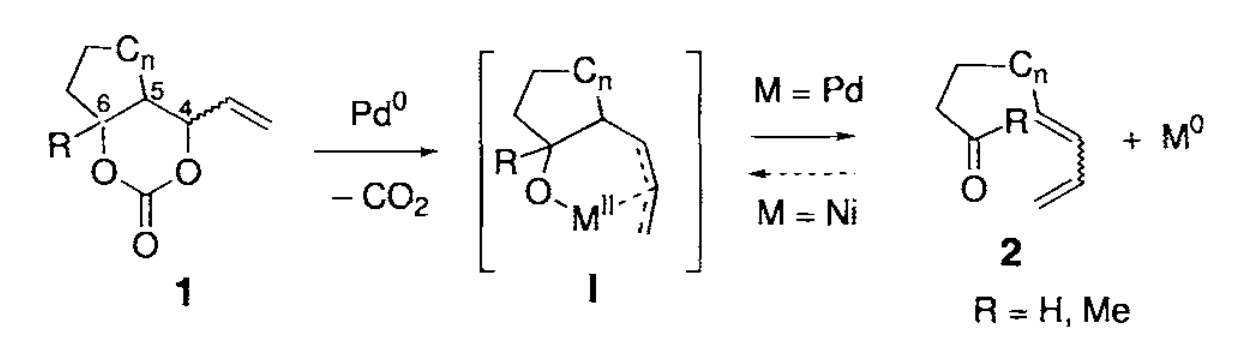
First example of metal-catalyzed β-carbon elimination of unstrained compounds

=== Oxidative addition ===
Compared with β-carbon elimination, oxidative addition of C-C bond is a more direct way of C-C bond activation. However, it is more challenging to do for the following reasons: 1) It forms two weak M-C bonds at the expense of breaking a stable C-C bond, so it is energetically unfavorable; 2) the C-C bond is usually hindered, which makes the metal center hard to approach. As a result, the cleavage of unstrained compounds that have been achieved is mainly focused on ketone substrates. This is because the C–C bond adjacent to the carbonyl of ketones is weaker and can be much more easily cleaved. It also benefits from the less steric hindrance from the planar structure of the carbonyl motif. Suggs and Jun are pioneers in this field. They found that an Rh(I) complex, [RhCl(C_{2}H_{4})_{2}]_{2}, can be oxidatively inserted into the C–C bond of 8-acylquinolines at the 8-position to form relatively stable 5-membered rhodacycles. Subsequently, 8-acylquinoline can be coupled with ethylene to afford 8-quinolinyl ethylketone, which represented the first transition-metal-catalyzed scission of C–C bonds via oxidative addition.

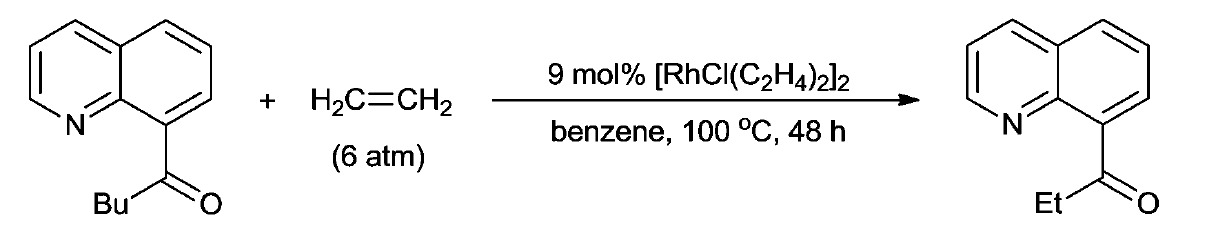
First example of transition-metal-catalyzed scission of C–C via oxidative addition

== Applications of C-C bond activation ==
Carbon-carbon bond activation reactions have numerous applications in organic synthesis, materials science, and pharmaceuticals. In organic synthesis, these reactions are used to construct complex molecules in a highly efficient and selective manner. For example, in 2021, the Dong Group at the University of Chicago described the first enantioselective total synthesis of the natural product penicibilaenes using a late-stage carbon-carbon bond activation strategy. There are also a lot of other examples highlighting the potential of carbon-carbon bond activation strategies in the total synthesis of complex natural products with high stereocontrol.
