= Scripps Energy & Materials Center =

US research center

Coordinates: 26°53′6.5″N 80°6′51.5″W

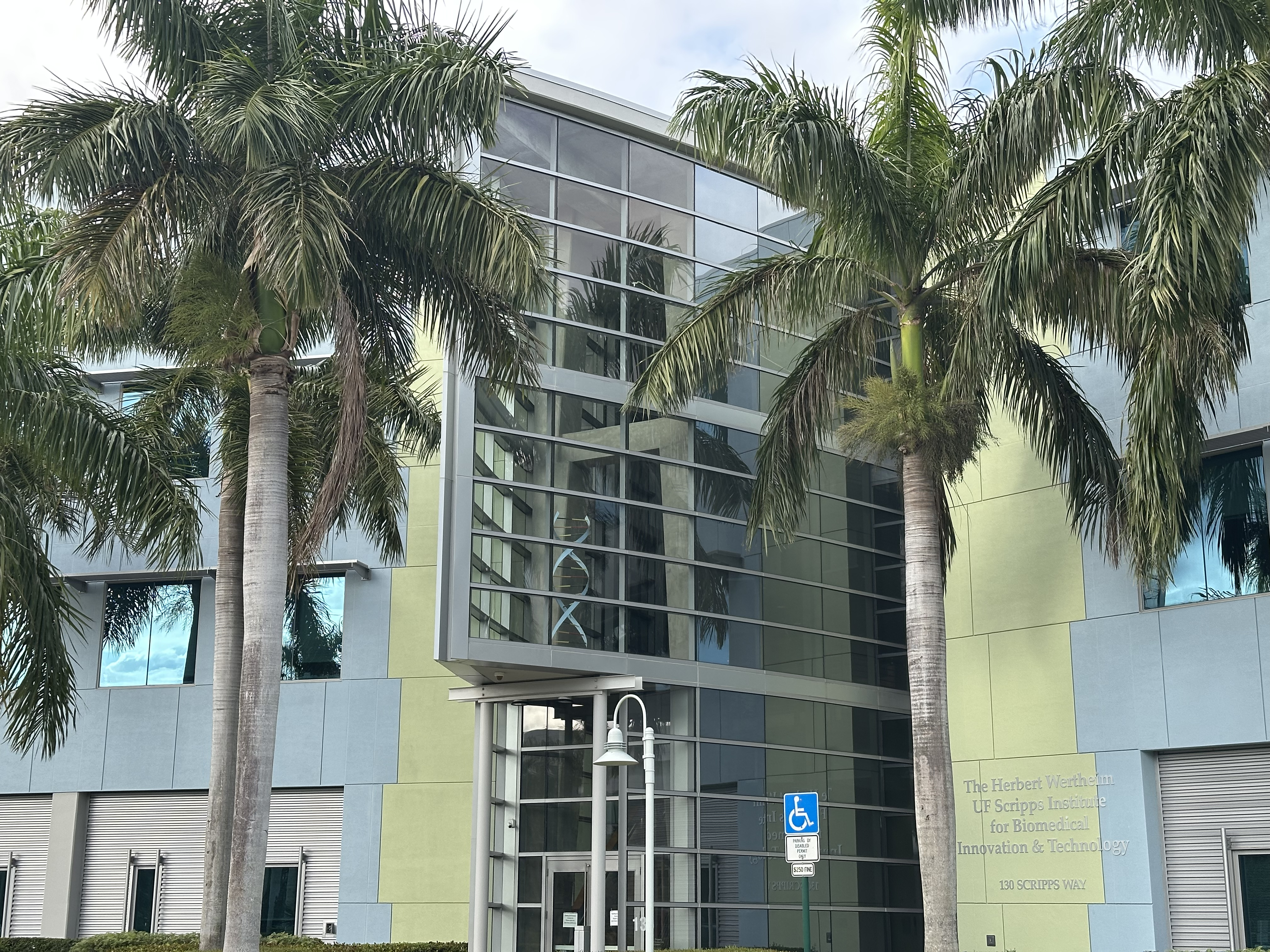
- Established: 2007
- Address: 130 Scripps Way; Jupiter, Florida 33458 USA
- Location: TSRI Jupiter, Florida Campus
- Website: www.scripps.edu/periana/semc

The Scripps Energy & Materials Center (SEMC) is an American research center that focuses on research in the basic energy and materials sciences. Located in Jupiter, Florida, the center has scientists, graduate students, and administrative staff. The SEMC is a part of the Scripps Research Institute (TSRI), one of the largest non-profit research institutes in the world.

== History ==
TSRI was founded as the Scripps Metabolic Clinic in 1924 by the philanthropist Ellen Browning Scripps in La Jolla, California. The Scripps Metabolic Clinic eventually evolved into the Scripps Clinic and Research Foundation. In 1991, the Scripps Clinic and the Research Foundation became separate corporations, and the Scripps Research Institute was founded. In 1989, TSRI established a graduate program. A second campus was opened in Jupiter, Florida in 2005. In 2007, TSRI president Richard Lerner hired internationally renowned chemist Roy A. Periana to lead what would become the Scripps Energy & Materials Center. The goal was to expand from biomedical research to examining large-scale human problems, including disease, access of future raw materials from natural resources, and the manipulation and storage of energy from renewable resources.

== Facilities ==
The Scripps Energy & Materials Center is located on the Scripps Research Institute campus in Jupiter, Florida. The campus occupies 30 acres (120,000 m^{2}) next to the adjacent John D. MacArthur campus of Florida Atlantic University and Max Planck Florida Institute in Palm Beach County, Florida. SEMC scientists operate in the 350,000-square-foot (33,000 m^{2}) research facilities located among approximately 450 faculty, staff, and students that study and work at the campus.

== Leadership ==
The current director of SEMC is Prof. Roy A. Periana, Ph.D. Periana is an internationally recognized chemist in the fields of homogeneous catalysis and CH activation. His previous work has involved the development of several catalytic systems that convert methane to methanol in high yields at modest temperatures. He has also developed chemistry that oxidatively couples methane to acetic acid in a one pot reaction using a palladium catalyst, earning multiple awards.

== Research ==
SEMC is working on fundamentally new chemistry that will enable development of next-generation technologies that more efficiently convert raw materials into materials and energy. Hydrocarbons (e.g. natural gas), nitrogen, oxygen, and water are utilized as the core components for the majority of the world's energy and materials. The current technology for conversion of these molecules is inefficient and expensive, and operates at high temperatures. Furthermore, excessive amounts of carbon dioxide are generated in the consumption of these raw materials. Therefore, new ways to reduce excessive emissions and conserve precious natural resources will be required to sustain the growing pressures on the Earth to supplement humanity's consumption-based lifestyle.

The approach at SEMC is based on the de novo, rational design of new technologies from the ground up through a process involving conceptual design, computational study, and experimental discovery. One of the major emphases within SEMC is the development of new single-site catalysts for the activation and eventual rupture of strong bonds. The goal of new catalysts is to reduce the temperature and pressures required to operate the molecular conversion. Next generation catalysts will be key to lower-temperature processes. Catalysts increase the rate of chemical reactions at lower temperatures and are utilized in very small amounts. There are currently no catalysts that can efficiently convert natural gas, carbon dioxide, nitrogen, oxygen, or water at lower temperatures to useful materials or extract the energy stored in the bonds of these molecules. SEMC is addressing these challenges by designing new catalysts to convert these molecules into products that society uses daily.

The Roy A. Periana group recently published an article in the multidisciplinary journal Science that describes the use of main group, lead and thallium trifluoroacetate salts that convert a natural gas stream (comprising methane, ethane, and propane) to the respective trifluoroacetate esters, which include methyltrifluoroaceate, ethyltrifluoroacetate, ditrifluoroacetateethyleneglycol, propyl-2-trifluoroacetate, and 1,2-difluoroaceatatepropylglycol. It was found that the system readily led to the rapid oxidation of the natural gas stream at 180 °C and was capable of reacting with a mixed gas stream or each alkane independently. This result could lead to a new class of molecular reagents for the selective conversion of alkanes to liquid products having impacts on the transportation fuels and petrochemical industries.

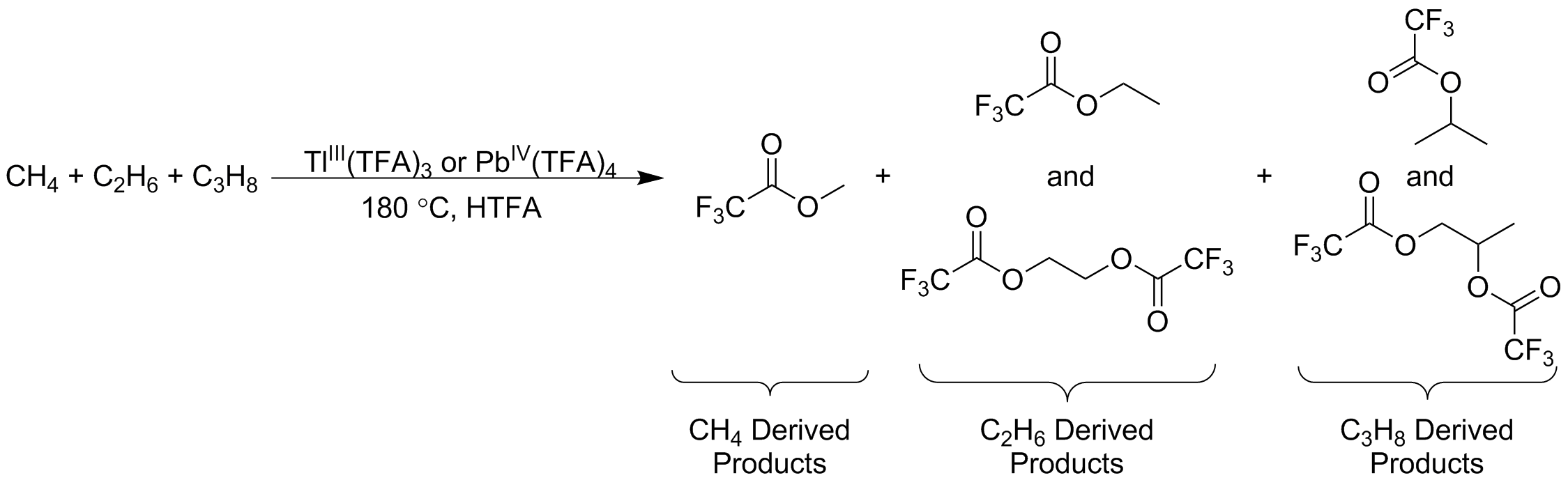
