= Late-stage functionalization =

Late-stage functionalization (LSF) is a desired, chemical or biochemical, chemoselective transformation on a complex molecule to provide at least one analog in sufficient quantity and purity for a given purpose without needing the addition of a functional group that exclusively serves to enable said transformation.

Molecular complexity is an intrinsic property of each molecule and frequently determines the synthetic effort to make it. LSF can significantly diminish this synthetic effort, and thus enables access to molecules, which would otherwise not be available or too difficult to access. The requirements for LSF can be met by both C–H functionalization reactions and functional group manipulations. LSF reactions are particularly relevant and often used in the fields of drug discovery and materials chemistry, although no LSF has been implemented in a commercial process.

== Chemoselectivity ==
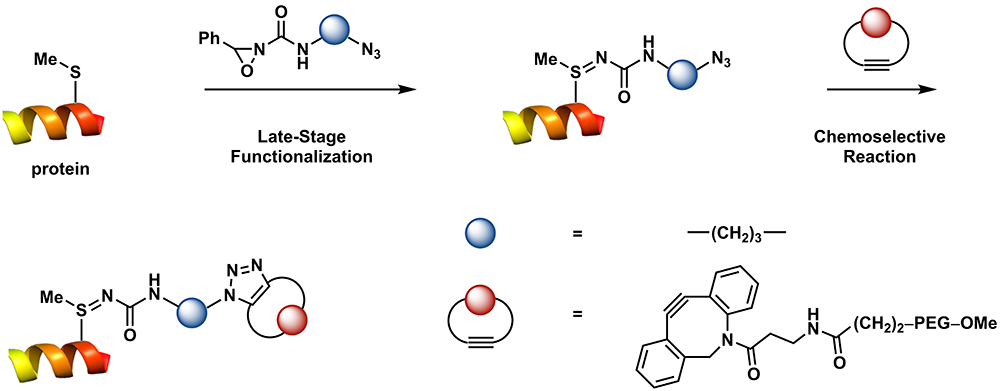
Example for the distinction between LSF and a functional group tolerant reaction.

All LSF reactions are chemoselective but not every chemoselective reaction fulfills the requirements of the definition for LSF. High chemoselectivity is required for a useful LSF with a predictable reaction outcome because complex molecules typically feature several distinct functional groups that need to be tolerated. In this sense, chemoselectivity is sometimes referred to as functional group tolerance. Furthermore, high chemoselectivity avoids often undesired over-functionalization of the valuable substrate, which is used as a limiting reagent in LSF reactions.

Every C–H bond functionalization on a complex molecule classifies as LSF, except when a directing or activating group must be installed in a previous step of the synthesis to accomplish the transformation. For functional group manipulations, the distinction between LSF and functional-group-tolerant reactions is more subtle. For example, peptide bioconjugation reactions make use of the native functionality in amino acid side chains, and thus classify as LSF. In contrast, bioorthogonal 1,3-dipolar cycloadditions (see also copper-free click chemistry and Huisgen cycloaddition) generally require prior introduction of azide or cycloalkyne functionalities to biomolecules. Hence, such transformations do not classify as LSF despite their excellent functional group tolerance.

== Site-selectivity ==
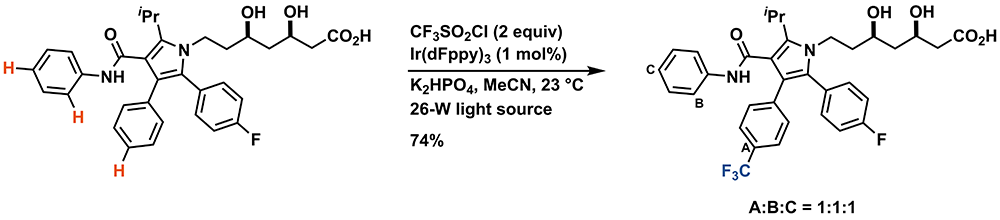
Example for a site-unselective LSF reaction for structural diversification.

Site-selectivity, also positional or regioselectivity, is generally desired but no requirement for LSF reactions because site-unselective LSF reactions can also be useful for special purposes. For example, site-unselective late-stage C–H functionalization reactions can provide quick access to several constitutional isomers of complex molecules relevant for biological testing in drug discovery. Site-selective reactions to access each possible constitutional isomer independently are scarce but highly desirable because cumbersome purification procedures are avoided, and other isomers are not produced as waste. Some LSF reactions provide one constitutional isomer in high selectivity based on innate substrate selectivity for a given reaction or based on catalyst control. The discovery of site-selective LSF reactions constitutes an important research objective in the field of synthetic methodology development.

== Applications ==
LSF has been demonstrated in an alkaloid toxin (veratridine) and used to introduce an azobenzene group to control the toxin activity with light. The two reported LSF routes may allow introducing other functional groups like radioactive or fluorescent labels.

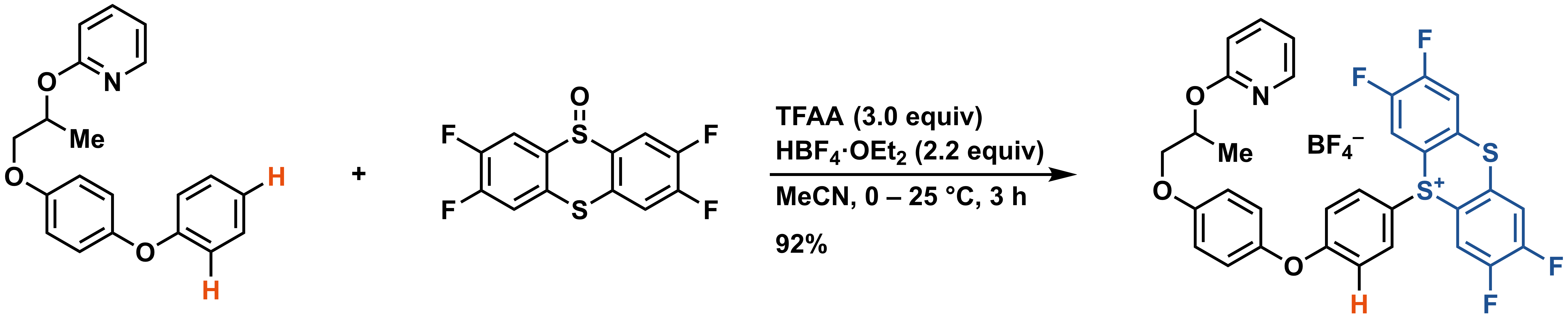
Example for a site-selective LSF reaction, in which the reagent discriminates between two innately reactive aromatic C–H bonds.

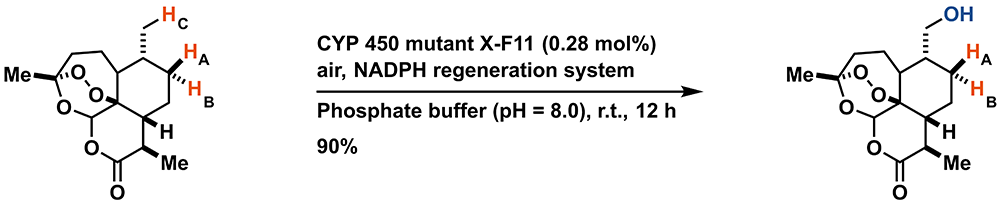
Example for an enzyme catalyzed LSF C–H oxygenation, in which site-selectivity is controlled by the enzyme catalyst.
