= Alexander Shilov (chemist) =

Russian chemist (1930–2014)

Alexander E. Shilov (Russian: Шилов, Александр Евгеньевич) (January 1, 1930 – June 6, 2014) was a Russian chemist, one of the leading figures in Physical Organic Chemistry and Catalysis.

Shilov was born in Ivanovo, Russia, studied chemistry in Kiev and received his diploma degree in 1952 from Kiev State University. In 1952-1955 he began working with Nobel Laureate Nikolay Semyonov toward his Ph.D. at the Academy of Sciences in Moscow. After postdoctoral studies with Sir Cyril Norman Hinshelwood at Oxford University in London, he returned to the Institute of Biochemical Physics (Moscow), where he became Director and Professor at Moscow State University. In 1952 he moved to Institute of Problems of Chemical Physics, Russian Academy of Sciences in Chernogolovka (Moscow district), where he became the Head of Laboratory. In 1990 he was elected to the Academy of Sciences of the USSR, which was in someway equivalent to getting a financial endowment for his research.

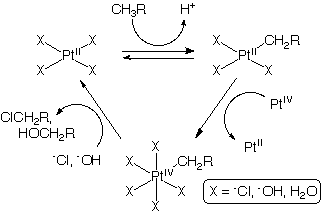
Shilov cycle Catalytic cycle for the oxidation of methane to methanol (where R=H) by a Pt(II) complex in the presence of stoichiometric Pt(IV) species as oxidant.

In the late 1960s and early 1970s, he discovered what are considered to be the first reported examples of alkane reactions catalyzed by a homogeneous (solution-phase) system, the Pt-catalyzed CH activation of alkanes, now known as the Shilov system. Shilov and co-workers conducted extensive mechanistic investigations of this chemistry based on kinetic analysis. In addition to his pioneering work in the activation and functionalization of hydrocarbons, his interests encompassed dinitrogen reduction to ammonia in aqueous media with the use of organometallic complexes.

His work has been published in more than 300 papers which cover research in chemical kinetics and catalysis, mechanisms of chemical reactions, and chemical modeling of enzyme systems.
