= Shilov system =

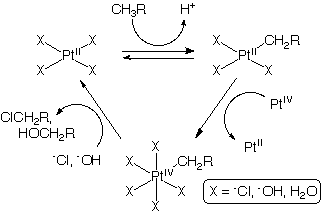
Shilov cycle The overall charge is omitted from the complexes since the exact coordination sphere of the active species is unknown.

The Shilov system is a classic example of catalytic C-H bond activation and oxidation which preferentially activates stronger C-H bonds over weaker C-H bonds for an overall partial oxidation.

== Overview ==
The Shilov system was discovered by Alexander E. Shilov in 1969-1972 while investigating H/D exchange between isotopologues of CH_{4} and H_{2}O catalyzed simple transition metal coordination complexes. The Shilov cycle is the partial oxidation of a hydrocarbon to an alcohol or alcohol precursor (RCl) catalyzed by Pt^{II}Cl_{2} in an aqueous solution with [Pt^{IV}Cl_{6}]^{2−} acting as the ultimate oxidant. The cycle consists of three major steps, the electrophilic activation of the C-H bond, oxidation of the complex, and the nucleophilic oxidation of the alkane substrate. An equivalent transformation is performed industrially by steam reforming methane to syngas then reducing the carbon monoxide to methanol. The transformation can also performed biologically by methane monooxygenase.

Overall Transformation

RH + H_{2}O + [PtCl_{6}]^{2−} → ROH + 2H^{+} + PtCl_{2} + 4Cl^{−}

== Major steps ==
The initial and rate limiting step involving the electrophilic activation of RH_{2}C-H by a Pt^{II} center to produce a Pt^{II}-CH_{2}R species and a proton. The mechanism of this activation is debated. One possibility is the oxidative addition of a sigma coordinated C-H bond followed by the reductive removal of the proton. Another is a sigma-bond metathesis involving the formation of the M-C bond and a H-Cl or H-O bond. Regardless it is this step that kinetically imparts the chemoselectivity to the overall transformation. Stronger, more electron-rich bonds are activated preferentially over weaker, more electron-poor bonds of species that have already been partially oxidized. This avoids a problem that plagues many partial oxidation processes, namely, the over-oxidation of substrate to thermodynamic sinks such as H_{2}O and CO_{2}.

In the next step the Pt^{II}-CH_{2}R complex is oxidized by [Pt^{IV}Cl_{6}]^{2−} to a Pt^{IV}-CH_{2}R complex. There have been multiple studies to find a replacement oxidant that is less expensive than [Pt^{IV}Cl_{6}]^{2−} or a method to regenerate [Pt^{IV}Cl_{6}]^{2−}. It would be most advantageous to develop an electron train which would use oxygen as the ultimate oxidant. It is important that the oxidant preferentially oxidizes the Pt^{II}-CH_{2}R species over the initial Pt^{II} species since Pt^{IV} complexes will not electrophilically activate a C-H bond of the alkane (although Pt^{IV} complexes electrophilically substitute hydrogens in aromatics - see refs. ^{[1]} and ^{[2]} ). Such premature oxidation shuts down the catalysis.

Finally the Pt^{IV}-CH_{2}R undergoes nucleophilic attack by OH^{−} or Cl^{−} with the departure of Pt^{II} complex to regenerate the catalyst.
