= Carbene C−H insertion =

Reaction in organic chemistry

Carbene C−H insertion in organic chemistry concerns the insertion reaction of a carbene into a carbon–hydrogen bond. This organic reaction is of some importance in the synthesis of new organic compounds. It is an example of C–H functionalization, and depending on authorial conventions may be considered a C−H activation reaction.

Simple carbenes such as the methylene and dichlorocarbene are not regioselective towards insertion, and prochiral substrates give racemic products. Metal-stabilized carbenes are much more selective. The first such reaction was reported in 1981, and the general mechanism proposed by Doyle in 1993. In the transition state, the stabilizing metal partially dissociates, with concurrent Lewis-acid attack on the C−H bond. The resulting three-membered ring then collapses for a net proton transfer and carbon–carbon bond formation, and simultaneous expulsion of the metal:

The reaction thus occurs with retention of configuration.

The copper catalysts used in this reaction historically have been superseded by rhodium. Other metals stabilize the carbene too much (e.g. molybdenum), giving Fischer carbenes; or too little (e.g. silver or gold, although modern ligands have enabled these metals). Dirhodium tetraacetate is a particularly effective achiral catalyst, and Rh_{2}(methyloxycarbonyl phenylpropanoyl imidazolidineoxido)_{4} an effective asymmetric one:

Chiral dirhodium catalysts. Only one ligand displayed for clarity; also one methylene bridge in MPPIM omitted between the phenyl group and the ureamide

Regioselectivities vary quite dramatically with catalyst ligand. With rhodium acetate, carbenes prefer to insert onto arenes (a form of electrophilic aromatic substitution) more than cyclopropanate, which is preferred to insertion at alkyl carbons. More electrophilic ligands (e.g. trifluoroacetate) accentuate these reactivity preferences; less electrophilic ones (e.g. acetamide) reduce or reverse them. Alkyl C−H bonds are preferred based on their ability to stabilize a cation: tertiary over secondary over primary. In a typical reaction ethyl diazoacetate and dirhodium tetraacetate react with hexane: the insertion into a C−H bond occurs 1% on one of the methyl groups, 63% on the α methylene unit and 33% on the β unit. For aryl C−H insertion, reaction typically occurs ortho to any Lewis-basic substituents present (the catalyst effects directed ortho metalation). However, certain gold catalysts can perform para insertion onto an activated ring.

The most successful reactions are intramolecular within geometrically rigid systems.
