= Roy A. Periana =

Guyanese-American organometallic chemist (born 1957)

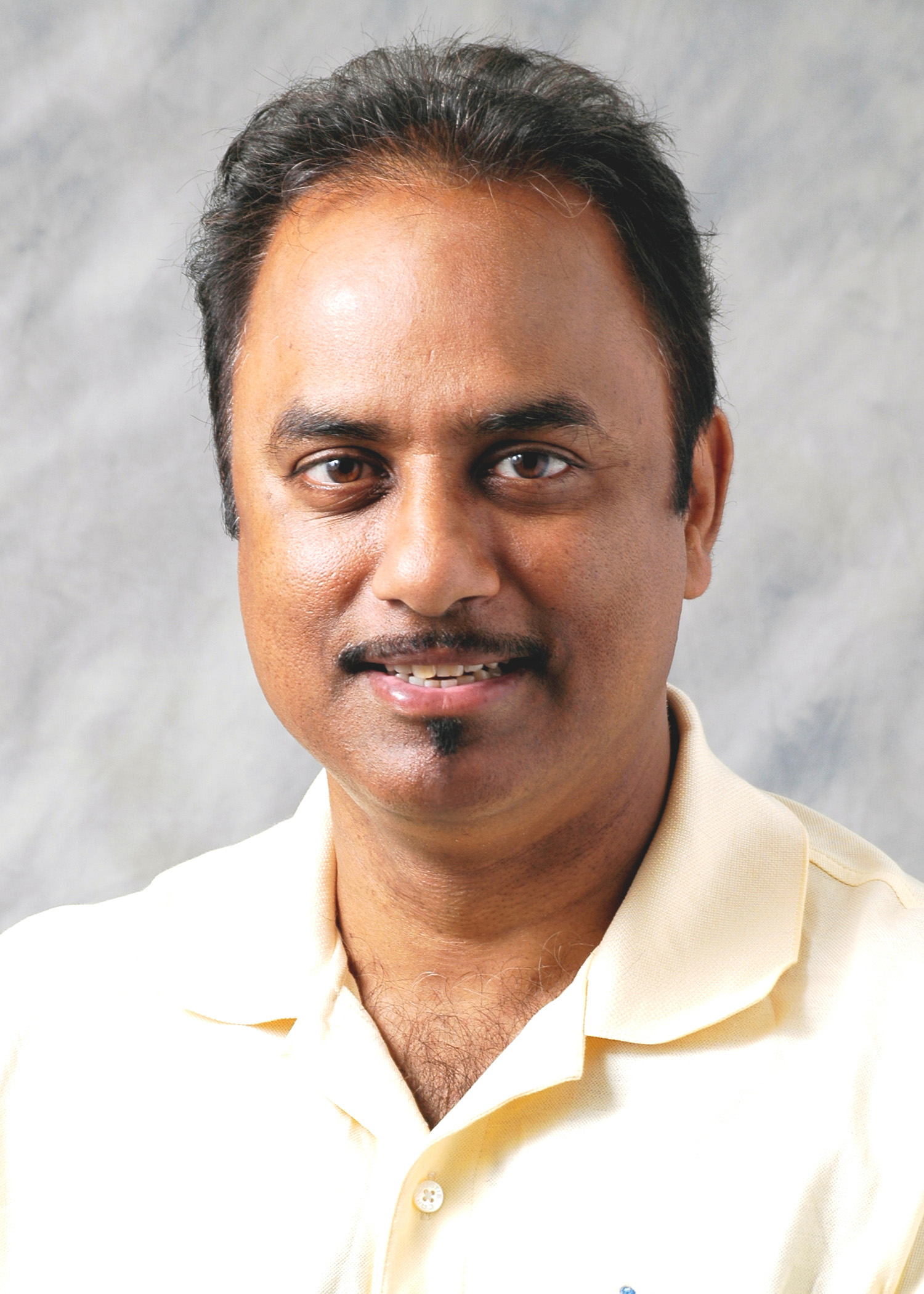
- Born: 1957 (age 68–69); Georgetown, Guyana
- Education: The University of Michigan, B.S. University of California, Berkeley, Ph.D.
- Known for: CH Bond Functionalization
- Scientific career
- Fields: Homogeneous catalysis
- Workplaces: The Scripps Research Institute The University of Southern California; Catalytica Inc. Catalytica Advanced Technologies; Dow Chemical Monsanto Company
- Doctoral advisor: Robert G. Bergman

Roy A. Periana is a Guyanese-American organometallic chemist.

== Biography ==
=== Early life ===
Periana was born in Georgetown, Guyana in 1957. After moving to the United States after high school, he studied and received a B.S. in chemistry at the University of Michigan in 1979. He then worked in industry at the Dow Chemical Company in Midland, Michigan. In 1981, he returned to graduate school at the University of California Berkeley where he received his Ph.D. in 1985 under Robert G. Bergman. His work with Bergman focused on the development of novel rhodium complexes that undergo C-H and C-C bond activation of alkanes. His dissertation was entitled, "Mechanism of Oxidative Addition of Cyclopentadienyl-Rhodium Complexes to Carbon-Hydrogen and Carbon-Carbon Bonds."

=== Career ===
After graduation, Periana joined the Monsanto Company as a research chemist. In 1988, he moved to Silicon Valley and joined Catalytica, Inc. as a Team Leader. Several years later, his group spun off from Catalytica, Inc. to form Catalytica Advanced Technologies with Periana as co-founder and VP of research. In 2000, Periana transitioned into academia. He accepted a position as Professor of Chemistry and member of the Loker Hydrocarbon Institute at the University of Southern California. There he was also the director of USC-Caltech-Chevron Corporation Consortium on New Catalysis Technology. In 2007, Prof. Richard A. Lerner of the Scripps Research Institute offered Prof. Periana a position as Professor of Chemistry and director of a new research center on the Jupiter, Florida, campus of the Scripps Research Institute. In 2007, the Scripps Energy & Materials Center was founded as a center to enable a new generation of chemistry for a sustainable planet.

CH_{4} and other hydrocarbons, (N_{2}, O_{2}, H_{2}O, and CO_{2}) are among the most abundant raw materials on Earth. The conversion of these small molecules generate the majority of the world's energy and materials and the bulk of CO_{2} emissions. The bonds (forces) that hold the atoms together in all of these small molecules are among the strongest known in chemistry. In spite of over 75 years of research, the chemistries to control and break these bonds at lower temperatures have not been developed. As a result, current technologies to convert these raw materials are inefficient and lead to substantially more emissions, faster depletion of reserves, higher costs and greater dependence on petroleum than required. Designing the next generation chemistries that can break these bonds under mild conditions can lead to a new generation of technologies that will be substantially more efficient and cost effective. This will be essential for a more sustainable planet in the 21st century. The focus of Periana's research is the design of new chemistry based on molecular (also referred to as homogeneous or single site) catalysts that can facilitate the cleavage of strong bonds of these raw materials. One main area of focus of much of Periana's career has been on the selective, partial oxidative conversion of methane (CH_{4}, the main component of natural gas) to methanol (MeOH). The general strategy that is being utilized is the design of molecular catalysts that operate by CH activation: a reaction whereby a molecular catalyst, MX, can react with and cleave the RH bond to generate M-R intermediates under mild conditions with high selectivity. Continuous functionalization of these MR intermediates to products with regeneration of MX leads to a very effective catalytic cycle for direct, selective alkane functionalization.

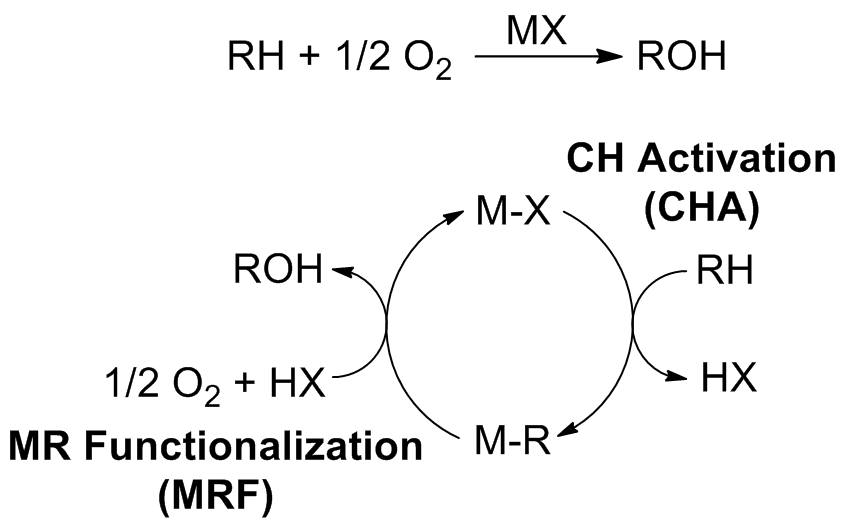
AlkaneOxCy

Periana has demonstrated several working examples of molecular catalysts based on electrophilic CH activation (generates positive charge on the C during CH cleavage) that operate in sulfuric acid (H_{2}SO_{4}) to convert methane to methyl bisulfate, the sulfate ester of methanol in high yield and selectivity. The two most prominent examples of this work involved the use of Hg(II) cations or a Pt(bpym)Cl_{2} complex. In addition to increasing the rate at which the CH bond is cleaved central to the success of this approach has been the use of the acid solvent to both activate the catalyst as well as "protect" the alcohol product through protonation reactions.

Periana published an article in the multidisciplinary journal Science describing the use of main group trifluoroacetate salts of lead and thallium that convert a natural gas stream (comprising methane, ethane, and propane) to the respective trifluoroacetate esters. It was found that the system readily led to the rapid oxidation of the natural gas stream at 180 °C and was capable of reacting with a mixed gas stream or each alkane independently.

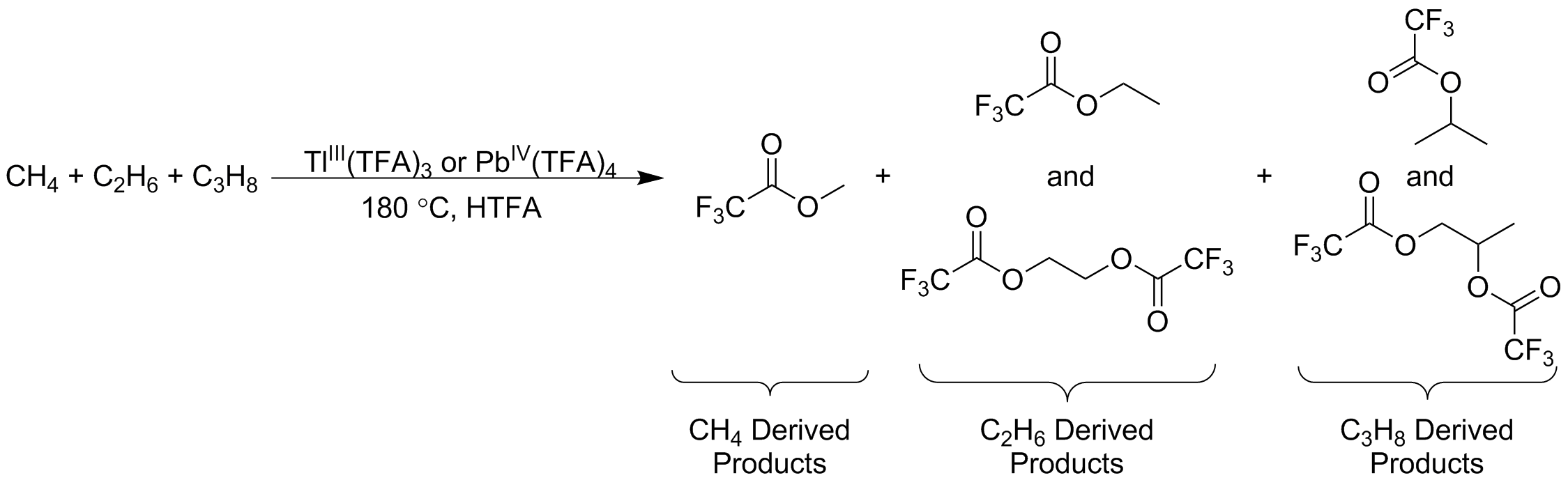

He has since extended his work on CH activation, to examine the use of basic solvents to facilitate the activation of strong bonds. The fundamental strategy in this case is to develop catalysts that operate by nucleophilic CH activation that, in contrast of electrophilic CH activation, generates negative charge on the carbon during CH cleavage. The expectation is that in this case the strongly basic solvent can both activate the catalyst as well as "protect" the alcohol product by deprotonation. This is done by the use of non-innocent ligands that participate in the reaction by protonation or deprotonation. This allowed for the demonstration of the first example of aqueous base accelerated CH activation involving the use of a Ru(IPI)Cl_{3} pre-catalyst where IPI = 2,6-diimidizoylpyridine. This strategy has led to demonstration of CH activation by a Ru(II)(IPI)(OH)_{n}(H_{2}O)_{m} complex dissolved in aqueous KOH. As hoped, it was found that rates of CH activation are accelerated by increasing [KOH].

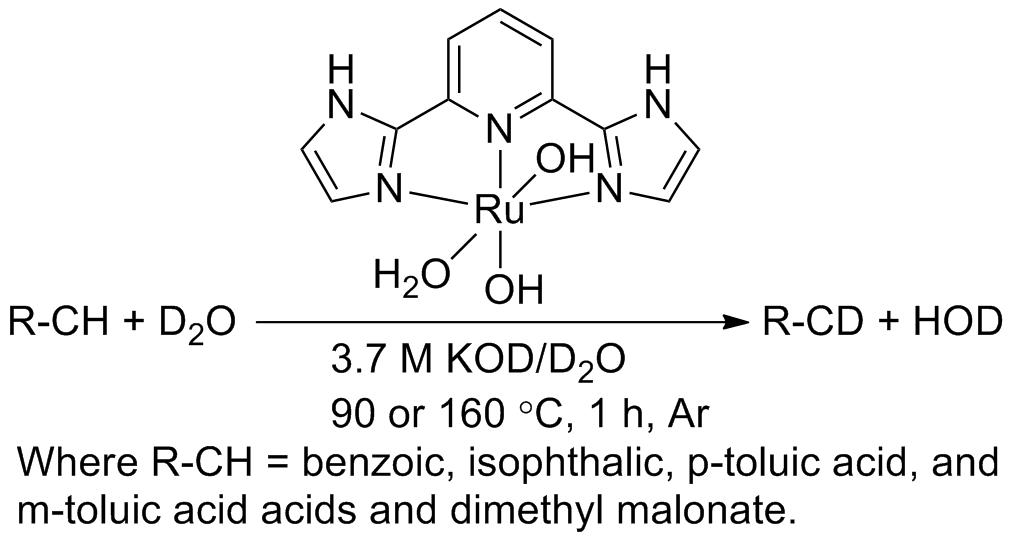

Periana is currently the Director of the Scripps Energy & Materials Center, (SEMC). Periana's vision for SEMC is to bring together all the skills and expertise in the activation of strong bonds in the small molecules CH_{4}, N_{2}, O_{2}, H_{2}O, and CO_{2} under one roof with the goal of developing a new generation of clean, cost-effective technologies for a sustainable planet in the 21st century.

== Awards and professional activities ==
Roy Periana has been involved in a variety of synergistic activities:

- Keynote Speaker at 1998, Zimmerman Organometallic Workshop
- Keynote Speaker at the 1998, Bloomberg Conference on Energy
- Graduate Scholastic Honor Society, U.C. Berkeley, 1983 - 1985
- Achievement Award, Monsanto Company, 1987 and 1988
- Invited Speaker at 1993, 1997 and 1999 Gordon Organometallic and Inorganic Reaction Mechanisms Conferences
- Publications in Science (1993, 1998, 2003 & 2014). Wide coverage in various media: C&E News, Wall Street Journal, New York Times, etc.
- Chairman of National ACS Inorganic Symposium in 1999
- Catalytica Adv. Technologies, Inc. Co-Founder and Vice President 1994-2000
- Seminaire Hors-Ville en Chimie Inorganique Switzerland, September, 2001
- Topics in Current Chemistry. Volume Editor: C-H Activation, 2005
- Japan Society for the Promotion of Science (JSPS) Fellowship, 2007
- Co-Founder and Member of Board of Directors, Qateomix, Inc. Covina, CA
