= Β-Carbon elimination =

Chemical reaction

β-Carbon elimination (beta-carbon elimination) is a type of reaction in organometallic chemistry wherein an allyl ligand bonded to a metal center is broken into the corresponding metal-bonded alkyl (aryl) ligand and an alkene. It is a subgroup of elimination reactions. Though less common and less understood than β-hydride elimination, it is an important step involved in some olefin polymerization processes and transition-metal-catalyzed organic reactions.

== Overview ==
Like β-hydride elimination, β-carbon elimination requires the metal to have an open coordination site cis to the alkyl group for this reaction to occur. β-carbon elimination is usually less favored than hydride elimination because the metal–hydride bond is stronger than the metal–carbon bond for most metals in catalytic reactions. The principles governing β-alkyl elimination are not well-established experimentally. One reason for this is that breaking C−C bonds in the presence of other reactive C−H bonds is a rare event, and systems designed to interrogate the reaction are more difficult to devise.

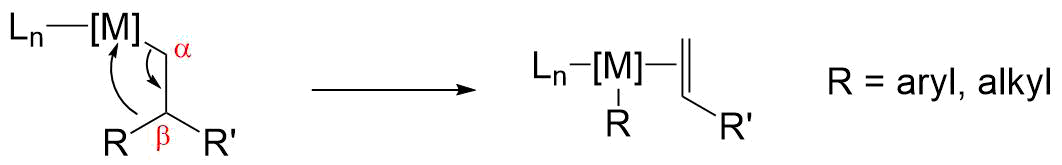

== β-alkyl elimination ==
β-alkyl elimination is the most common and useful type among all β-carbon elimination reactions.

=== Classification/Driving force ===
==== β-alkyl elimination with early transition metal complexes ====
In terms of thermodynamics, more electron-deficient metal centers increase the likelihood of β-alkyl elimination. For example, β-alkyl elimination is more favorable than β-hydride elimination when it is bonded to electron-deficient early transition metals (Hf, Ti, Zr, Nb, etc.) with d^{0} configuration. Computational studies show a thermodynamic preference for β-Me elimination over β-H elimination in these complexes due to additional stability for the metal–alkyl species. The origin of the additional bonding interaction comes from an orbital centered on the CH_{3} weakly π-donating to the LUMO of the d^{0} of the metal center which is analogous to the hyperconjugation effect (see figure on the right), thus increasing the stability of M−CH_{3} over M−H species. Their calculations predict that a more electrophilic metal ion enhances the −CH_{3} π-donation, which consequently increases the stability of M−CH_{3} over M−H species. Conversely, a more electron-rich metal ion will favor M−H formation (for example, using the more electron-donating Cp* ligand in Cp*_{2}MX_{2}).

In terms of kinetics, steric effects of ligands could play a role in increasing the energy barrier of β-H elimination relative to β-alkyl elimination, specifically when the ligand is Cp*. A model was proposed to illustrate this effect: In both β-methyl elimination (A) and β-hydride elimination (B), the transferring group aligns perpendicular to the Cp*(centroid)−Zr−Cp*(centroid), allowing the σ_{C−C} or σ_{C−H} bond to overlap with the metal d-orbital. However, to achieve the prerequisite geometry for β-H elimination (B), the adjacent methyl group experiences a significant steric repulsion from the Cp* ligand, thereby elevating the barrier to hydride transfer. By contrast, transition state A for β-Me elimination experiences less steric interaction with the Cp* ligand.

==== β-alkyl elimination with middle and late transition metal complexes ====
In middle and late transition metal complexes, there is larger thermodynamic preference for β-H elimination over β-alkyl elimination, where the difference is usually >15 kcal/mol. Examples involved middle and late transition metal complexes are either absent of β-hydrogens or use ring strain relief and aromaticity as driving forces to favor β-alkyl elimination over β-hydride elimination.

== Applications ==
=== Ring-opening polymerization (ROP) ===
Ring-opening polymerization that involves β-alkyl elimination can be catalyzed by Ti, Zr, Pd-based catalyst, and some Lanthanide-based metallocene catalyst, where different polymerization patterns vary when catalysts are different. Examples of copolymerization with alkene or carbon monoxide were also reported. The key step of this kind of ROP is string-driven β-alkyl elimination, which provides linear polymer with unsaturation in the polymer chain.

=== Organic synthesis ===
There is enormous amount of catalytic processes involving β-alkyl elimination that are synthetically useful. β-alkyl elimination in this case, however, is often considered as an alternative way of C–C bond cleavage while oxidative addition is the direct way. One of the examples is β-alkyl elimination of tert-alcoholates which can generate from either addition of an organometallic reagent or ligand exchange. The consequent organometallic species can undergo various downstream reactivities (reductive elimination, carbonyl insertion, etc.) to generate useful building blocks.

In addition to ring strain, aromaticity-driven β-Me elimination can be effectively employed to dealkylate steroid derivatives and some other cyclohexyl compounds.

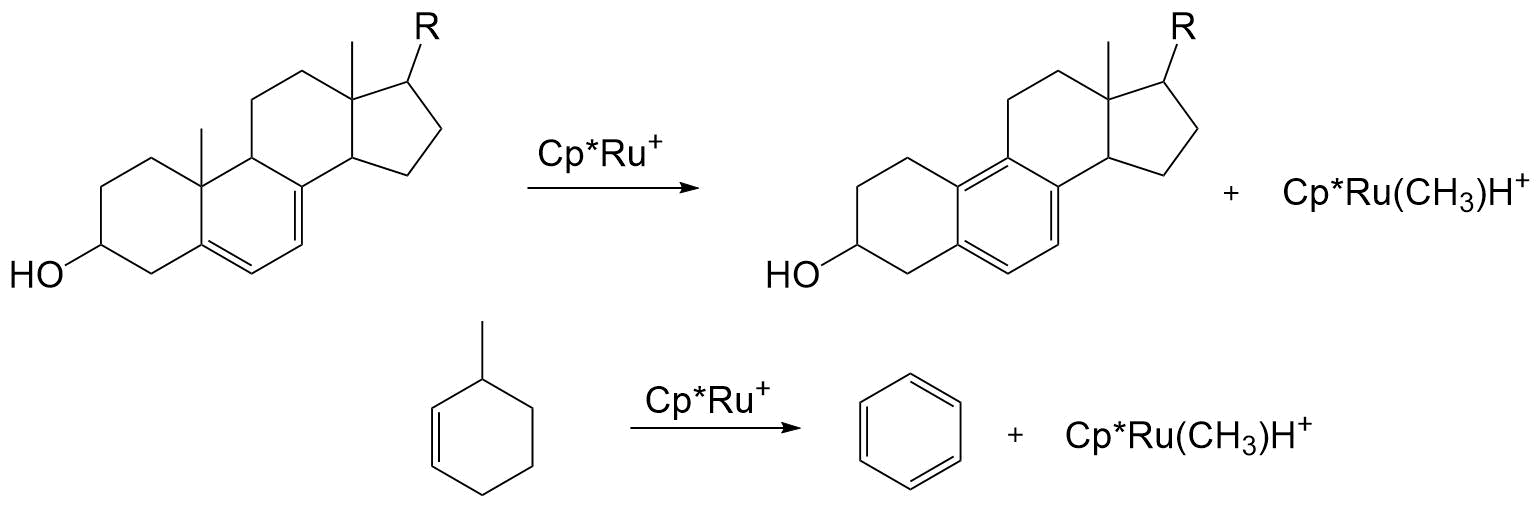

== β-aryl elimination ==
β-aryl elimination is much less common and understood than β-alkyl elimination. Examples are reported to occur from metal alkoxide and amido complexes. A theoretical study showed that these reactions are driven by consequent extensive conjugation system. A very recent example of catalytic β-aryl elimination which leads to enantioselective synthesis of biaryl atropisomers is driven by release of distorted ring string.
