= Sigma-bond metathesis =

In organometallic chemistry, sigma-bond metathesis is a chemical reaction wherein a metal-ligand sigma bond undergoes metathesis (exchange of parts) with the sigma bond in some reagent. The reaction is illustrated by the exchange of lutetium(III) methyl complex with a hydrocarbon (R-H):

(C_{5}Me_{5})_{2}Lu-CH_{3} + R-H → (C_{5}Me_{5})_{2}Lu-R + CH_{4}

This reactivity was first observed by Patricia Watson, a researcher at duPont.

The reaction is mainly observed for complexes of metals with d^{0} configuration, e.g. complexes of Sc(III), Zr(IV), Nb(V), Ta(V), etc. f-Element complexes also participate, regardless of the number of f-electrons. The reaction is thought to proceed via cycloaddition. Indeed, the rate of the reaction is characterized by a highly negative entropy of activation, indicating an ordered transition state. For metals unsuited for redox, sigma bond metathesis provides a pathway for introducing substituents.

The reaction attracted much attention because hydrocarbons are normally unreactive substrates, whereas some sigma-bond metatheses are facile. Unfortunately the reaction does not readily allow the introduction of functional groups. It has been suggested that dehydrocoupling reactions proceed via sigma-bond metathesis.

== See also ==
- Carbon–hydrogen bond activation
- Metal-catalyzed σ-bond rearrangement
