= Palladium black =

Names
- IUPAC name Palladium
- Other names Palladium black

Identifiers
CAS Number	7440-05-3
3D model (JSmol)	Interactive image
ChEBI	CHEBI:33363
ChemSpider	22380
EC Number	231-115-6
PubChem CID	23938
UNII	5TWQ1V240M
- InChI: InChI=1S/Pd Key: KDLHZDBZIXYQEI-UHFFFAOYSA-N
- SMILES: [Pd]

Properties
Chemical formula	Pd
Molar mass	106.42
Appearance	Black powder
Solubility	Organic solvents
- Except where otherwise noted, data are given for materials in their standard state (at 25 °C [77 °F], 100 kPa). Infobox references

Palladium black is a coarse, sponge-like form of elemental palladium which offers a large surface area for catalytic activity. It is used in organic synthesis as a catalyst for hydrogenation reactions.

The term palladium black is also used colloquially to refer to a black precipitate of elemental palladium, which forms via decomposition of various palladium complexes.

== Preparation ==
Palladium black is typically prepared from palladium(II) chloride or palladium(II)-ammonium chloride. The palladium chloride process entails the formation of palladium hydroxide using lithium hydroxide followed by reduction under hydrogen gas while the palladium(II)-ammonium chloride route employs a solution of formic acid followed by the precipitation of the catalyst using potassium hydroxide.

== See also ==
- Platinum black
- Platinum dioxide
- Platinum on carbon
- Palladium on carbon
- Rhodium-platinum oxide
