= Rhodium oxide =

Rhodium oxide can refer to:

- Rhodium(III) oxide, Rh_{2}O_{3}
- Rhodium(IV) oxide, RhO_{2}
