= Diammonium tetrachloroplatinate =

- _{2}

Names
- IUPAC name diazanium;tetrachloroplatinum(2-)
- Other names Ammonium tetrachloroplatinate(II)

Identifiers
CAS Number	13820-41-2
3D model (JSmol)	Interactive image
ChEBI	CHEBI:60147
ChemSpider	17339498
ECHA InfoCard	100.034.076
EC Number	237-499-1
Gmelin Reference	79515
PubChem CID	16211508
UNII	Z5NY20A9S2
CompTox Dashboard (EPA)	DTXSID2049216
- InChI: InChI=1S/4ClH.2H3N.Pt/h4*1H;2*1H3;/q;;;;;;+2/p-2 Key: QJIMNDWDOXTTBR-UHFFFAOYSA-L
- SMILES: [H][N+]([H])([H])[H].[H][N+]([H])([H])[H].Cl[Pt--](Cl)(Cl)Cl

Properties
Chemical formula	(NH_{4})_{2}[PtCl_{4}]
Molar mass	372.96 g·mol^{−1}
Appearance	red solid
Density	2.936 g/cm^{3}
Melting point	140–150 °C (284–302 °F; 413–423 K) (decomposes)
Solubility in water	soluble
Solubility	insoluble in alcohol

Hazards
- GHS labelling
Pictograms	(GHS05: Corrosive) (GHS06: Toxic) (GHS08: Health hazard)
Signal word	Danger
Hazard statements	H301, H315, H317, H318, H334
Precautionary statements	P280, P301, P302, P305, P310, P330, P338, P351, P352
- Except where otherwise noted, data are given for materials in their standard state (at 25 °C [77 °F], 100 kPa). Infobox references

Diammonium tetrachloroplatinate is an inorganic compound with the chemical formula (NH_{4})_{2}[PtCl_{4}].

== Structure ==
The crystals have a cubic structure with the space group P4/mmm (space group number 123).

== Synthesis ==
Diammonium tetrachloroplatinate can be synthesised by the reduction of ammonium hexachloroplatinate(IV) with ammonium oxalate:

(NH_{4})_{2}[PtCl_{6}] + (NH_{4})_{2}C_{2}O_{4} → (NH_{4})_{2}[PtCl_{4}] + 2NH_{4}Cl + 2CO_{2}

== Chemical properties ==
Diammonium tetrachloroplatinate decomposes if heated:

(NH_{4})_{2}[PtCl_{4}] → PtCl_{2} + 2NH_{4}Cl

== Uses ==
Diammonium tetrachloroplatinate was used in photography. It was also used in spectral analysis standard and in the preparation of platinum sponge and platinum catalytic agent.
