= Platinum on carbon =

Names
- Other names Pt/C, Pt-C

Identifiers
CAS Number	7440-06-4
3D model (JSmol)	Interactive image
EC Number	231-116-1
PubChem CID	23939
UNII	49DFR088MY
- InChI: InChI=1S/Pt Key: BASFCYQUMIYNBI-UHFFFAOYSA-N
- SMILES: [Pt]

Properties
Chemical formula	Pt
Appearance	Black powder
- Except where otherwise noted, data are given for materials in their standard state (at 25 °C [77 °F], 100 kPa). Infobox references

Platinum on carbon, often referred to as Pt/C, is a form of platinum used as a catalyst. The metal is supported on activated carbon in order to maximize its surface area and activity.

== Uses ==
=== Catalytic hydrogenation ===
Platinum on carbon is used for catalytic hydrogenations in organic synthesis. Examples include carbonyl reduction, nitro compound reduction, secondary amine production via nitrile reduction, and the production of saturated heterocycles from their respective aromatic compound precursors.

== Preparation ==
An aqueous solution of activated carbon and chloroplatinic acid is heated on a water bath for a few hours at 50°C, and after cooling, the solution is then made alkaline using sodium carbonate. The chloroplatinic acid is then reduced with hydrazine hydrate; however, this step is sometimes omitted in other preparations. After additional 2 hours of warming, the solution is filtered, washed with distilled water, and dried over calcium chloride to yield the catalyst. Platinum loading is typically between 5% and 10%.

== See also ==
- Platinum dioxide
- Platinum black
- Palladium on carbon
- Rhodium-platinum oxide
- CO stripping
