= Rhodium-platinum oxide =

Names
- IUPAC name Rhodium(III) oxide / Platinum(IV) oxide
- Other names Rh–Pt oxide, Nishimura's catalyst

Properties
Chemical formula	Rh_{2}O_{3} / PtO_{2}
Molar mass	253.81 / 227.09 (anhydrous)
Appearance	Black powder
- Except where otherwise noted, data are given for materials in their standard state (at 25 °C [77 °F], 100 kPa). Infobox references

Rhodium-platinum oxide (Rh–Pt oxide), or Nishimura's catalyst, is an inorganic compound used as a hydrogenation catalyst.

== Preparation ==
An aqueous solution of rhodium chloride, chloroplatinic acid, and sodium nitrate is evaporated and then fused in a porcelain dish between 460-480 °C until the oxides of nitrogen cease (≈10 minutes). The resulting solidified mass is then washed with distilled water and dilute sodium nitrate followed by drying with calcium chloride to yield the catalyst. Typically, the ratio of metals used for the catalyst is 3:1 Rh/Pt or 7:3 Rh/Pt.

== Uses ==
Rh–Pt oxide is used to reduce various aromatic compounds to their respective cycloalkanes or saturated heterocycles under mild conditions (i.e. often at room temperature and atmospheric pressure). In this application, Rh–Pt oxide is superior to other group 10 catalysts such as platinum dioxide. Furthermore, the catalyst can be used to carry out the reaction with minimal losses of oxygen-containing functional groups via hydrogenolysis.

== See also ==
- Rhodium-catalyzed hydrogenation
- Rhodium(III) oxide
- Wilkinson's catalyst
- Platinum black
- Platinum on carbon
- Palladium on carbon
- Birch reduction
