= Palladium on carbon =

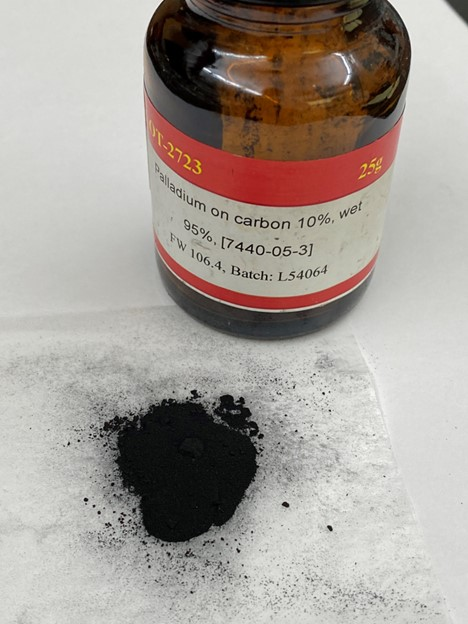

Names
- Other names Palladium on carbon, Pd/C, Pd-C

Identifiers
CAS Number	7440-05-3
UNII	5TWQ1V240M

Properties
Appearance	Black powder
Solubility	Aqua regia
- Except where otherwise noted, data are given for materials in their standard state (at 25 °C [77 °F], 100 kPa). Infobox references

Palladium on carbon, often referred to as Pd/C, is a form of palladium used as a catalyst. The metal is supported on activated carbon to maximize its surface area and activity.

== Uses ==
=== Hydrogenation ===
Palladium on carbon is used for catalytic hydrogenations in organic synthesis. Examples include reductive amination, carbonyl reduction, nitro compound reduction, the reduction of imines and Schiff bases and debenzylation reactions.

=== Hydrogenolysis ===
Palladium on carbon is a common catalyst for hydrogenolysis. Such reactions are helpful in deprotection strategies. Particularly common substrates for hydrogenolysis are benzyl ethers:

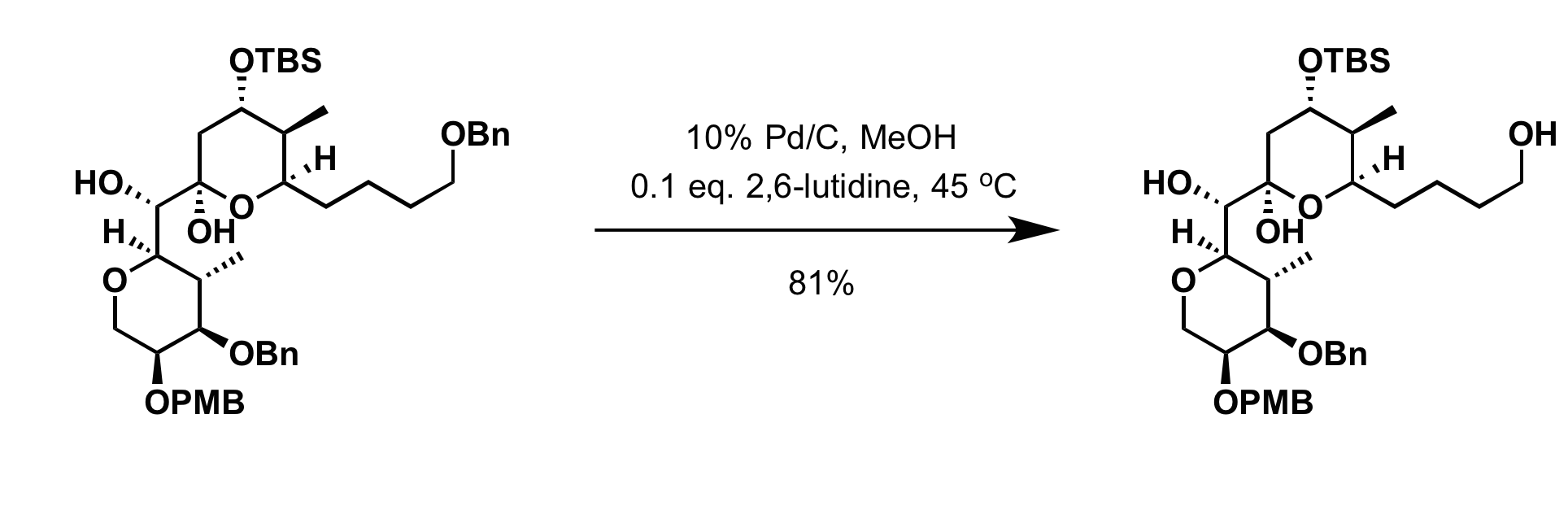

Other labile substituents are also susceptible to cleavage by this reagent.

=== Coupling reactions ===
Palladium on carbon is also used for coupling reactions. Examples include the Suzuki reaction and Stille reaction.

== Preparation ==
A solution of palladium chloride and hydrochloric acid is combined with aqueous suspension of activated carbon. The palladium(II) is then reduced by the addition of formaldehyde. Palladium loading is typically between 5% and 10%. Often the catalyst mixture is stored moist.

== See also ==
- Palladium black
- Platinum on carbon
- Platinum dioxide
- Rhodium-platinum oxide
- Lindlar catalyst
- Raney nickel
- Urushibara nickel
