= Ammonium hexabromoplatinate =

Names
- IUPAC name Ammonium hexabromoplatinate
- Other names: Ammonium hexabromoplatinate(IV); Diammonium hexabromoplatinate

Identifiers
CAS Number	17363-02-9
3D model (JSmol)	Interactive image
ECHA InfoCard	100.037.615
EC Number	241-394-6
PubChem CID	167646
CompTox Dashboard (EPA)	DTXSID0094027
- InChI: InChI=1S/6BrH.2H3N.Pt/h6*1H;2*1H3;/q;;;;;;;;+4/p-4 Key: YLDMEZNZYLWNNL-UHFFFAOYSA-J
- SMILES: [NH4+].[NH4+].[Br-].[Br-].[Br-].[Br-].[Br-].[Br-].[Pt+4]

Properties
Chemical formula	(NH_{4})_{2}PtBr_{6}
Molar mass	710.586 g·mol^{−1}
Appearance	red-brown solid
Density	4.26 g/mL
Melting point	145 °C (293 °F; 418 K) (decomposes)
Solubility in water	poorly soluble

Structure
Crystal structure	cubic
Space group	Fm3̅m
Lattice constant	a = 10.2917 Å α = 90°, β = 90°, γ = 90°

Hazards
- GHS labelling
Pictograms	(GHS07: Exclamation mark)
Signal word	Warning
Hazard statements	H302, H312, H315, H319, H332, H335
Precautionary statements	P261, P264, P264+P265, P270, P271, P280, P301+P317, P302+P352, P304+P340, P305+P351+P338, P317, P319, P321, P330, P332+P317, P337+P317, P362+P364, P403+P233, P405, P501
- Except where otherwise noted, data are given for materials in their standard state (at 25 °C [77 °F], 100 kPa). Infobox references

Ammonium hexabromoplatinate is an inorganic compound with the chemical formula (NH_{4})_{2}PtBr_{6}.

== Structure ==
Ammonium hexabromoplatinate adopts a face centered cubic structure. A phase transition occurs at 57.4 K (−215.8 °C; −356.3 °F); this does not occur in the related hexachloroplatinate complex.
