= Ammonium formate =

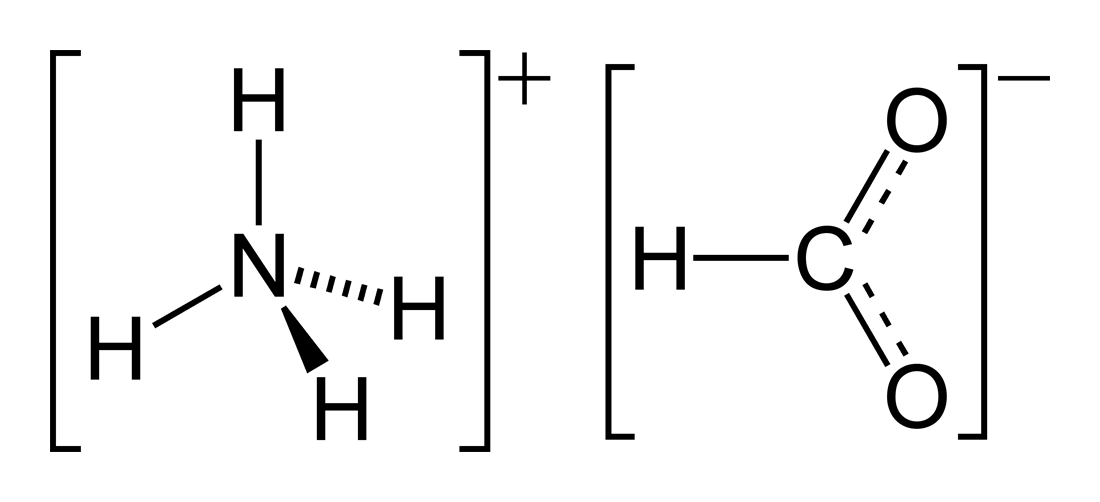
- Skeletal formula of ammonium formate

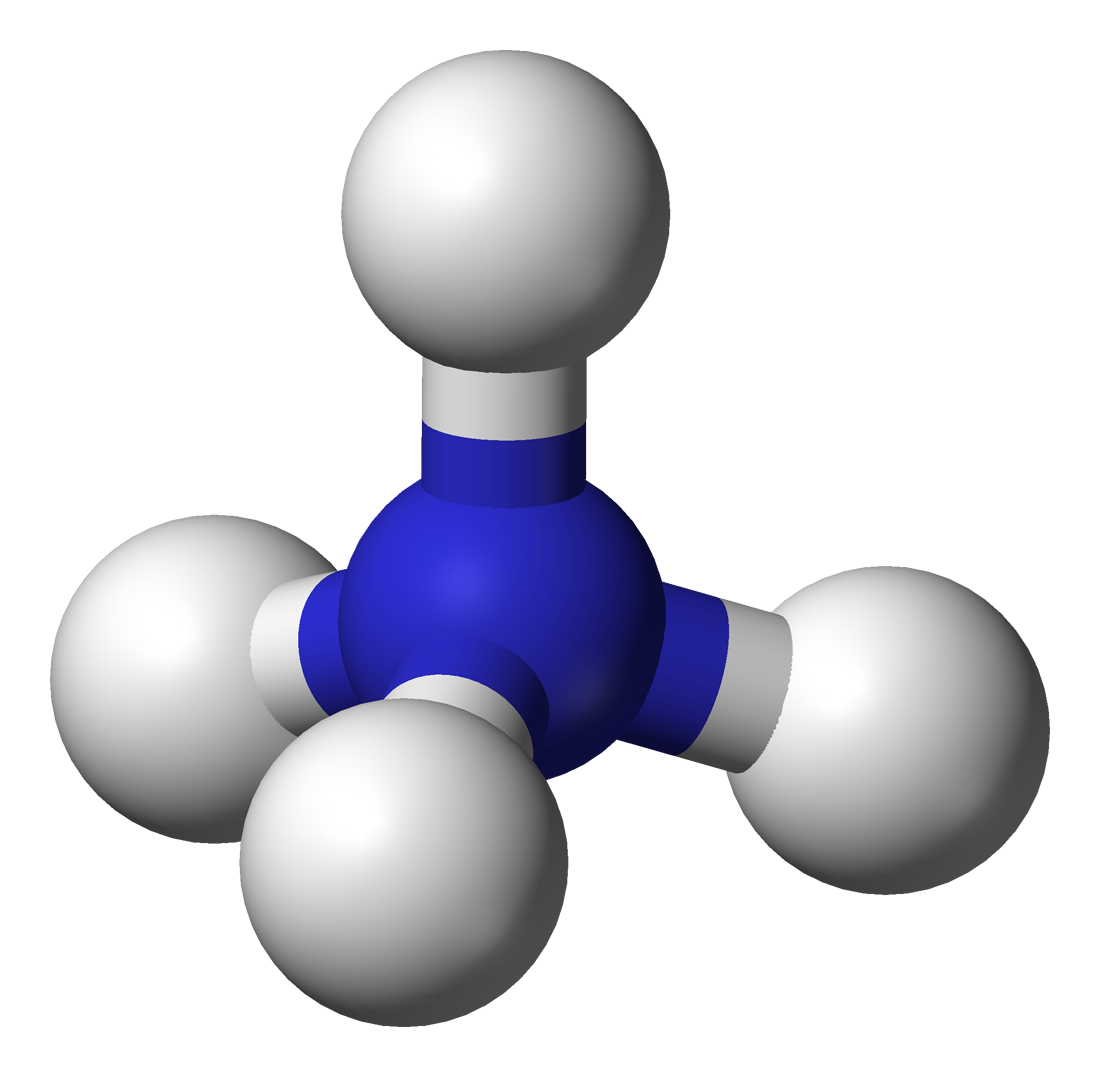
Ball-and-stick model of the ammonium cation
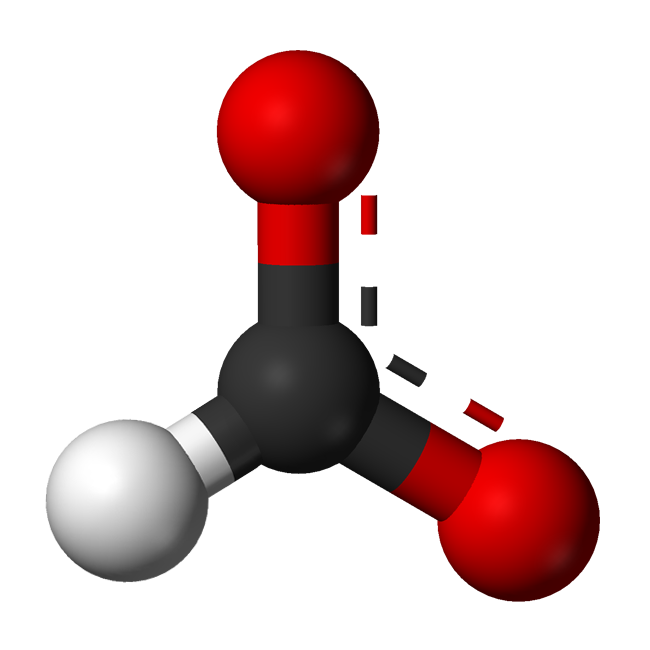
Ball-and-stick model of the formate anion
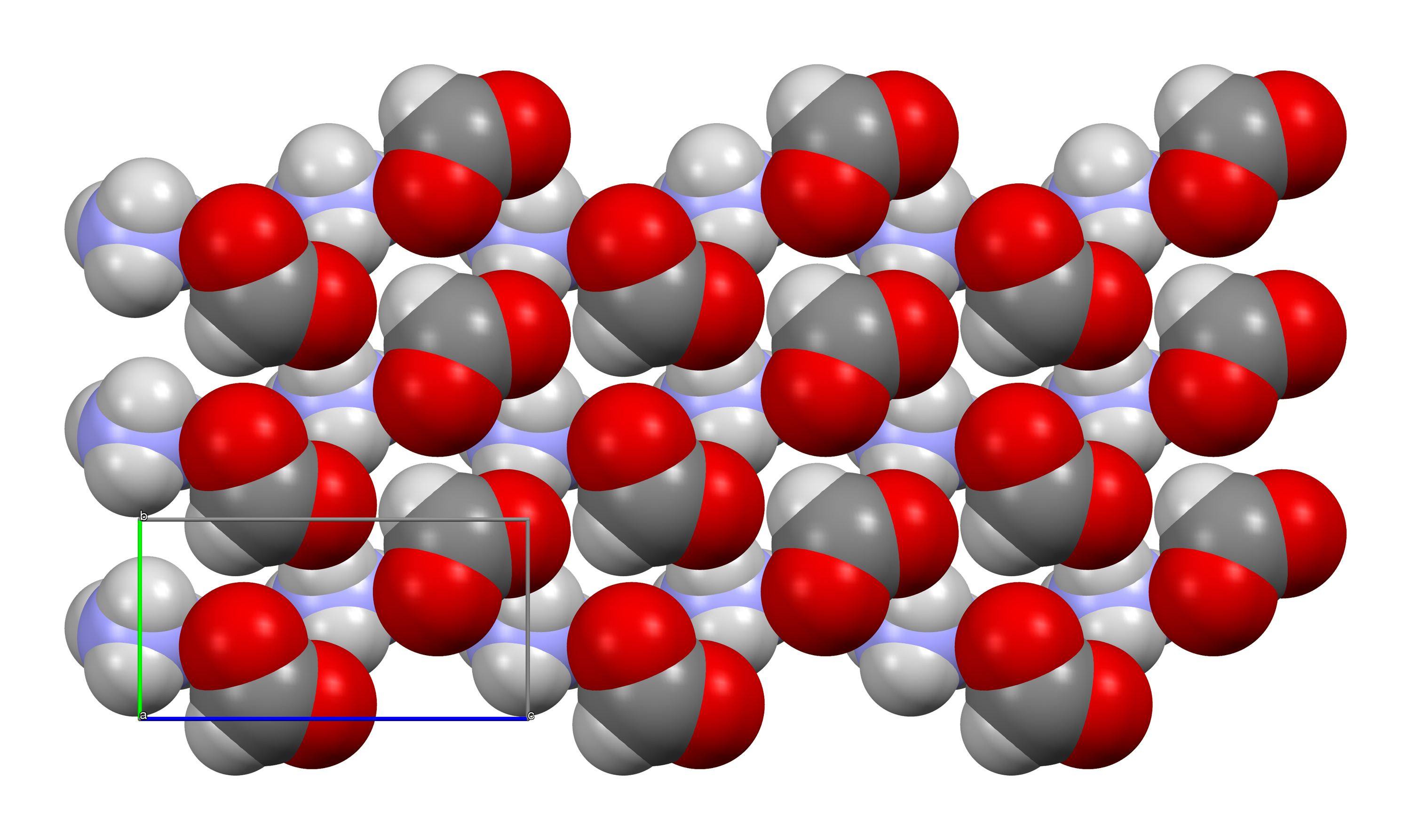

Names
- IUPAC name Ammonium formate

Identifiers
CAS Number	540-69-2
3D model (JSmol)	Interactive image; Interactive image
ChemSpider	10442
ECHA InfoCard	100.007.959
PubChem CID	2723923
RTECS number	BQ6650000
UNII	3801F9644E
CompTox Dashboard (EPA)	DTXSID6029624
- InChI: InChI=1S/CH2O2.H3N/c2-1-3;/h1H,(H,2,3);1H3 Key: VZTDIZULWFCMLS-UHFFFAOYSA-N; InChI=1/CH2O2.H3N/c2-1-3;/h1H,(H,2,3);1H3 Key: VZTDIZULWFCMLS-UHFFFAOYAT
- SMILES: O=CO.N; C(=O)O.N

Properties
Chemical formula	CH_{5}NO_{2}
Molar mass	63.056 g·mol^{−1}
Appearance	White monoclinic crystals, deliquescent
Odor	Slightly ammoniac
Density	1.26 g/cm^{3}
Melting point	116 °C (241 °F; 389 K)
Boiling point	180 °C (356 °F; 453 K) decomposes
Solubility in water	(grams per 100g of water)102g(0 °C); 142.7 g (20 °C); 202.4 g (40 °C); 516 g (80 °C)
Solubility in other solvents	Soluble in liquid ammonia, ethanol, diethyl ether

Thermochemistry
Std enthalpy of formation (Δ_{f}H^{⦵}_{298})	−556.18 kJ/mol

Hazards
- GHS labelling
Pictograms	(GHS07: Exclamation mark)
Signal word	Warning
Hazard statements	H315, H319, H335
Precautionary statements	P261, P305+P351+P338
NFPA 704 (fire diamond)	2 1 1
- Lethal dose or concentration (LD, LC)
LD_{50} (median dose)	410 mg/kg (mice, intravenous)
Safety data sheet (SDS)	JT Baker MSDS
- Except where otherwise noted, data are given for materials in their standard state (at 25 °C [77 °F], 100 kPa). verify (what is ?) Infobox references

Ammonium formate, NH_{4}HCO_{2}, is the ammonium salt of formic acid. It is a colorless, hygroscopic, crystalline solid.

== Reductive amination ==
Acetone can be transformed into isopropylamine as follows:

CH_{3}C(O)CH_{3} + 2 HCO_{2}^{−} ^{+}NH_{4} → (CH_{3})_{2}CHNHCHO + 2 H_{2}O + NH_{3} + CO_{2}
(CH_{3})_{2}CHNHCHO + H_{2}O → (CH_{3})_{2}CHNH_{2} + HCO_{2}H

== Uses ==
Pure ammonium formate decomposes into formamide and water when heated, and this is its primary use in industry. Formic acid can also be obtained by reacting ammonium formate with a dilute acid, and since ammonium formate is also produced from formic acid, it can serve as a way of storing formic acid.

Ammonium formate can also be used in palladium on carbon (Pd/C) reduction of functional groups. In the presence of Pd/C, ammonium formate decomposes to hydrogen, carbon dioxide, and ammonia. This hydrogen gas is adsorbed onto the surface of the palladium metal, where it can react with various functional groups. For example, alkenes can be reduced to alkanes, formaldehyde to methanol, and nitro compounds to amines. Activated single bonds to heteroatoms can also be replaced by hydrogens (hydrogenolysis).

Ammonium formate can be used for reductive amination of aldehydes and ketones (Leuckart reaction), by the following reaction:

Ammonium formate can be used as a mobile phase additive in high performance liquid chromatography (HPLC), and is suitable for use with liquid chromatography-mass spectrometry (LC/MS). The pK_{a} values of formic acid and the ammonium ion are 3.8 and 9.2, respectively.

== Reactions ==
When heated, ammonium formate eliminates water, forming formamide. Upon further heating, it forms hydrogen cyanide (HCN) and water. A side reaction of this is the decomposition of formamide to carbon monoxide (CO) and ammonia.
