= Nitrile reduction =

Organic reduction

In nitrile reduction a nitrile is reduced to either an amine or an aldehyde with a suitable chemical reagent.

== Catalytic hydrogenation ==
The catalytic hydrogenation of nitriles is often the most economical route available for the production of primary amines. Catalysts for the reaction often include group 10 metals such as Raney nickel, palladium black, or platinum dioxide. However, other catalysts, such as cobalt boride, also can be regioselective for primary amine production:

R-C≡N + 2 H_{2} → R-CH_{2}NH_{2}

A commercial application of this technology includes the production of hexamethylenediamine from adiponitrile, a precursor to Nylon 66.

Depending on reaction conditions, reactive intermediate imines can also undergo attack by amine products to afford secondary and tertiary amines:

2 R-C≡N + 4 H_{2} → (R-CH_{2})_{2}NH + NH_{3}
3 R-C≡N + 6 H_{2} → (R-CH_{2})_{3}N + 2 NH_{3}

Such reactions proceed via enamine intermediates. The most important reaction condition for selective primary amine production is catalyst choice. Other important factors include solvent choice, solution pH, steric effects, temperature, and the pressure of hydrogen.

== Stoichiometric reductions ==
=== To amines ===
Reducing agents for the non-catalytic conversion to amines include lithium aluminium hydride, lithium borohydride, diborane, or elemental sodium in alcohol solvents.

=== To aldehydes ===
Nitriles can also be converted to aldehydes by reduction and hydrolysis. The Stephen aldehyde synthesis uses Tin(II) chloride and hydrochloric acid to yield an aldehyde via the hydrolysis of a resulting iminium salt. Aldehydes can also form using a hydrogen donor followed by in-situ hydrolysis of an imine. Useful reagents for this reaction include formic acid with a hydrogenation catalysis or metal hydrides, which are used to add one mol of hydrogen to the nitrile. For example, sodium borohydride reduces nitriles in alcoholic solvents with a CoCl_{2} catalyst or Raney nickel.

=== With diisobutylaluminium hydride ===
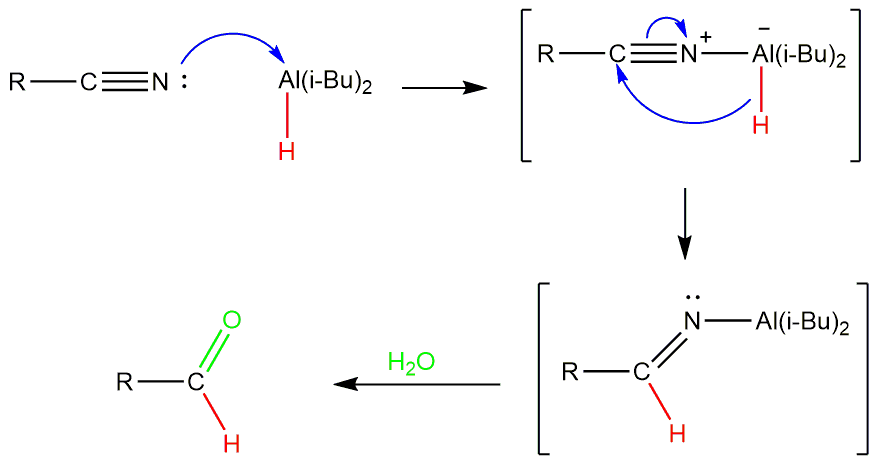
The mechanism for the reduction of a nitrile to an aldehyde with DIBAL-H.

The hydride reagent Diisobutylaluminium hydride, or DIBAL-H, is commonly used to convert nitriles to the aldehyde. Regarding the proposed mechanism, DIBAL forms a Lewis acid-base adduct with the nitrile by formation of an N-Al bond. The hydride is then transferred to the carbon of the nitrile. Aqueous workup produce the desired aldehyde and ammonia.

== Electrochemical methods ==
Benzyl nitriles can also be reduced electrochemically.

== See also ==
- Urushibara cobalt
- Imine
