= Anion exchange membrane electrolysis =

Splitting of water using a semipermeable membrane

AEM electrolyzer
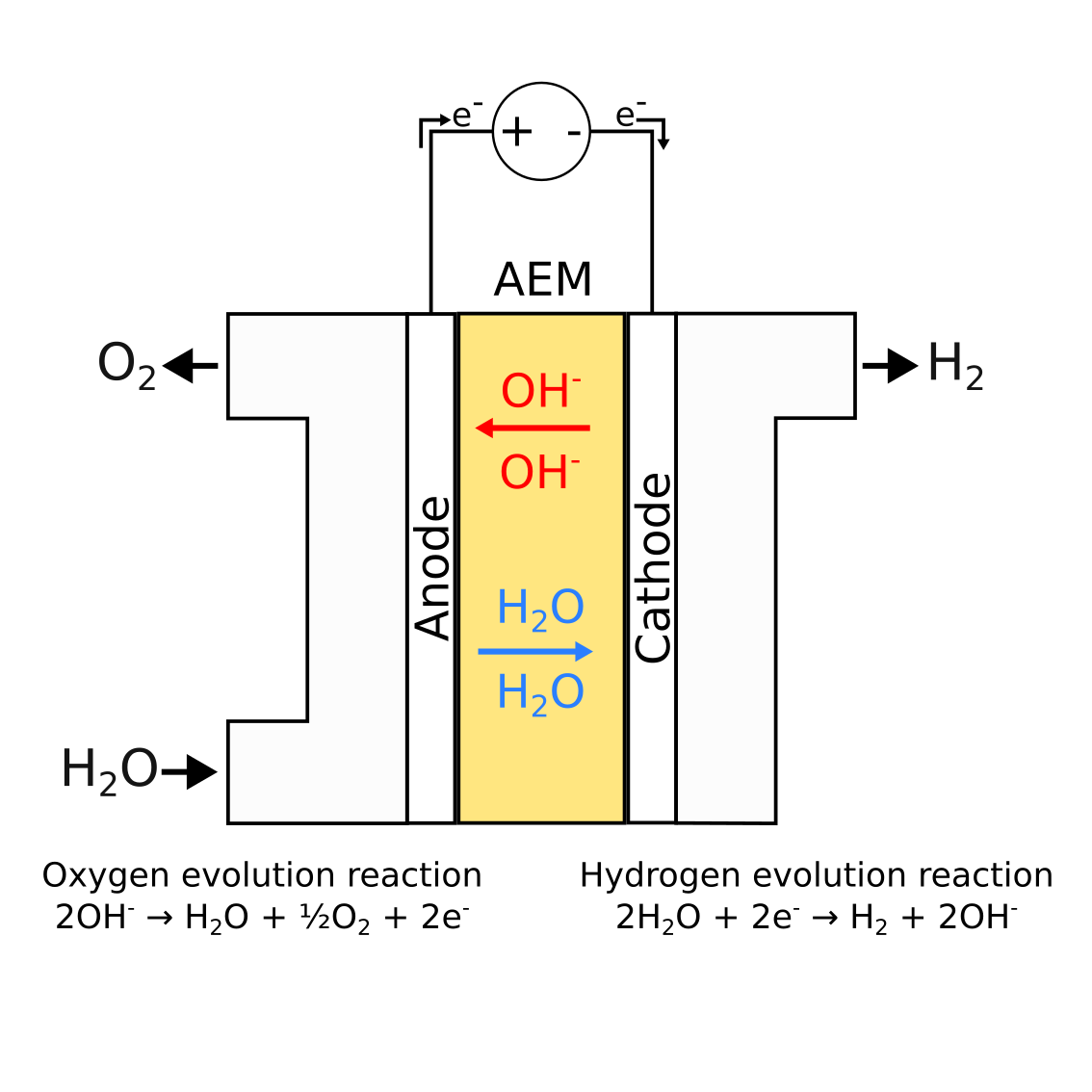
- AEM electrolyzer working principle with HER and OER.

Materials
- Electrolysis type: AEM electrolysis
- Membrane: Solid polymer membrane
- Anode distributor: Nickel or titanium
- Cathode distributor: Graphite or nickel
- Anode catalyst: Nickel or iridium
- Cathode catalyst: Platinum/carbon or nickel
- Anode PTL: Nickel
- Cathode PTL: Carbon
- Electrolyte: KOH or pure water

State-of-the-art performance
- Current density: 1–2 A/cm^{2}
- Voltage: 1.5–1.9 V
- Power density: 1.5–3.8 W/cm^{2}
- Temperature: 40–90 °C
- Pressure: 1–30 bar
- Specific H_{2} production: 0.25–1 Nm^{3}/h
- Current degradation rate: ~75 μV/h
- Desired degradation rate: <1 μV/h
- Current lifetime: ~2000 h
- Desired lifetime: ~100,000 h
- Current H_{2} purity: ~99.99%
- Desired H_{2} purity: > 99.9999%

Anion exchange membrane (AEM) electrolysis is the electrolysis of water that utilises a semipermeable membrane that conducts hydroxide ions (OH^{−}) called an anion exchange membrane. Like a proton-exchange membrane (PEM), the membrane separates the products, provides electrical insulation between electrodes, and conducts ions. Unlike PEM, AEM conducts hydroxide ions. AEM electrolysis is still in the early research and development stage, while alkaline water electrolysis is mature and PEM electrolysis is in the commercial stage. There is less academic literature on pure-water fed AEM electrolysers compared to the usage of KOH solution. One advantage of AEM water electrolysis is that a high-cost noble metal catalyst is not required, low-cost transition metal catalyst can be used instead. AEM electrolysis is similar to alkaline water electrolysis, which uses a non-ion-selective separator instead of an anion-exchange membrane.

== Reactions ==
The Oxygen Evolution Reaction (OER) involves complex processes and a high energy barrier and thus a high overpotential. The performance of the AEM electrolyser largely depends on OER. The overpotential of OER can be lowered with a suitable catalyst. Researches shows that Ni-Fe based catalysts are one of the most promising catalysts for OER in AEM electrolyser. Hydrogen evolution reaction (HER) kinetics in alkaline solutions is usually faster.

=== Anode reaction ===
$4\mathrm{OH}^- \rightarrow 3\mathrm{OH}^{-} + \mathrm{e}^- + \mathrm{OH}^*$	$\left ( 1 \right )$

$\mathrm{OH}^* + 3\mathrm{OH}^* + \mathrm{e}^- \rightarrow 2\mathrm{OH}^- + \mathrm{e}^- + \mathrm{O}^* + \mathrm{H}_2 \mathrm{O}$	$\left ( 2 \right )$

$\mathrm{O}^* + \mathrm{H}_2 \mathrm{O} + 2\mathrm{OH}^- + 2\mathrm{e}^- \rightarrow \mathrm{OH}^- + 3\mathrm{e}^- + \mathrm{OOH}^* + \mathrm{H}_2 \mathrm{O}$	$\left ( 3 \right )$

$\mathrm{OOH}^* + \mathrm{H}_2 \mathrm{O} + \mathrm{OH}^- + 3\mathrm{e}^- \rightarrow 4\mathrm{e}^- + 2\mathrm{H}_2 \mathrm{O} + \mathrm{O}_2$	$\left ( 4 \right )$

Where the * indicate species adsorbed to the surface of the catalyst.

=== Cathode reaction ===
The reaction starts with water adsorption and dissociation in Volmer step and either hydrogen desorption in the Tafel step or Heyrovsky step.

Volmer step: $2\mathrm{H}_2 \mathrm{O} + 2\mathrm{e}^- \rightarrow 2\mathrm{H}^* + 2\mathrm{OH}^{-}$	$\left ( 5 \right )$

Tafel step: $2\mathrm{H}^* \rightarrow \mathrm{H}_2$	$\left ( 6 \right )$

Heyrovsky step: $\mathrm{H}_2 \mathrm{O} + \mathrm{H}^* + \mathrm{e}^- \rightarrow \mathrm{H}_2 + \mathrm{OH}^-$

$\left ( 7 \right )$

== Catalysts ==
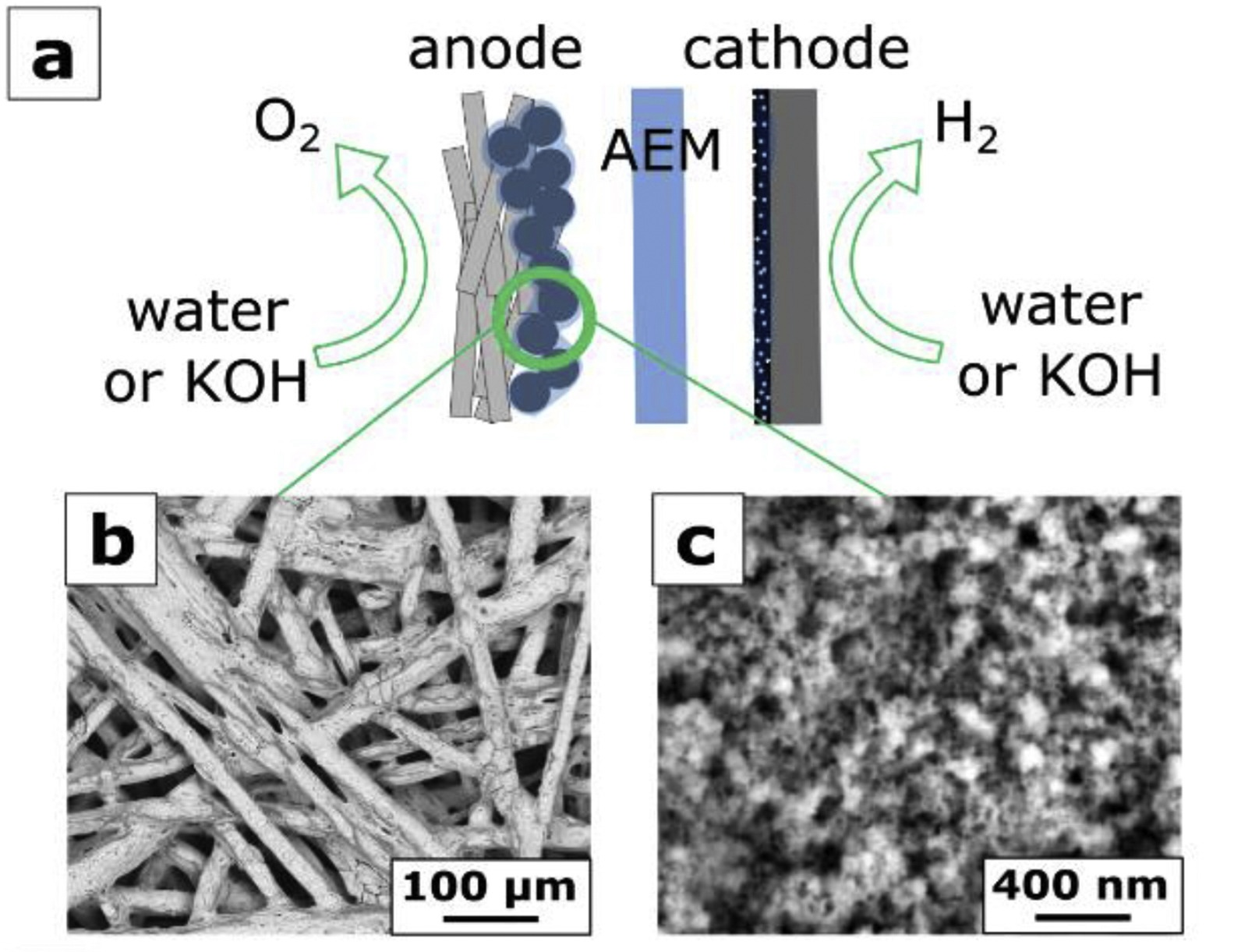
a) Schematic of a typical AEM electrolyzer structure. Water and/or KOH are fed to both the cathode and anode; oxygen (O_{2}) is produced at the anode and hydrogen (H_{2}) at the cathode. b) Metallic mesh of the anodic electrode. c) Anodic catalyst layer, composed of copper oxide particles. Image from Mayerhöfer et al., 2022 (CC BY 4.0)

Both the oxygen evolution reaction (OER) and the hydrogen evolution reaction (HER) are characterized by sluggish kinetics, thus requiring the use of highly active catalysts. High performance is typically achieved with the benchmark combination of iridium oxide (IrOx) for the anodic OER and platinum on carbon (Pt/C) for the cathodic HER, due to their high intrinsic activity.

However, the alkaline environment of AEM electrolyzers allows the use of non-platinum-group metal (non-PGM) catalysts, such as transition metal oxides of nickel (Ni), cobalt (Co), iron (Fe), and copper (Cu) for the OER, and nickel- or molybdenum-based materials for the HER. While these alternatives are economically favorable, they generally show lower intrinsic activity. Operating in a highly alkaline electrolyte (pH = 14 with 1 M KOH) and optimizing electrode structure are therefore crucial to achieving good efficiency and performance.

Although the Pt/C catalyst deposited on a porous transport layer (PTL) made of carbon paper currently demonstrates good HER performance, research is increasingly focusing on nickel (Ni) or nickel-iron (NiFe) catalysts in order to reduce costs and environmental impact. The catalyst is generally applied to the cathode by spray-coating, since the carbon paper offers a relatively smooth and flat surface, controlled porosity, and good adhesion of the materials.

Spray-coating is not suitable for the anode, since the highly porous and irregular surface of the nickel metal felt (commonly used as the anodic PTL) does not allow for the formation of a thin and uniform catalyst layer, making thickness and distribution difficult to control. Therefore, the most common deposition methods for the anode are immersion, impregnation, or electrodeposition. The objective of the deposition process is to maximize the ratio of electrochemical active surface area to the amount of catalyst employed.

The use of iridium oxide (IrOx) as an anodic catalyst, as in PEM electrolyzers, is not necessary here: the alkaline environment enables good reaction activity with more affordable materials such as nickel oxides (NiOx) and nickel-iron (NiFe). The porosity of the electrode and PTL is key to effectively managing the oxygen bubbles formed during the reaction. Poor oxygen bubble removal can severely hinder performance, as hydroxide ions cannot reach the active sites of the anodic catalyst. Operation with potassium hydroxide (KOH) can improve not only the membrane ionic conductivity but also the electrode performance. Bubble detachment from active sites occurs at smaller sizes when using KOH, which promotes more effective gas evacuation and improved contact between the electrolyte and the catalyst's active surface.

== Anion exchange membrane ==
Hydroxide ion intrinsically has lower mobility than H^{+}, increasing ion exchange capacity can compensate for this lower mobility but also increase swelling and reduce membrane mechanical stability. Cross-linking membranes can compensate for membrane mechanical instability. The quaternary ammonium (QA) headgroup is commonly employed to attach polymer matrices in AEM. The head group allows anions but not cations to be transported. QA AEMs have low chemical stability because they are susceptible to OH^{−} attack. Promising head group candidates include imidazolium-based head group and nitrogen-free head groups such as phosphonium, sulphonium, and ligand-metal complex. Most QAs and imidazolium groups degrade in alkaline environments by Hofmann degradation, S_{N}2 reaction, or ring-opening reaction, especially at high temperatures and pH.

Polymeric AEM backbones are cationic-free base polymers. Poly(arylene ether)-based backbones, polyolefin-based backbones, polyphenylene-based backbones, and backbones containing cationic moieties are some examples.

Some of the best-performing AEMs are HTMA-DAPP, QPC-TMA, m-PBI, and PFTP.

== Membrane electrode assembly ==
A membrane electrode assembly (MEA) is made of an anode and cathode catalyst layer with a membrane layer in between. The catalyst layer can be deposited on the membrane or the substrate. Catalyst-coated substrate (CCS) and catalyst-coated membrane (CCM) are two approaches to preparing MEA. A substrate must conduct electricity, support the catalyst mechanically, and remove gaseous products.

Nickel is typically used as a substrate for AEM, while titanium is for PEM; both nickel and titanium can be used on AEM. Carbon materials are not suitable for the anode side because of their degradation by HO^{−} ions, which are nucleophiles. On the cathode, nickel, titanium, and carbon can be readily used. The catalyst layer is typically made by mixing catalyst powder and ionomer to produce an ink or slurry that is applied by spraying or painting. Other methods include electrodeposition, magnetron sputtering, chemical electroless plating, and screen printing onto the substrate.

Ionomers act as a binder for the catalyst, substrate support, and membrane, which also provide OH^{−} conducting ions and increase electrocatalytic activities.

== Commercialisation ==
Anion exchange membrane electrolysers moved from laboratory research towards commercial products during the 2020s. Across nine commercially available AEM stacks, rated capacities range from the sub-kilowatt to the multi-kilowatt scale with specific energy consumption of roughly 45 to 56 kWh per kilogram of hydrogen. Manufacturers disclose operating parameters unevenly: only a minority publish the electrolyte concentration behind their rated figures, and only three publish the operating temperature, which limits direct comparison.

== Advantages and challenges ==
=== Advantages ===
AEM is water electrolysis method that combines the lower cost catalysts of alkaline water electrolysis (AWE) with the higher current density of polymer electrolyte membrane (PEM) electrolysis. Polymer electrolyte membrane electrolysis uses expensive platinum-group metals (PGMs) such as platinum, iridium, and ruthenium as a catalyst. Iridium, for instance, is more scarce than platinum; a 100 MW PEM electrolyser is expected to require 150 kg of Iridium, which will cost an estimated 7 million USD. Like alkaline water electrolysis, electrodes in AEM electrolysis operate in an alkaline environment, which allows non-noble, low-cost catalysts based on Ni, Fe, Co, Mn, Cu, etc. to be used.

AEM electrolyser can run on pure water or slightly alkaline solutions (0.1-1M KOH/NaOH) unlike highly concentrated alkaline solutions (5M KOH/NaOH) in AWE. This reduces the risk of leakage. Using an alkaline solution, usually KOH/NaOH increases membrane conductivity and adds a hydroxide ion conductive pathway, which increases the utilisation of catalyst. The current density of an AEM electrolyser without a PGM catalyst operating at 1 A/cm^{2} was reported to require 1.8 volts and 1.57 volts in pure water-fed and 1 M KOH-fed, respectively. Electrolyte can be fed on both anode and cathode side or anode side only.

In the zero-gap design of AWE, the electrodes are separated by a diaphragm which separates the gases. The diaphragm allows only water and hydroxide ions to pass through, but does not eliminate gas cross-over.

AEM based on an aromatic polymer backbone is promising due to its significant cost reduction. Compare to Nafion membrane use in PEM, the production of Nafion required highly toxic chemicals, which increased the cost (>$1000/m^{2}) and fluorocarbon gas is produced at the production stage of tetrafluoroethylene, which poses a strong environmental impact. Fluorinated raw materials are inessential for AEM, allowing for a wider selection of low-cost polymer chemistry.

=== Challenges ===
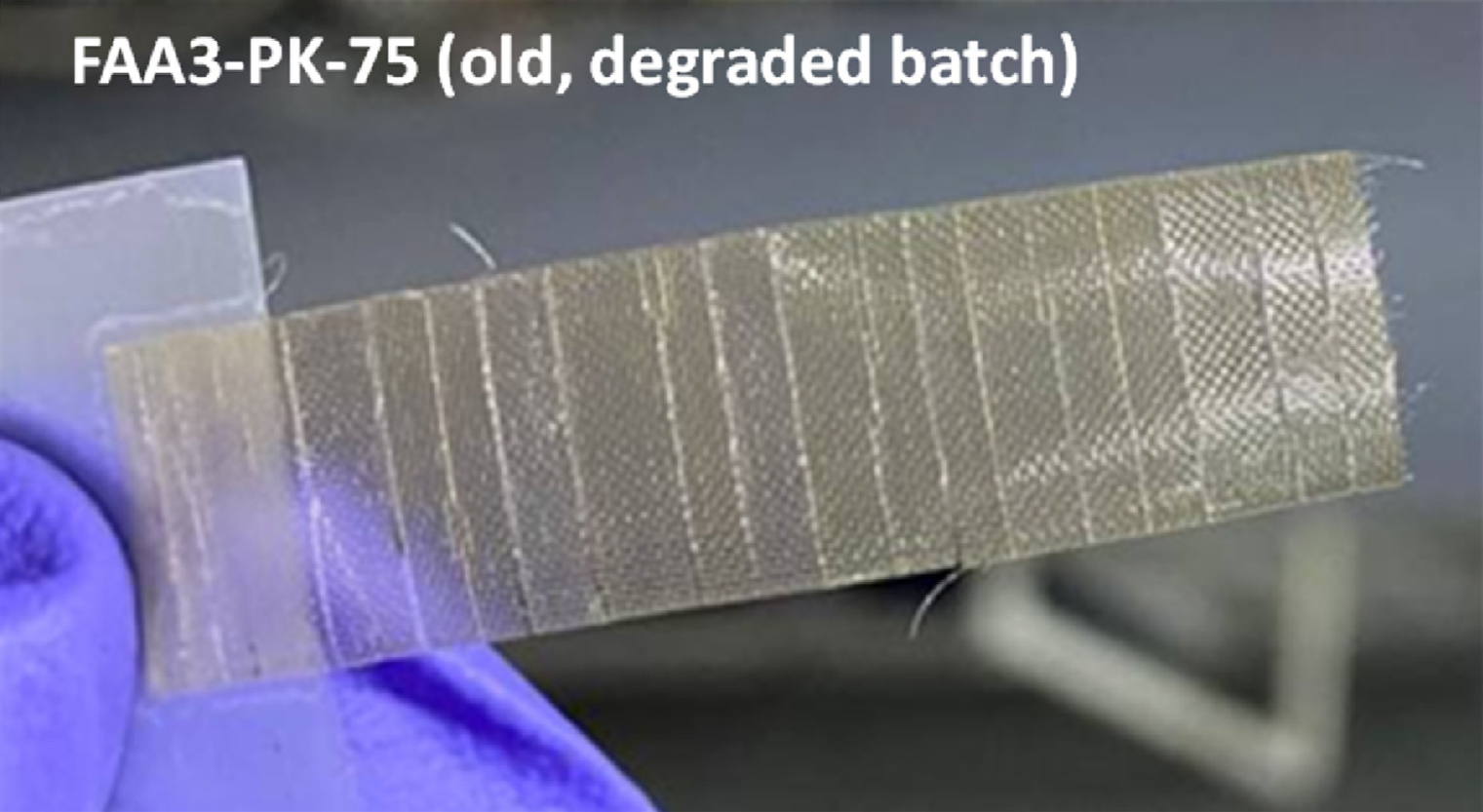
Degraded AEM Fumatech FAA3-PK-75 after mechanical strength testing to evaluate the mechanical properties of the membrane.

The major technical challenge facing a consumer level AEM electrolyser is the short device lifetime or longevity. The lifetimes of PEM electrolyser stacks range from 20,000 h to 80,000 h. Literature surveys have found that AEM electrolyser durability is demonstrated to be >2000 h, >12,000 h, and >700 h for pure water-fed (Pt group catalyst on anode and cathode), concentrated KOH-fed, and 1wt% K_{2}CO_{3}-fed respectively.

In particular, many AEM breakdown at temperatures higher than 60 °C, AEM that can tolerate the presence of O_{2}, high pH, and temperatures exceeding 60 °C are needed.

Like PEM electrolyzers, gas cross-over is an issue. Gas cross-over is when oxygen gas flows back through the membrane to the hydrogen half-cell and reacts on the cathode side to form water, which reduces the efficiency of the cell. Gas cross-over can pose a safety hazard as a gas mixture of greater than 4%mol hydrogen is explosive.

== See also ==
- Electrochemistry
- Electrochemical engineering
- Electrolysis
- Hydrogen production
- Photocatalytic water splitting
- Timeline of hydrogen technologies
- Electrolysis of water
- PEM fuel cell
- proton-exchange membrane
- Hydrogen economy
- High-pressure electrolysis
