= Reduction of nitro compounds =

Chemical reaction

The reduction of nitro compounds are chemical reactions of wide interest in organic chemistry. The conversion can be affected by many reagents. The nitro group was one of the first functional groups to be reduced. Alkyl and aryl nitro compounds behave differently. Most useful is the reduction of aryl nitro compounds.

== Aromatic nitro compounds ==
=== Reduction to anilines ===

The reduction of nitroaromatics is conducted on an industrial scale. Many methods exist, such as:

- Catalytic hydrogenation using: Raney nickel or palladium-on-carbon, platinum(IV) oxide, or Urushibara nickel.
- Iron in acidic media.
- Sodium hydrosulfite
- Sodium sulfide (or hydrogen sulfide and base). Illustrated by the selective reduction of dinitrophenol to the nitroaminophenol.
- Tin(II) chloride
- Titanium(III) chloride
- Samarium
- Hydroiodic acid

Metal hydrides are typically not used to reduce aryl nitro compounds to anilines because they tend to produce azo compounds. (See below)

=== Reduction to hydroxylamines ===
Several methods have been described for the production of aryl hydroxylamines from aryl nitro compounds:

- Raney nickel and hydrazine at 0-10 °C
- Electrolytic reduction
- Zinc metal in aqueous ammonium chloride
- Catalytic Rhodium on carbon with excess hydrazine monohydrate at room temperature

=== Reduction to hydrazine compounds ===
Treatment of nitroarenes with excess zinc metal results in the formation of N,N'-diarylhydrazine.

=== Reduction to azo compounds ===
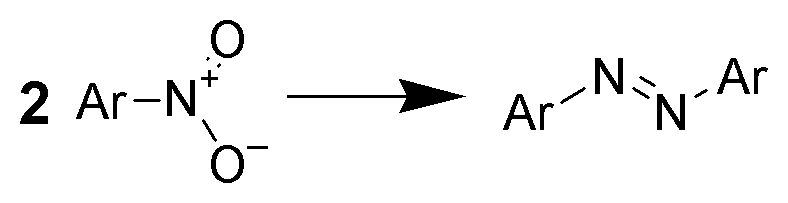

Treatment of aromatic nitro compounds with metal hydrides gives good yields of azo compounds. For example, one could use:

- Lithium aluminium hydride
- Zinc metal with sodium hydroxide. (Excess zinc will reduce the azo group to a hydrazino compound.)

== Aliphatic nitro compounds ==
=== Reduction to hydrocarbons ===
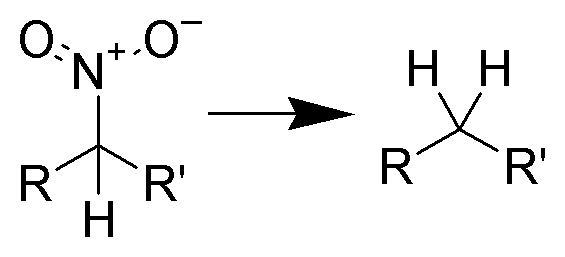

Hydrodenitration (replacement of a nitro group with hydrogen) is difficult to achieve but can be affected by catalytic hydrogenation over platinum on silica gel at high temperatures. The reaction can also be effected through radical reaction with tributyltin hydride and a radical initiator, AIBN as an example.

=== Reduction to amines ===
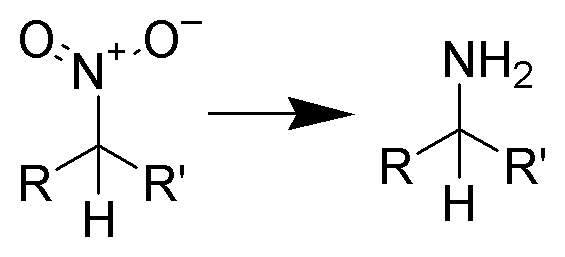

Aliphatic nitro compounds can be reduced to aliphatic amines by several reagents:

- Catalytic hydrogenation using platinum(IV) oxide (PtO_{2}) or Raney nickel
- Iron metal in refluxing acetic acid
- Samarium diiodide
- Raney nickel, platinum on carbon, or zinc dust and formic acid or ammonium formate

α,β-Unsaturated nitro compounds can be reduced to saturated amines by:

- Catalytic hydrogenation over palladium-on-carbon
- Iron metal
- Lithium aluminium hydride (Note: Hydroxylamines and oximes are typical impurities.)
- Lithium borohydride or sodium borohydride and trimethylsilyl chloride
- Red-Al

=== Reduction to hydroxylamines ===
Aliphatic nitro compounds can be reduced to aliphatic hydroxylamines using diborane.

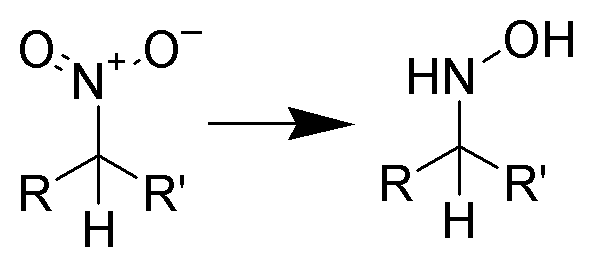

The reaction can also be carried out with zinc dust and ammonium chloride:

R-NO_{2} + 4 NH_{4}Cl + 2 Zn → R-NH-OH + 2 ZnCl_{2} + 4 NH_{3} + H_{2}O

=== Reduction to oximes ===
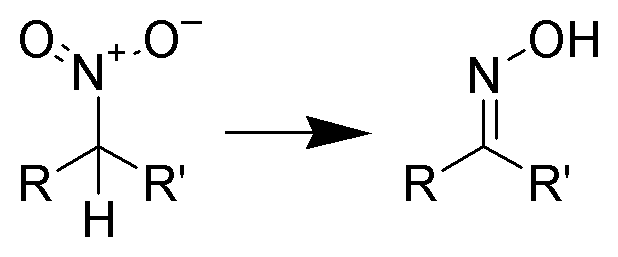

Nitro compounds are typically reduced to oximes using metal salts, such as tin(II) chloride or chromium(II) chloride. Additionally, catalytic hydrogenation using a controlled amount of hydrogen can generate oximes.
