= Cobalt boride =

Names
- IUPAC name Cobalt boride

Identifiers
CAS Number	CoB: 12006-77-8
3D model (JSmol)	CoB: Interactive image
ChemSpider	CoB: 103867615
EC Number	CoB: 235-722-7
PubChem CID	CoB: 13628825
CompTox Dashboard (EPA)	CoB: DTXSID101315491
- InChI: InChI=1S/B.Co Key: HZEIHKAVLOJHDG-UHFFFAOYSA-N
- SMILES: CoB: B#[Co]

Properties
Chemical formula	CoB
Molar mass	69.744
Appearance	Refractory Solid
Density	7.25 g/cm^{3}
Melting point	1,460 °C (2,660 °F; 1,730 K)
- Except where otherwise noted, data are given for materials in their standard state (at 25 °C [77 °F], 100 kPa). Infobox references

Cobalt borides are inorganic compounds with the general formula Co_{x}B_{y}. The two main cobalt borides are CoB and Co_{2}B. These are refractory materials.

== Applications ==
=== Materials science ===
Cobalt borides are known to be exceptionally resistant to oxidation, a chemical property which makes them useful in the field of materials science. For instance, studies suggest cobalt boride can increase the lifespan of metal parts when used as a coating, imparting surfaces with higher corrosion and wear resistance. These properties have been exploited in the field of biomedical sciences for the design of specialized drug delivery systems.

=== Renewable energy ===
Cobalt boride has also been studied as a catalyst for hydrogen storage and fuel cell technologies.

=== Organic synthesis ===
Cobalt boride is also an effective hydrogenation catalyst used in organic synthesis. In one study, cobalt boride was found to be the most selective transition metal based catalyst available for the production of primary amines via nitrile reduction, even exceeding other cobalt containing catalysts such as Raney cobalt.

== Preparations ==
=== Materials coating ===
Cobalt boride is produced under high temperature such as 1500 °C. Coatings of cobalt boride on iron are produced by boriding, which involves first introducing a coating of FeB, Fe_{2}B. On to this iron boride coating is deposited cobalt using a pack cementation process. Cobalt boride nanoparticles in the size range of 18 to 22 nm have also been produced.

=== Catalyst ===
When used as a catalyst, cobalt boride is prepared by reducing a cobalt salt, such as cobalt(II) nitrate, with sodium borohydride. Prior to reduction, the surface area of the catalyst is maximized by supporting the salt on another material; often this material is activated carbon.

== See also ==
- Nickel boride
- Urushibara cobalt
