= Electrochemical surface area =

Catalyst surface active in redox reactions

In electrochemistry, the electrochemical surface area (ECSA) is the portion of a catalyst's surface that actively partakes in redox reactions.The surface area of a catalyst exposed to the electrolyte, known as the geometric surface area, does not fully correspond to the area involved in electrochemical reactions while the ECSA accounts for the truly active catalyst surface and offers a metric for comparing electrocatalytic materials. In particular, it allows the computation of the efficacy of the electrocatalyst and it is used for the optimization process of the performance and lifetime of catalyst layers in applications such as fuel cells, water electrolysis, and metal-air batteries.

== Theoretical principles ==
The electrochemical surface area (ECSA) is a parameter used for catalyst characterization, comparison and benchmarking. The electrochemical surface area is computed as:

$\text{ECSA} = \frac{Q_{\text{measured}}}{Q_{\text{ref}}}$

where:

- $Q_{measured}$ is the total charge transferred during the adsorption/desorption process of a probe species on the catalyst.
- $Q_{ref}$ is the specific charge density which is the charge required to cover one unit of active surface with the adsorbed species and it is used as a reference value.

This is the standard method adopted in PEM fuel cell field since the adsorption/desorption of hydrogen and CO on Pt nanoparticles is well known. However, the adsorption/desorption processes are not clear in all electrochemical applications, as in the case for non-Pt catalysts, alkaline electrolytes or supercapacitors. In those cases, ECSA estimation is based on the double-layer capacitance according to the following equation:

$\text{ECSA} = \frac{C_{\text{DL}}}{C_{\text{S}}}$

where:

- $C_{DL}$ is the double-layer capacitance.
- $C_S$ is the specific capacitance which is the capacitance of an ideal flat surface of the catalyst.

ECSA is expressed in square centimeters but it can be normalized to the geometric surface area (the ratio between ECSA and geometrical surface area is referred to as "roughness factor") or to the catalyst loading (square centimeters per milligram of catalyst).

The knowledge of the ECSA is necessary for the computation of parameters used for evaluating the performance of a catalyst such as specific activity and mass activity. The specific activity is defined as the ratio between the total current and the electrochemical surface area, and it is an indicator for the intrinsic activity of the catalyst. The higher the value, the more efficient is the catalyst at promoting the electrochemical reaction. The mass activity is instead defined as the current generated per unit mass of the catalyst active material and it is used for evaluating the utilization efficiency of the catalyst. Furthermore, the mass activity allows the comparison between the different catalytic materials regardless of their amount and it is a reference parameter for the design of electrodes. Finally, the specific and mass activities are related by the following equation:

$\text{Mass activity} = \text{Specific activity x } \frac{ECSA}{\text{mass of catalyst material}}$

== Measurement techniques ==
There are multiple methodologies for evaluating the electrochemical surface area (ECSA). The choice of the method for ECSA quantification depends on the catalyst material, the operating environment and the nature of the electrochemical reaction. All the methods can be categorized into:

- Faradaic methods which involve redox processes and are based on measurements of charge carrier transfer.
- Non-faradaic or capacitive methods which are based on the measurement of the electrochemical double-layer capacitance under conditions with no faradaic current contributions.

Both methods require performing a cyclic voltammetry (CV) which is the standard diagnostic technique to measure the ECSA. A CV is performed by scanning cyclically the electrode potential within a defined range, which is selected depending on the electrochemical characteristics of the catalyst under study in order to avoid any electrolyte decomposition and electrode degradation, and to ensure a reliable estimation of the ECSA, and by measuring the electrochemical current response of the electrode. In contrast, for batteries and supercapacitors, faradaic and capacitive methods require performing an electrochemical impedance spectroscopy (EIS) which is a standard diagnostic technique for electrochemical device characterization.

=== Hydrogen adsorption/desorption ===
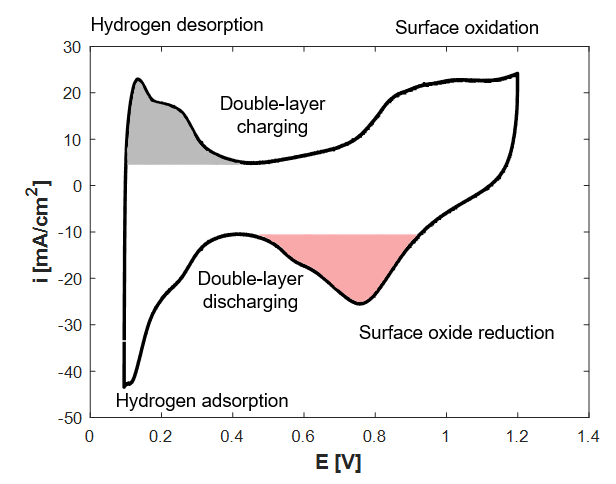
Cyclic voltammetry curve of a platinum-based electrode in acidic electrolyte.

This method relies on the measurement of the charge associated with hydrogen adsorption (H_{ads)} and desorption (H_{des}) on the catalyst surface measured during a cyclic voltammetry (CV). In particular, it considers the charge transferred during the hydrogen desorption corrected for the double-layer charging. Mathematically, this is the integral of the hydrogen desorption peak in the voltammetry response minus the double-layer charging contribution. In the figure is shown a CV curve for a generic Pt-based electrode of a hydrogen PEM fuel cell with the area evidenced in gray corresponding to the charge transferred.

The assumptions behind this method are:

- Hydrogen forms a monolayer on the catalyst surface, with one hydrogen atom adsorbed per active site.
- The charge transferred in an adsorption/desorption of each hydrogen atom corresponds to one electron.
- All catalytic surface sites are considered equally accessible to hydrogen adsorption and equally electrochemically active.
- No alteration of the surface upon adsorption takes place.

For flat, smooth (with no high porosity or roughness) platinum surfaces with no impurities/contaminants under controlled conditions, this method provides an accurate (maximum relative error of 10%) ECSA value. In the case of alloy catalysts, highly porous electrodes, or in the presence of contaminants and irreversible processes, the relative error is higher than 10% yielding to unreliable charge transfer quantification. This method is not applicable to non-Pt catalysts or to systems operating in alkaline electrolytes.

=== Surface oxide reduction ===
This method is based on the measurement of the charge associated with the electrochemical reduction of metal oxide species formed on the catalyst surface during a cyclic voltammetry (CV) scan. The charge transferred is computed by integrating the oxide reduction peak after subtracting the non-faradaic contribution (as in the case of hydrogen adsorption/desorption method). This contribution is the area colored in red in the previous figure.

The assumptions behind this method are very similar to the ones made for hydrogen adsorption/desorption method:

- Oxygen is adsorbed in a monoatomic layer with a one-to-one correspondence with surface metal atoms.
- The number of electrons transferred per oxide atom during reduction is known
- All sites involved in oxide formation and reduction are electrochemically active and accessible.
- No alteration of the surface upon adsorption takes place.

Despite this method being "generally regarded as less reliable than the one based on hydrogen adsorption", it is used for electrodes where hydrogen adsorption is hindered as Pd and Au electrodes.

=== CO stripping voltammetry ===
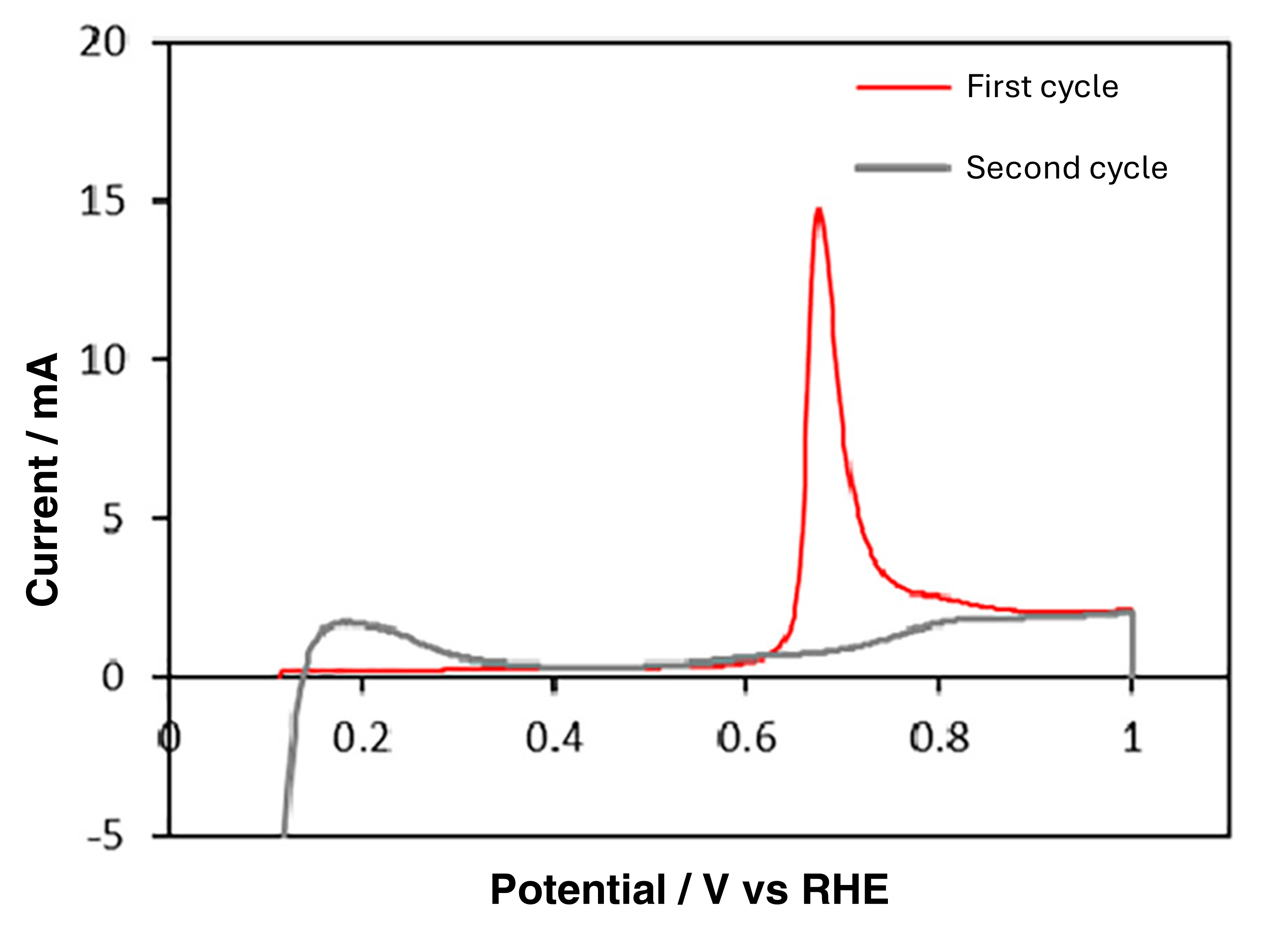
Cyclic voltammograms of a PEM fuel cell during (first cycle) and after (second cycle) CO stripping.

Carbon monoxide (CO) has a very high affinity with many metals and tends to be adsorbed on noble metal catalyst surface in the potential window in which electrochemical devices operate. This method exploit the oxidation of adsorbed CO on metal catalyst surface and consists of two steps. First, the catalyst is exposed to CO contamination in order to form a monolayer of carbon monoxide on the electrode. Afterwards, a CV scan is performed in an inert atmosphere to oxidize the adsorbed CO, process that takes name of CO stripping. The latter results in an oxidation peak in the CV curve as shown in the figure. The CO stripping charge is quantified as the difference between the total anodic charge in the potential range of CO stripping and the charge transferred in the same potential range in the absence of adsorbed CO. By looking at the figure, the first value is the integral of the red curve, while the second value is the integral of the grey curve.

CO stripping voltammetry makes the same assumptions as the previous methods applied to carbon monoxide. The main concern about this method is the possibility of electrode surface and catalytic properties alteration due to CO adsorption which could result in an overestimation or underestimation of the ECSA. CO stripping is adopted for alloy catalysts (e.g. Pt–Co, Pt–Ni), applications where hydrogen adsorption/desorption method yields inaccurate (relative error higher than 10% as stated in the hydrogen adsorption/desorption method) ECSA quantification.

=== Double-layer capacitance ===
This method estimates the electrochemical surface area by measuring the double-layer capacitance of the catalyst in an electrode potential range where the faradaic contribution is null or negligible. The procedure consists of performing cyclic voltammetry scans at different scan rates within a range of electrode potentials where the current response is purely capacitive. Then, a plot of the capacitive currents versus scan rate is made and the slope of the resulting curve, which in a purely capacitive response is linear, corresponds to the double-layer differential capacity according to:

$i = \frac{dQ}{dt} = \left(\frac{dQ}{dE}\right) \cdot \left(\frac{dE}{dt}\right) = C \cdot v$

where:

- $i$ is the measured current, in Ampere.
- $Q$ is the accumulated charge, in Coulomb.
- $t$ is time, in seconds.
- $E$ is the electrode potential, in Volts.
- $C$ is the double-layer capacitance, in Farad.
- $v$ is the scan rate in Volts per second.

Finally, the ECSA is obtained by dividing $C$ for the reference value of capacity per the unit area ($C_{ref}$).

The assumptions behind this method are:

- The current response in the selected potential window is purely capacitive meaning that no faradaic reactions occur.
- The surface behaves like an ideal capacitor and the $C_{DL}$ is linearly proportional to the electrochemically active surface area.
- The reference specific capacitance ($C_{ref}$) is constant and accurately known.
- The electrode surface is uniformly accessible to the electrolyte.

$C_{ref}$ is sensitive to the electrode potential, surface structure, electrolyte composition and concentration and experimental conditions. As a result, significant discrepancies in $C_{ref}$ values are reported in the literature, which may lead to errors of up to 100% making this method not reliable for accurate ECSA quantification. Despite these limitations, the double-layer capacitance method is still adopted in the case of catalyst materials for which a change surface state could occur upon oxide formation/reduction and metal dissolution/redeposition.

=== Underpotential deposition (UPD) ===
This method is based on the electrochemical adsorption of a metallic monolayer onto the surface of a more noble metal substrate at a potential more positive than the Nernst equilibrium potential for bulk metal deposition. This process is called underpotential deposition (UPD), and takes place when the affinity of the adsorbing metal to itself in its metallic phase is lower than the affinity of the adsorbing metal onto the metal substrate.

In practice, the UPD method consists of depositing a sub-monolayer or monolayer of a foreign metal (typically Cu, Pb, or Bi) onto the electrode surface and then measuring the charge associated with the stripping (oxidation) of the deposited species. The ECSA is calculated by integrating the UPD stripping peak and using a known reference charge corresponding to a full monolayer coverage.

The assumptions behind this method are:

- The UPD process forms a well-defined monolayer with a known surface coverage and stoichiometry.
- The interaction between the UPD species and the surface is uniform and does not lead to alloying or surface reconstruction.

The main challenges in calculating the charge associated with the deposited metal are related to the accuracy in correcting for double-layer capacitance and the hydrogen or oxygen adsorption, and in identifying the potential at which the monolayer of metal adatoms is fully formed.

The UPD method is adopted for electrodes where neither hydrogen adsorption nor oxide formation yields to an ECSA estimation with a maximum relative error of 10%, such as non-platinum group metals or alloy systems with modified surface chemistries.

=== Impedance-based methods ===
This method differs from the double-layer capacitance one in the way the $C_{DL}$ is quantified. Instead of performing a cyclic voltammetry, here the double-layer capacitance is measured through the electrochemical impedance spectroscopy (EIS) which is a standard procedure for electrochemical characterization. The measured impedance data is fitted to an equivalent electrical circuit model that includes a double-layer capacitance element, a charge transfer resistance and other components such as Warburg impedancefor diffusion effects, depending on the kind of model adopted.

The assumptions behind impedance-based methods include:

- The equivalent circuit correctly represents the physical and electrochemical behavior of the system.
- The measured capacitance arises solely from the electrochemical double layer and not from pseudocapacitive or faradaic contributions.
- The surface roughness, porosity and frequency dispersion are accounted in the model adopted.

This method is an alternative for systems where CV lead to unreliable results. However, its accuracy depends on the validity of the equivalent circuit model used and the quality (presence of scattering and disturbances during EIS measurements) of the impedance data over a wide frequency range. Despite these limitations, impedance-based ECSA evaluation is used in the fields of supercapacitors and batteries.

== See also ==
- Electrocatalyst
- Cyclic voltammetry
- Electrochemical impedance spectroscopy
- Fuel cell
- Electrolyzer
- Double-layer capacitance
