= Herbert Lindlar =

British chemist (1909–2009)

Herbert Lindlar-Wilson (15 March 1909 – 27 June 2009), better known as Herbert Lindlar, was a British-Swiss chemist. He is known in particular through the development of his catalyst for hydrogenation, as the Lindlar catalyst bears his name.

== Biography ==
Lindlar was born in Sheffield, England in March 1909 and moved to Switzerland with his family in 1909. He studied chemistry at the ETH Zurich and the University of Bern and graduated in 1939 with a thesis "about the behavior of dicarboxylic acids in the formation of ureides". He then joined the pharmaceutical company Hoffmann-La Roche. With the exception of one four-year hiatus, he worked for Hoffmann-La Roche until retirement in 1974. During these four years in Zurich and Basel, Lindlar worked as an English vice consul.

He turned 100 in March 2009 and died in June.
