= CO stripping =

Electrochemical process

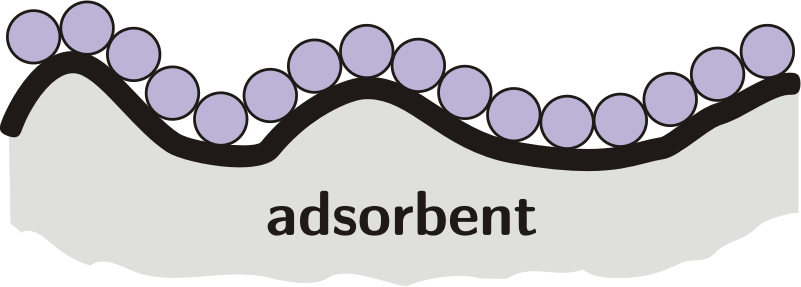
Visual representation of monolayer adsorption.

In electrochemistry, CO stripping is a voltammetry technique in which a monolayer of carbon monoxide ($\ce{CO}$) already adsorbed on the surface of an electrocatalyst is electrochemically oxidized and thus removed from the surface. A well-known process of this type is CO stripping on Pt/C electrocatalysts in which the electrooxidation peak occurs somewhere between 0.5 and 0.9 V depending on the characteristics and structural properties of the specimen.

== Working principle ==
The working principle relies on the ability of certain metals, such as platinum, to readily adsorb carbon monoxide, a process typically considered undesirable as it results in catalyst poisoning by blocking the active sites and causing a loss of activity.

However, the strong affinity of CO to such catalysts also presents an opportunity: since carbon monoxide is a small molecule with a strong affinity to the catalyst, a large enough amount of CO will adsorb to the entire available surface area. That, in turn, means that the catalyst's available surface area can be indirectly measured by evaluating the amount of CO adsorbed. Moreover, insights on the electrode structure can be found.

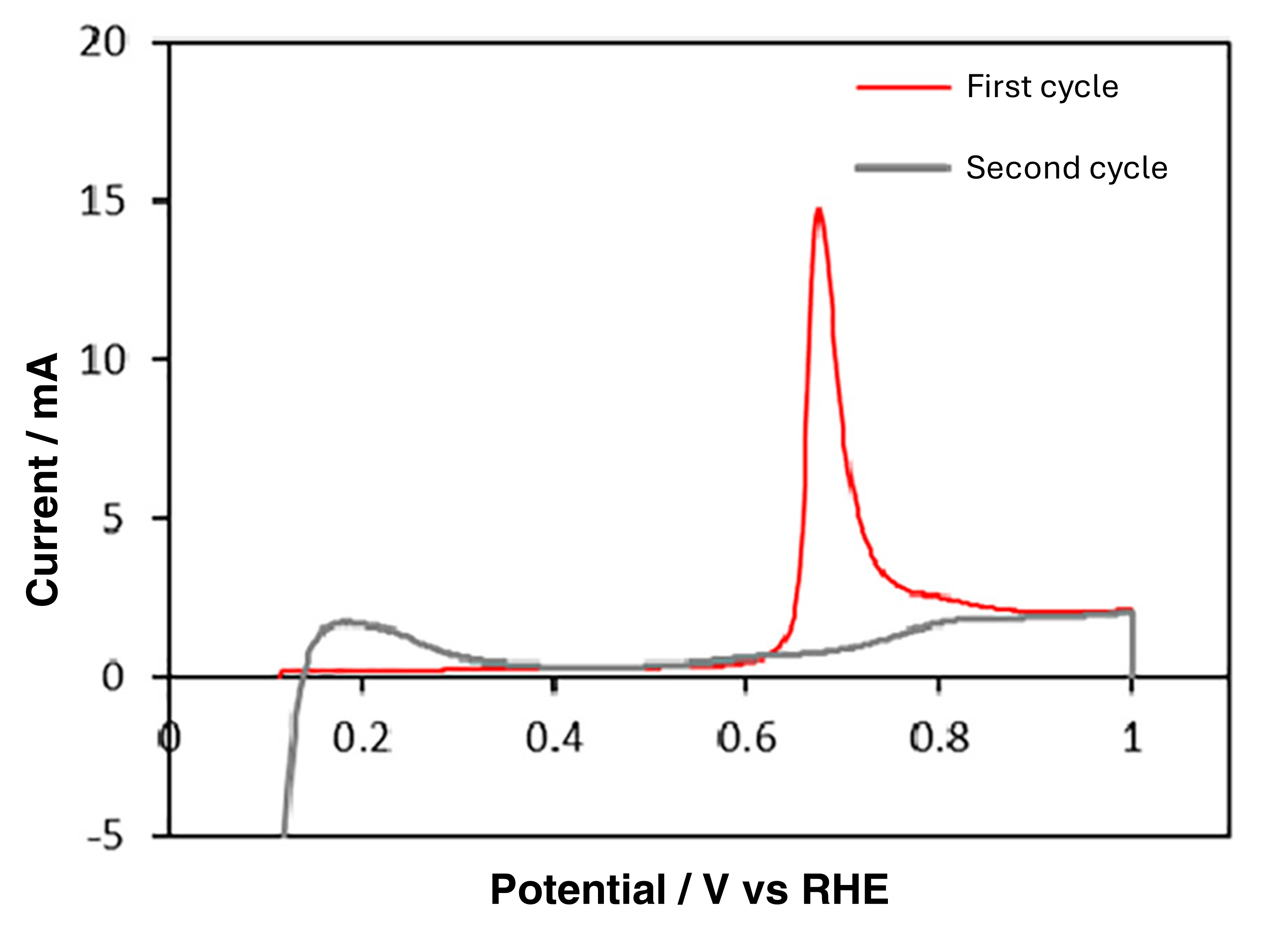
Cyclic voltammogram showing CO peak in a PEM fuel cell.

The evaluation can be done through cyclic voltammetry, which consists in the implementation of an increasing potential to the working electrode, with respect to the reference electrode, at a fixed scan rate and in a range where surface adsorption-limited electron-transfer reactions occur. Several current peaks appear at different potentials and they are indicators of the occurring reactions.

The CO current peak is a result of the charge released during the desorption process of carbon monoxide from the metal catalyst surface, which occurs in the presence of an oxygenated species, according to the overall reaction:

$\ce{M-CO + H2O -> M + CO2 + 2H+ + 2e-}$

A typical CO stripping measurement follows a series of precise steps:

1. Cleaning of the catalyst surface by performing cyclic voltammetry under inert atmosphere.
2. Adsorption of CO at the working electrode by feeding carbon monoxide plus an inert for a few minutes at low potentials.
3. Once all the active sites are poisoned by CO, gaseous remains are purged by flushing the electrode with an inert gas.
4. At least two cycles of cyclic voltammetry must be measured to evaluate the current variation from the CO stripping cycle to the standard cycle.

== Applications ==
=== Active area evaluation ===
The main application of CO stripping is the determination of the electrochemically active surface area ($ECSA$). Compared to hydrogen adsorption/desorption measurements, it was found to be more reliable in the assessment of the active area.

The desorption charge of CO can be calculated on the cyclic voltammogram as the integral of the peak current to which it is associated, after subtracting the contributions of other phenomena such as the double layer current, which can be evaluated from successive scans. Accordingly, the charge is calculated as:

$Q_{CO} = \frac{1}{v}\int_{V_0}^{V_1} (I_{CO,des} - I_{base}) dV$

where:

- $v$ is the potential scan rate.
- $V_0$ is the onset potential at which CO stripping begins.
- $V_1$ is the potential at which the pre-adsorbed carbon monoxide is completely removed.
- $I_{CO,des}$ is the current measured during the first scan, when CO is stripped from the catalyst surface.
- $I_{base}$ is the baseline current which accounts for all the other phenomena occurring and it is measured in the next cycles.

The electrochemically active surface area is then calculated by dividing the obtained charge by the theoretical monolayer adsorption charge on a smooth electrode ($\sigma_{m}$) which, for platinum, is assumed equal to 420 $\mu C/cm^2_{Pt}$:

$ECSA = \frac{Q_{CO}}{\sigma_{m}}$

=== Ionomer-metal interface characterization ===
In electrochemical cells adopting a solid electrolyte, the electrodes contain a thin film of an ion conductive polymer called ionomer which enables ion transport to and from the active sites of the electrocatalyst. However, its presence is also considered responsible for hindered transport of reactants because of localized catalyst poisoning caused by the adsorption of ionic species.

The nature and the quantity of the ions covering the catalyst can be estimated in the early phases of the CO stripping measurement by measuring the displacement charge resulting from the replacement of adsorbed ionic species by CO.

Depending on the species being displaced, cation ($\ce{X^+}$) or anion ($\ce{Y^-}$), it is possible to measure either an oxidative or a reductive current:

$\ce{M-X + CO -> M-CO + X^+ + e^-}$

$\ce{M-Y + CO + e- -> M-CO + Y^-}$

Accordingly, the displacement charge coverage can be calculated as the ratio between the displacement charge and the CO desorption charge. Considering that the overall CO oxidation reaction involves two electrons:

$\Theta_{dis} = \frac{2Q_{dis}}{Q_{CO}}$

where $\Theta_{dis}$ is the ionic species coverage, $Q_{dis}$ is the displacement charge and $Q_{CO}$ is the CO stripping charge.

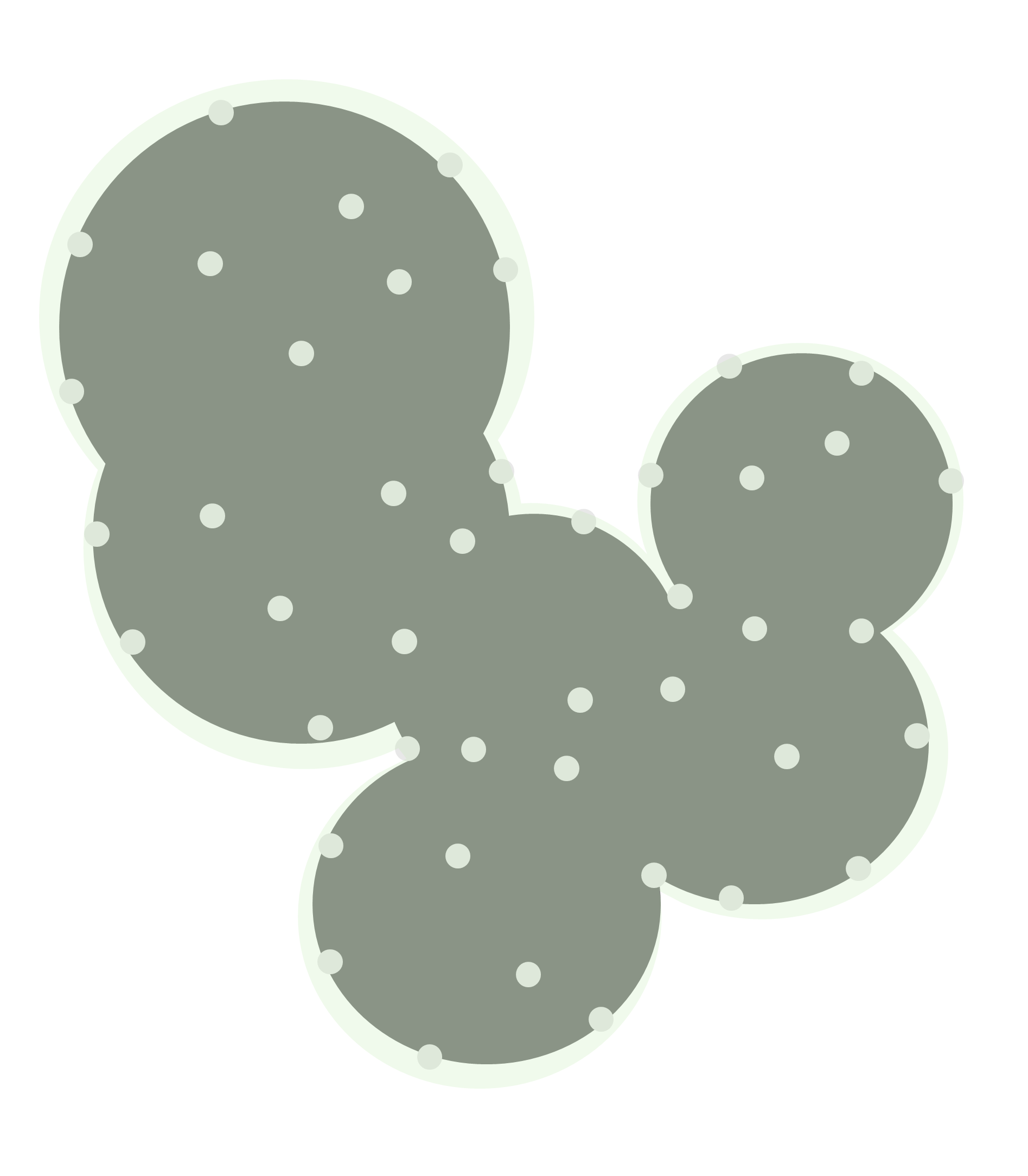
Supported catalyst with ionomer thin film layer.

=== Evaluation of ionomer coverage ===
Besides ionomer-metal interface characterization, CO stripping-based techniques can be used to assess ionomer coverage and distribution on the electrode.

It was found that under reactant-limited conditions, the mass transport resistance, that can be measured by specifically developed techniques, has a linear dependence to the active area of the electrode. In detail, the diffusive resistance of the reactants through the ionomer thin film increases as the measured surface area decreases whereas, molecular and Knudsen diffusion components remain constant.

As a consequence, by controlling the carbon monoxide coverage on the metal catalyst it is possible to derive a correlation between different resistances which are directly influenced by the ionomer's presence and arrangement, obtaining insights on the structure of the electrode.

By measuring the $ECSA$ under conditions in which the active sites that are not covered by the ionomer are blocked (e.g. by filling the electrode with a fluid blocking ionic conduction), hence measuring the active area of the ionomer-covered sites only, the ionomer coverage can be calculated as the ratio between the new value obtained and the one resulting from standard CO stripping.

=== Assessment of catalyst's CO-tolerance ===
Electrochemical cells using hydrogen are particularly subjected to CO poisoning because of the way it is produced. In fact, most of the hydrogen commercially available comes from steam reforming of methane:

$\ce{CH4 + H2O -> CO + 3H2}$

The CO molecule is later oxidized through the water-gas shift reaction and hydrogen is separated from carbon dioxide:

$\ce{CO + H2O -> CO2 + H2}$

However, some impurities may remain in the fuel requiring the use of CO-tolerant catalysts. In this context, CO stripping is used to assess the onset potential at which carbon monoxide begins to be oxidized on the catalyst surface by oxygenated species, a lower onset potential means better CO-tolerance.

== See also ==
- Carbon monoxide
- Catalyst poisoning
- Cyclic voltammetry
- Electrocatalyst
- Electrochemistry
