= Urushibara nickel =

Hydrogenation catalyst

Urushibara nickel is a nickel-based hydrogenation catalyst. It is a heterogeneous catalyst, comparable to Raney nickel. Urushibara nickel is however not pyrophoric. For most hydrogenations, it performs comparably to W-7 grade Raney nickel.

== Preparation ==
Metallic nickel is precipitated by treating a solution of a nickel salt with an excess of zinc. This precipitated nickel contains relatively large amounts of zinc and zinc oxide. Then the catalyst is activated by digesting with either base or acid. There are different designations for differently prepared Urushibara nickel catalysts. The most common is U-Ni-A and U-Ni-B. U-Ni-A is prepared by digesting the precipitated nickel with an acid such as acetic acid. U-Ni-B is prepared by digesting with a base such as sodium hydroxide. After the digestion with acid most of the zinc and zinc oxide is dissolved from the catalyst, while after digestion with base it still contains considerable amounts of zinc and zinc oxide. It is also possible to precipitate the nickel using aluminium or magnesium.

== Variations ==
The cobalt- or iron-based catalysts have also been developed, They are termed Urushibara cobalt and Urushibara iron. As a hydrogenation catalyst, Urushibara cobalt is used for nitrile reduction where it serves as a superior catalyst for the production of primary amines. Urushibara iron is limited as a catalyst due to its relatively low activity toward most functional groups, however; it does finds some use in the partial hydrogenation of alkynes to alkenes.

== History ==
The first of these catalysts were discovered by Yoshiyuki Urushibara in 1951, while doing research on the reduction of estrone to estradiol.

== See also ==
- Nickel boride catalyst
- Nickel(II) oxide
- Cobalt boride
- Lindlar catalyst
- Adams's catalyst
- Molybdenum disulfide
