= Lindlar catalyst =

Catalyst enabling the hydrogenation of alkynes to alkenes

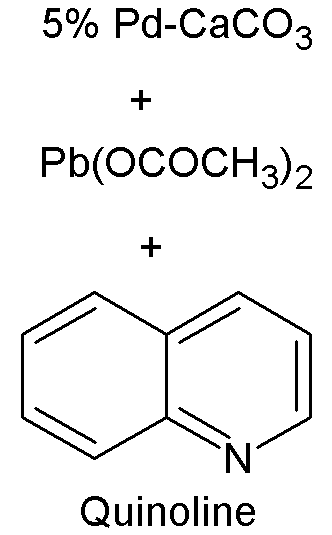

A Lindlar catalyst is a heterogeneous catalyst used for the hydrogenation of alkynes to alkenes without further reduction into alkanes (i.e. chemoselective semihydrogenation). It consists of palladium deposited on calcium carbonate (CaCO_{3}) or barium carbonate (BaCO_{3}), which is then poisoned with various forms of lead. This poisoning serves to deactivate the catalyst, so that that the more reactive alkyne bonds are attacked while the alkenes are spared. It is named after its inventor Herbert Lindlar, who discovered it in 1952.

== Synthesis ==
Lindlar catalyst can be created by reducing palladium chloride in a slurry of calcium carbonate (CaCO_{3}) or barium carbonate (BaCO_{3}) and adding lead(II) acetate. A variety of other catalyst poisons have been used, including lead oxide and quinoline, or other amines. The palladium content of the supported catalyst is usually 5% by weight.

== Catalytic properties ==
The catalyst is used for the hydrogenation of alkynes to alkenes (i.e. without further reduction into alkanes). The lead serves to deactivate the palladium sites, and further deactivation of the catalyst with quinoline or 3,6-dithia-1,8-octanediol enhances its selectivity, preventing formation of alkanes. Thus if a compound contains a double bond as well as a triple bond, only the triple bond is reduced. An example being the reduction of phenylacetylene to styrene.

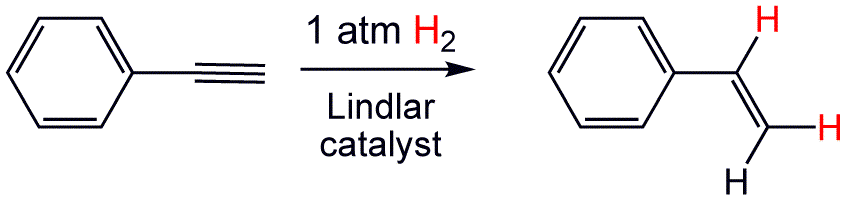

Alkyne hydrogenation is stereospecific, occurring via syn addition to give the cis-alkene. For example the hydrogenation of acetylenedicarboxylic acid using Lindlar catalyst gives maleic acid rather than fumaric acid.

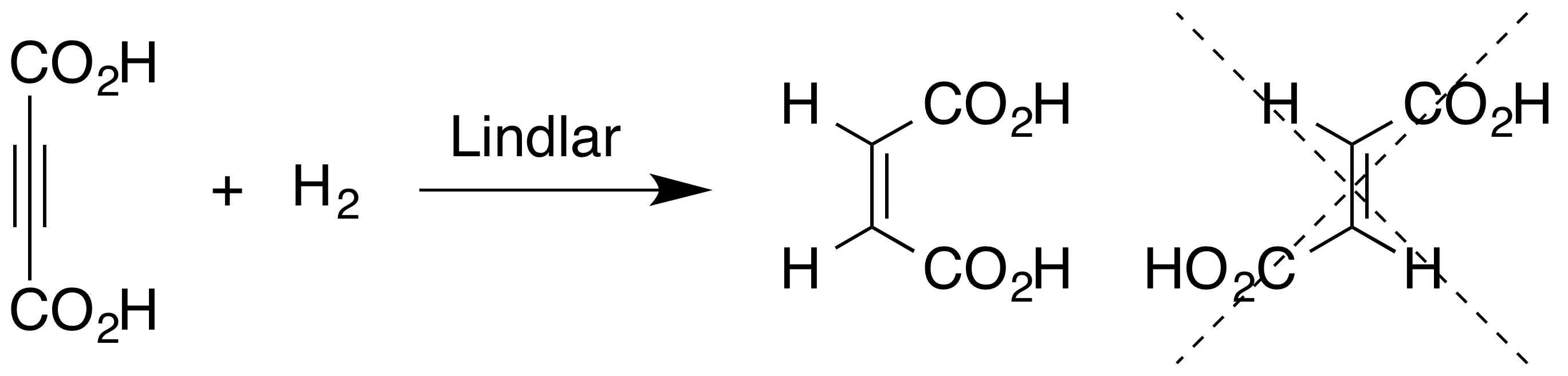

An example of commercial use is the organic synthesis of vitamin A which involves an alkyne reduction with the Lindlar catalyst. These catalysts are also used in the synthesis of dihydrovitamin K1.

== See also ==
- Rosenmund reduction, a reduction using palladium on barium sulfate, poisoned with sulfur compounds.
- Urushibara Nickel, a nickel based catalyst used to hydrogenate alkynes to alkenes.
