= Adams' catalyst =

Names
- IUPAC name Platinum(IV) oxide
- Other names platinum dioxide, platinic oxide

Identifiers
CAS Number	1314-15-4
3D model (JSmol)	Interactive image
ChemSpider	306130
ECHA InfoCard	100.013.840
PubChem CID	345198
UNII	9U12312Y2C
CompTox Dashboard (EPA)	DTXSID40904275
- InChI: InChI=1S/2O.Pt Key: YKIOKAURTKXMSB-UHFFFAOYSA-N; InChI=1/2O.Pt/rO2Pt/c1-3-2 Key: YKIOKAURTKXMSB-FVLSDXBIAR
- SMILES: O=[Pt]=O

Properties
Chemical formula	PtO_{2}
Molar mass	227.08 g/mol
Appearance	black solid
Density	10.2 g/cm^{3}
Melting point	450 °C (842 °F; 723 K)
Solubility in water	insoluble
Solubility	insoluble in alcohol, acid, aqua regia soluble in caustic potash solution
Magnetic susceptibility (χ)	−37.70·10^{−6} cm^{3}/mol

Hazards
- GHS labelling
Pictograms	(GHS03: Oxidizing) (GHS07: Exclamation mark)
Signal word	Danger
Hazard statements	H271, H272, H319
Precautionary statements	P210, P220, P264+P265, P280, P283, P305+P351+P338, P306+P360, P337+P317, P370+P378, P371+P380+P375, P420, P501
- Except where otherwise noted, data are given for materials in their standard state (at 25 °C [77 °F], 100 kPa). verify (what is ?) Infobox references

Adams' catalyst, also known as platinum dioxide, is usually represented as platinum(IV) oxide hydrate, PtO_{2}·xH_{2}O. It is a catalyst for hydrogenation and hydrogenolysis in organic synthesis. This dark brown powder is commercially available. The oxide itself is not an active catalyst, but it becomes active after exposure to hydrogen whereupon it converts to platinum black, which is responsible for reactions.

== Preparation ==
Adams' catalyst is prepared from chloroplatinic acid H_{2}PtCl_{6} or ammonium chloroplatinate, (NH_{4})_{2}PtCl_{6}, by fusion with sodium nitrate. The first published preparation was reported by V. Voorhees and Roger Adams. The procedure involves first preparing a platinum nitrate which is then heated to expel nitrogen oxides.

H_{2}PtCl_{6} + 6 NaNO_{3} → Pt(NO_{3})_{4} + 6 NaCl _{(aq)} + 2 HNO_{3}

Pt(NO_{3})_{4} → PtO_{2} + 4 NO_{2} + O_{2}

The resulting brown cake is washed with water to free it from nitrates. The catalyst can either be used as is or dried and stored in a desiccator for later use. Platinum can be recovered from spent catalyst by conversion to ammonium chloroplatinate using aqua regia followed by ammonia.

== Uses ==
Adams' catalyst is used for many applications. It has shown to be valuable for hydrogenation, hydrogenolysis, dehydrogenation, and oxidation reactions. During the reaction, platinum metal (platinum black) is formed which has been cited to be the active catalyst. Hydrogenation occurs with syn stereochemistry when used on an alkyne resulting in a cis-alkene. Some of the most important transformations include the hydrogenation of ketones to alcohols or ethers (the latter product forming in the presence of alcohols and acids) and the reduction of nitro compounds to amines. However, reductions of alkenes can be performed with Adams' catalyst in the presence of nitro groups without reducing the nitro group. When reducing nitro compounds to amines, platinum catalysts are preferred over palladium catalysts to minimize hydrogenolysis. The catalyst is also used for the hydrogenolysis of phenyl phosphate esters, a reaction that does not occur with palladium catalysts. The pH of the solvent significantly affects the reaction course, and reactions of the catalyst are often enhanced by conducting the reduction in neat acetic acid, or solutions of acetic acid in other solvents.

== Development ==
Before development of Adams' catalyst, organic reductions were carried out using colloidal platinum or platinum black. The colloidal catalysts were more active but posed difficulties in isolating reaction products. This led to more widespread use of platinum black. In Adams' own words:

"...Several of the problems I assigned my students involved catalytic reduction. For this purpose we were using as a catalyst platinum black made by the generally accepted best method known at the time. The students had much trouble with the catalyst they obtained in that frequently it proved to be inactive even though prepared by the same detailed procedure which resulted occasionally in an active product. I therefore initiated a research to find conditions for preparing this catalyst with uniform activity."

== Safety ==
Little precaution is necessary with the oxide but, after exposure to H_{2}, the resulting platinum black can be pyrophoric. Therefore, it should not be allowed to dry and all exposure to oxygen should be minimized.

== See also ==
- Platinum on carbon
- Platinum black
- Rhodium-platinum oxide
- Palladium on carbon
