= Underpotential deposition =

Underpotential deposition (UPD), in electrochemistry, is a phenomenon of electrodeposition of a species (typically reduction of a metal cation to a solid metal) at a potential less negative than the equilibrium (Nernst) potential for the reduction of this metal. The equilibrium potential for the reduction of a metal in this context is the potential at which it will deposit onto itself. Underpotential deposition can then be understood to be when a metal can deposit onto another material more easily than it can deposit onto itself.

== Interpretation ==
The occurrence of underpotential deposition is often interpreted as a result of a strong interaction between the electrodepositing metal M with the substrate S (of which the electrode is built). The M-S interaction needs to be energetically favoured to the M-M interaction in the crystal lattice of the pure metal M. This mechanism is deduced from the observation that UPD typically occurs only up to a monolayer of M (sometimes up to two monolayers). The electrodeposition of a metal on a substrate of the same metal occurs at an equilibrium potential, thus defining the reference point for the underpotential deposition. Underpotential deposition is much sharper on monocrystals than on polycrystalline materials.
