= Rhodium(III) oxide =

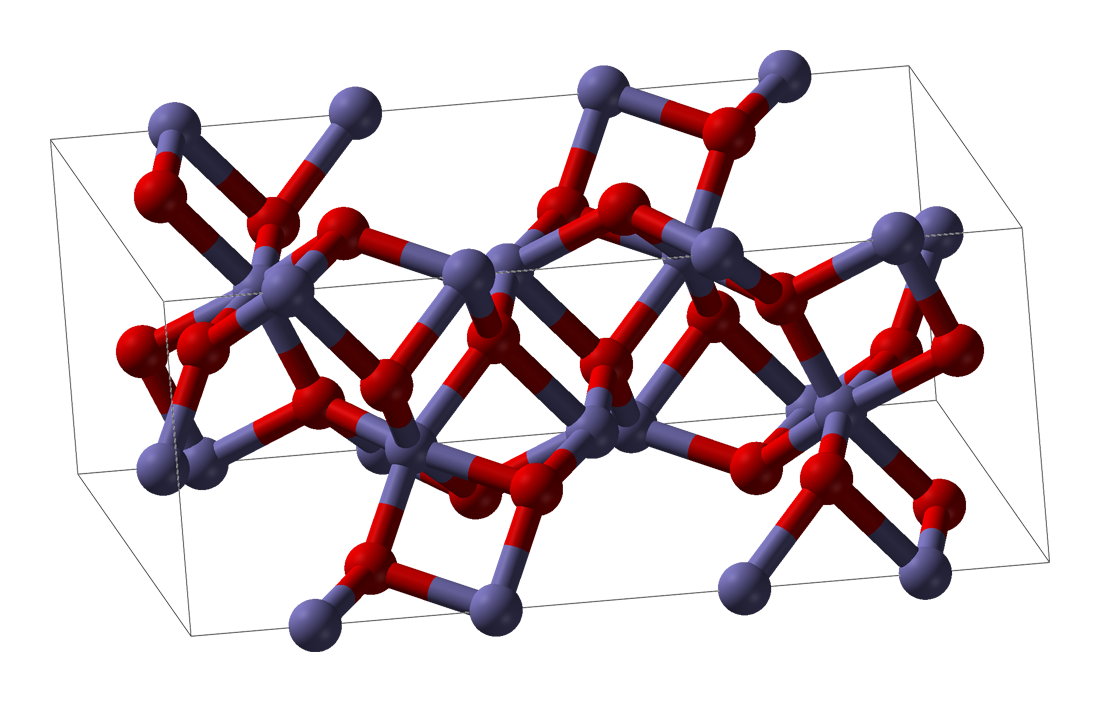
- Rhodium(III) oxide

Names
- Other names Rhodium sesquioxide

Identifiers
| CAS Number | 12036-35-0 |
| 3D model (JSmol) | Interactive image |
| ChemSpider | 140186 |
| ECHA InfoCard | 100.031.666 |
| EC Number | 234-846-9 |
| PubChem CID | 159409 |
| UNII | 6PYI3777JI |
| CompTox Dashboard (EPA) | DTXSID80276468 |
- InChI: InChI=1S/3O.2Rh/q3*-2;2*+3
- SMILES: [O-2].[O-2].[O-2].[Rh+3].[Rh+3]

Properties
| Chemical formula | Rh_{2}O_{3} |
| Molar mass | 253.8092 g/mol |
| Appearance | dark grey odorless powder |
| Density | 8.20 g/cm^{3} |
| Melting point | 1,100 °C (2,010 °F; 1,370 K) (decomposes) |
| Solubility in water | insoluble |
| Solubility | insoluble in aqua regia |
| Magnetic susceptibility (χ) | +104.0·10^{−6} cm^{3}/mol |

Structure
| Crystal structure | hexagonal (corundum) |
| Space group | R3̅c |
| Lattice constant | a = 512.7 pm (hexagonal setting), c = 1385.3 pm (hexagonal setting) |

Hazards
- GHS labelling
| Pictograms | (GHS03: Oxidizing) (GHS07: Exclamation mark) |
| Signal word | Danger |
| Hazard statements | H302+H332, H315, H319, H335 |
| Precautionary statements | P280, P301+P330+P331, P302+P352, P304+P340, P312, P332+P313, P337+P313 |
- Except where otherwise noted, data are given for materials in their standard state (at 25 °C [77 °F], 100 kPa). verify (what is ?) Infobox references

Rhodium(III) oxide is the inorganic compound with the formula Rh_{2}O_{3}. It is a gray solid that is insoluble in ordinary solvents.

== Structure ==
Rh_{2}O_{3} has been found in two major forms. The hexagonal form adopts the corundum structure. It transforms into an orthorhombic structure when heated above 750 °C.

== Production ==
Rhodium oxide can be produced via several routes:

- Treating RhCl_{3} with oxygen at high temperatures.
- Rh metal powder is fused with potassium hydrogen sulfate. Adding sodium hydroxide results in hydrated rhodium oxide, which upon heating converts to Rh_{2}O_{3}.
- Rhodium oxide thin films can be produced by exposing Rh layer to oxygen plasma.
- Nanoparticles can be produced by the hydrothermal synthesis.

== Physical properties ==
Rhodium oxide films behave as a fast two-color electrochromic system: Reversible yellow ↔ dark green or yellow ↔ brown-purple color changes are obtained in KOH solutions by applying voltage ~1 V.

Rhodium oxide films are transparent and conductive, like indium tin oxide (ITO) - the common transparent electrode, but Rh_{2}O_{3} has 0.2 eV lower work function than ITO. Consequently, deposition of rhodium oxide on ITO improves the carrier injection from ITO thereby improving the electrical properties of organic light-emitting diodes.

== Catalytic properties ==
Rhodium oxides are catalysts for hydroformylation of alkenes, N_{2}O production from NO, and the hydrogenation of CO.

== See also ==
- Rhodium
- Rhodium(IV) oxide
- Rhodium-platinum oxide
