= Rhodium(IV) oxide =

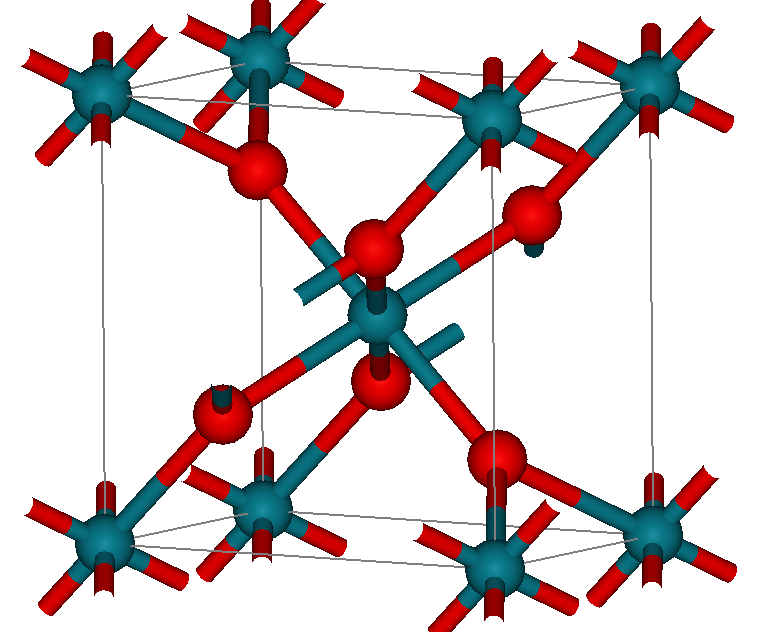
- Rhodium(IV) oxide

Identifiers
CAS Number	12137-27-8
3D model (JSmol)	Interactive image
ChemSpider	15017693
ECHA InfoCard	100.032.021
EC Number	235-237-0
PubChem CID	82936
CompTox Dashboard (EPA)	DTXSID2065254
- InChI: InChI=1S/2O.Rh/q2*-2;+4 Key: ZLDSZHMBHVKLCB-UHFFFAOYSA-N; InChI=1/2O.Rh/q2*-2;+4 Key: ZLDSZHMBHVKLCB-UHFFFAOYAD
- SMILES: [Rh+4].[O-2].[O-2]

Properties
Chemical formula	RhO_{2}
Molar mass	134.904 g/mol
Appearance	black crystalline solid
Density	7.2 g/cm^{3}
Melting point	1,050 °C (1,920 °F; 1,320 K) (decomposes)
Solubility	insoluble in aqua regia

Structure
Crystal structure	tetragonal (rutile)
- Except where otherwise noted, data are given for materials in their standard state (at 25 °C [77 °F], 100 kPa). verify (what is ?) Infobox references

Rhodium(IV) oxide (or rhodium dioxide) is the chemical compound with the formula RhO_{2}.

== Chemical properties ==
RhO_{2} is highly insoluble even in hot aqua regia.

== Structure ==
RhO_{2} has the tetragonal rutile structure.

== Physical properties ==
RhO_{2} has metallic resistivity with values <10^{−4} Ohm·cm. It transforms in air to Rh_{2}O_{3} at 850 °C and then to metal and oxygen at 1050 °C.

== See also ==
- Rhodium
