= Platinum black =

Finely powdered platinum used as a catalyst and for coating Pt electrodes

Platinum black (Pt black) is a fine powder of platinum with good catalytic properties. The name of platinum black is due to its black color. It is used in many ways; as a thin film electrode, a fuel cell membrane catalyst, or as a catalytic ignition of flammable gases for "self-lighting" gas lamps, ovens, and stove burners.

== Uses ==
=== Thin film electrode ===
Platinum black is widely used as a thin film covering solid platinum metal, forming platinum electrodes for applications in electrochemistry. The process of covering platinum electrodes with such a layer of platinum black is called "platinization of platinum". The platinized platinum has a true surface area much higher than the geometrical surface area of the electrode and, therefore, exhibits action superior to that of shiny platinum.

=== Fuel cell membrane catalyst ===
Platinum black powder is used as a catalyst in proton-exchange membrane fuel cells. In common practice, the platinum black is either sprayed using an ultrasonic nozzle or hot-pressed onto the membrane or gas diffusion layer. A suspension of platinum black and carbon powder in ethanol–water solutions serves to optimize the uniformity of the coating, electrical conductivity, and in the case of application to the membrane, to prevent dehydration of the membrane during the application.

=== Catalytic ignition of flammable gases ===
Historically many "self-lighting" gas lamps, ovens, and stove burners used platinum black to catalyze the oxidation of a small amount of gas, lighting the device without a match or spark. This works particularly well for producer gas, town gas, and wood gas which contain a substantial fraction of hydrogen gas (H_{2}), oxidation of which is particularly well catalyzed by platinum black.

== Manufacturing of platinum black powder ==
Platinum black powder can be manufactured from ammonium chloroplatinate by heating at 500 °C in molten sodium nitrate for 30 minutes, followed by pouring the melt into water, boiling, washing, and reduction of the brown powder (believed to be platinum dioxide) with gaseous hydrogen to platinum black.

== Process of platinization of platinum metal ==
Before platinization, the platinum surface is cleaned by immersion in aqua regia (50% solution, i.e., 3 volumes of 12 mol/kg of HCl, 1 volume of 16 mol/kg HNO_{3}, 4 volumes of water).

Platinization is often conducted from water solution of 0.072 mol/kg of chloroplatinic acid and 0.00013 mol/kg of lead acetate, at a current density of 30 mA/cm^{2} for up to 10 minutes. The process evolves chlorine at the anode; the interaction of the chlorine with the cathode is prevented by employing a suitable separation (e.g., a glass frit).

Another author recommends electroplating with the current density of 5 mA/cm^{2} while reversing the polarity every 30 seconds for 15 minutes.

After platinization, the electrode should be rinsed and stored in distilled water. The electrode loses its catalytic properties on prolonged exposure to air.

The process for electroplating platinum black on platinum was invented by Lummer and Kurlbaum when they were unable to reproduce Langley's lampblack-covered platinum foils for bolometers. When the platinum black did not adhere to the cathode, they found that adding around 1% copper sulfate to the chloroplatinic acid in the electrolyte improved the results. Later, they found a much smaller proportion of lead acetate worked better than the copper sulfate.

== Platinum metal sponge ==
Platinum sponge is a porous, grayish-black form of platinum that can adsorb a large amount of gas, such as hydrogen or oxygen gas, allowing it to be used as a catalyst in many gas reactions such as the oxidation of ammonium. It can also be used for the ignition of combustible gases. It is used as the raw material for electronic instrument, chemical industry, and precision alloys. It can also be used as a surface active agent. It is soluble in aqua regia and is formed from a mass of metallic particles.

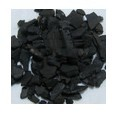
Platinum sponge

Properties of platinum sponge
CAS	7440-6-4
Formula weight	195.08 g/mol
Purity	Pt ≥99.9%
Appearance	Black powder
Melting point	1769 °C
Boiling point	3827 °C
Density	5.78 g/mL
Solubility	Soluble in aqua regia; insoluble in water and inorganic acid

It is made of a mass of platinum particles with the following characteristics:

- Platinum (Pt) content: ≥99.9%
- Iron (Fe) content: ≤0.005%
- Specific surface area: 40–60 m^{2}/g
- Particle size: <10 nm
- Dangerous code: F
- Dangerous level: R11
- Security level: S16
- UN numbers: 3089

It is prepared by dipping asbestos into chloroplatinic acid or ammonium chloroplatinate. The substance is then burned to produce platinum sponge. Alternatively, it can be made by strongly heating ammonium chloroplatinate. Its catalytic properties vary depending on the specifics of the manufacturing.

== Potential of platinized platinum versus shiny platinum ==
In hydrogen saturated hydrochloric acid, the shiny platinum electrode is observed to assume positive potential versus that of platinum black at zero net current (+340 mV at room temperature). With the temperature increasing to 70 °C, the difference in potentials dropped to zero. The reason for this is not perfectly clear, although several explanations have been proposed.

== See also ==
- Standard hydrogen electrode
- Overpotential
- Adams' catalyst (platinum dioxide)
- Raney nickel (catalyst)
