= Chloroplatinic acid =

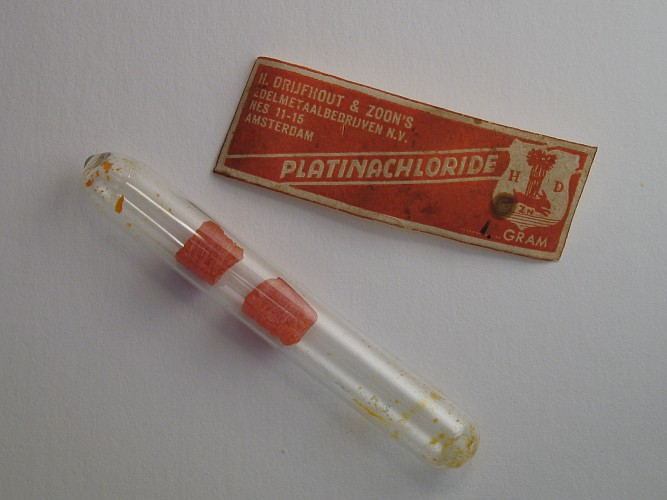

Names
- IUPAC name Dihydronium hexachloroplatinate(2–)
- Other names Hexachloroplatinic acid Hydronium hexachloroplatinate(IV)

Identifiers
CAS Number	16941-12-1
3D model (JSmol)	Interactive image
ChemSpider	55731
ECHA InfoCard	100.037.267
EC Number	241-010-7
PubChem CID	61859
RTECS number	TP1510000
UNII	Q65224GJ7F
UN number	2507
CompTox Dashboard (EPA)	DTXSID30858819
- InChI: InChI=1S/6ClH.Pt/h6*1H;/q;;;;;;+4/p-4 Key: GBFHNZZOZWQQPA-UHFFFAOYSA-J; InChI=1/6ClH.Pt/h6*1H;/q;;;;;;+4/p-4/rCl6Pt/c1-7(2,3,4,5)6/q-2/p+2 Key: GBFHNZZOZWQQPA-DUMOQKOKAQ
- SMILES: Cl[Pt-2](Cl)(Cl)(Cl)(Cl)Cl.[OH3+].[OH3+]

Properties
Chemical formula	H_{2}Cl_{6}Pt
Molar mass	409.81 g/mol
Appearance	Reddish brown solid
Density	2.431 g/cm^{3}
Melting point	60 °C (140 °F; 333 K)
Boiling point	decomposes
Solubility in water	highly soluble

Structure
Crystal structure	anti-fluorite
Coordination geometry	octahedral
Dipole moment	0 D

Hazards
- GHS labelling
Pictograms	(GHS05: Corrosive) (GHS06: Toxic) (GHS07: Exclamation mark) (GHS08: Health hazard)
Signal word	Danger
Hazard statements	H301, H314, H317, H334
Precautionary statements	P260, P264, P270, P272, P280, P285, P301+P310, P301+P330+P331, P302+P352, P303+P361+P353, P304+P340, P304+P341, P305+P351+P338, P310, P321, P330, P333+P313, P342+P311, P363, P405, P501
NFPA 704 (fire diamond)	4 0 2 W
Safety data sheet (SDS)	External MSDS

Related compounds
Other anions	Hexachloropalladic acid; Hexachloroosmic acid
Other cations	Potassium hexachloroplatinate; Ammonium hexachloroplatinate; Rubidium hexachloroplatinate; Caesium hexachloroplatinate
- Except where otherwise noted, data are given for materials in their standard state (at 25 °C [77 °F], 100 kPa). verify (what is ?) Infobox references

Chloroplatinic acid (also known as hexachloroplatinic acid) is an inorganic compound with the formula [H_{3}O]_{2}[PtCl_{6}](H_{2}O)_{x} (0 ≤ x ≤ 6). A red solid, it is an important commercial source of platinum, usually as an aqueous solution. Although often written in shorthand as H_{2}PtCl_{6}, it is the hydronium (H_{3}O^{+}) salt of the hexachloroplatinate anion (PtCl^{2−}_{6}). Hexachloroplatinic acid is highly hygroscopic.

== Production ==
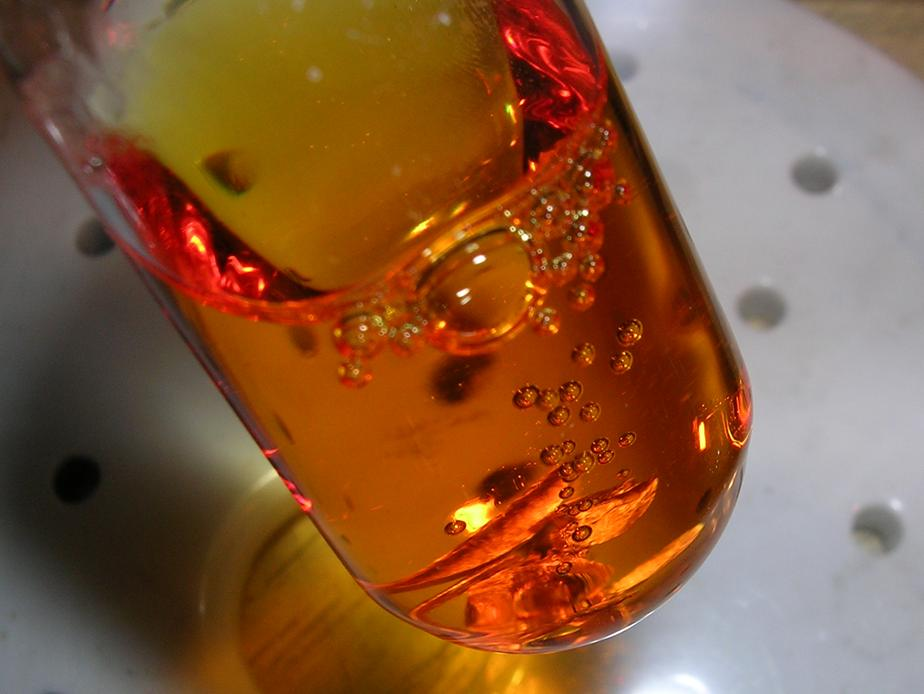
Platinum being dissolved in hot aqua regia

Hexachloroplatinic acid may be produced via a variety of methods. The most common of these methods involves dissolution of platinum in aqua regia. Other methods include exposing an aqueous suspension of platinum particles to chlorine gas, or via electrolysis.

When produced by the aqua regia route, hexachloroplatinic acid is thought to arise by the following equation:

Pt + 4 HNO_{3} + 6 HCl → H_{2}PtCl_{6} + 4 NO_{2} + 4 H_{2}O

The resulting orange/red solution can be evaporated to produce brownish red crystals. Some authors suggest that hexachloroplatinic acid produced using this method is contaminated with nitrosonium hexachloroplatinate. Newer literature indicates that this is not the case, and that once the nitric acid has been driven off, samples prepared via this method contain no detectable nitrogen.

Alternative methods have been investigated and described, often motivated by the avoidance of nitrogen contamination.

== Structure ==
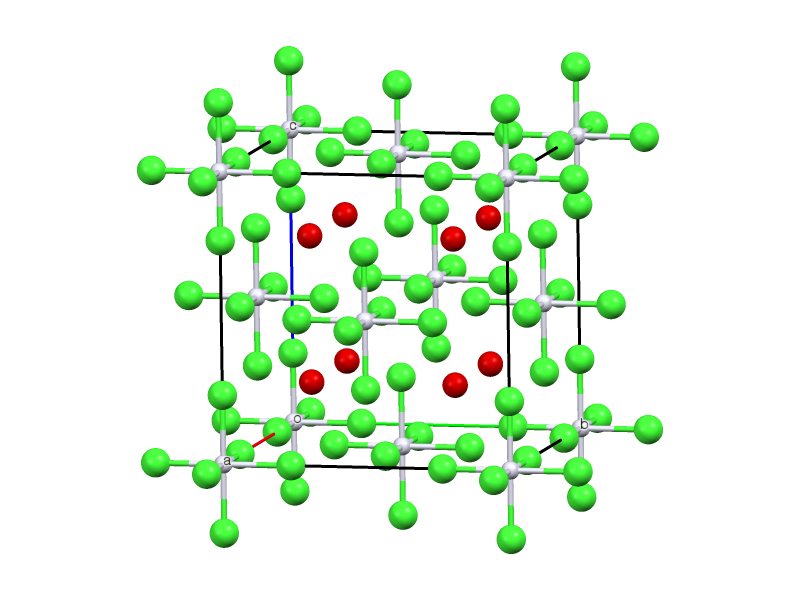
Structure of solid hexachloroplatinic acid. Color code: green = Cl, red = O, gray = Pt. H atoms not shown.

According to X-ray crystallography, hexachloroplatinic acid consists of octahedral PtCl2−
6 ions linked by hydrogen bonding. The cubic array of these octahedra encase water molecules.

== Reactions ==
When heated, hexachloroplatinic acid decomposes to platinum(IV) chloride.

(H_{3}O)_{2}PtCl_{6}·nH_{2}O → PtCl_{4} + 2 HCl + (n + 2) H_{2}O

== Applications ==
=== Potassium determination ===
Chloroplatinic acid was popularized for the quantitative analysis of potassium. The potassium is selectively precipitated from solution as potassium hexachloroplatinate. Determinations were done in 85% (v/v) alcohol solutions with excess platinate ions, and the precipitated product was weighed. Potassium could be detected for solutions as dilute as 0.02 to 0.2% (m/v).

This method for determination of potassium was advantageous compared to the sodium cobaltinitrite method used previously, since it required a single precipitation reaction. Gravimetric analysis of precipitated products has been supplanted by modern instrumental analysis methods such as ion selective electrodes, flame photometry, ICP-AES or ICP-MS.

=== Purification of platinum ===
Upon treatment with an ammonium salt, such as ammonium chloride, chloroplatinic acid converts to ammonium hexachloroplatinate, which precipitates as a solid. Upon heating in an atmosphere of hydrogen, the ammonium salt converts to elemental platinum. Platinum is often isolated from ores or recycled from residues using this method.

=== Catalysis ===
Like many platinum compounds, chloroplatinic acid is a catalyst (or precatalyst) for hydrogenation and related reactions. As first reported by John Speier and colleagues from Dow Corning, it catalyzes the addition of hydrosilanes to olefins, i.e. hydrosilylation. Early demonstration reactions used isopropanol solutions of trichlorosilane (SiHCl_{3}) with pentenes. Prior work on the addition of silanes to alkenes required radical reactions that were inefficient. As well as with Karstedt's catalyst, Speier's catalyst enjoys widespread use for hydrosilylation, the main drawback is the deliquescent properties of the catalyst.

It is generally agreed that chloroplatinic acid is a precursor to the actual catalyst. A possible role for colloidal platinum or zero-valent complexes has also been considered.

== Related compounds ==
Chloroplatinic acid prepared from aqua regia is proposed to contain nitrosonium hexachloroplatinate, (NO)_{2}PtCl_{6}. Nitrosonium hexachloroplatinate is obtained by the reaction of nitrosyl chloride (NOCl) and platinum metal. Nitrosonium hexachloroplatinate has been found to react vigorously with water and hydrochloric acid, making contamination of chloroplatinic acid prepared with aqua regia with nitrosonium hexachloroplatinate unlikely.
