= Ammonium hexachloroplatinate =

- Ammonium hexachloroplatinate

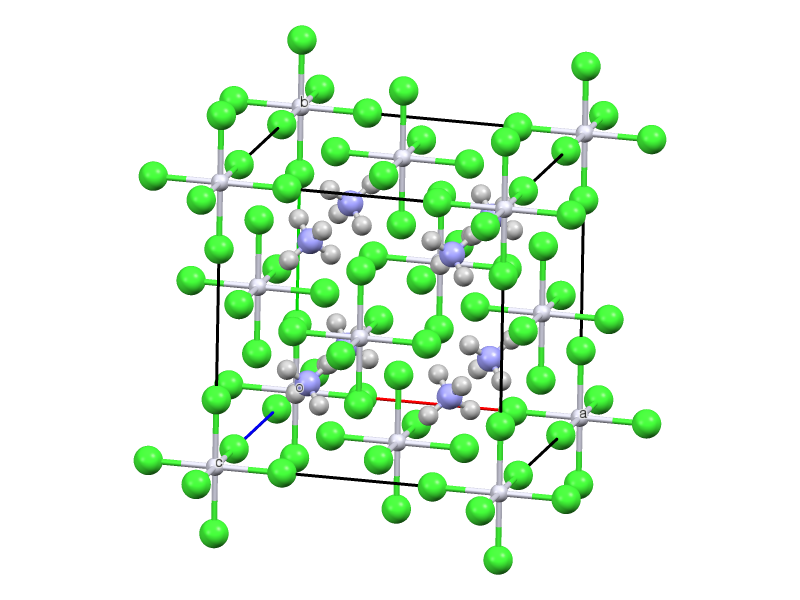
- Ammonium hexachloroplatinate

Names
- IUPAC name Ammonium hexachloroplatinate(IV)
- Other names ammonium chloroplatinate

Identifiers
CAS Number	16919-58-7
3D model (JSmol)	Interactive image
ChEBI	CHEBI:59604
ChemSpider	10628022
ECHA InfoCard	100.037.233
EC Number	240-973-0
PubChem CID	16211460
UNII	1653N9XMIC
CompTox Dashboard (EPA)	DTXSID10893445
- InChI: InChI=1S/6ClH.2H3N.Pt/h6*1H;2*1H3;/q;;;;;;;;+4/p-4 Key: PCCGQTHFYHJATL-UHFFFAOYSA-J; InChI=1/6ClH.2H3N.Pt/h6*1H;2*1H3;/q;;;;;;;;+4/p-4/rCl6Pt.2H3N/c1-7(2,3,4,5)6;;/h;2*1H3/q-2;;/p+2 Key: PCCGQTHFYHJATL-WPAIPAOFAY
- SMILES: [NH4+].[NH4+].Cl[Pt-2](Cl)(Cl)(Cl)(Cl)Cl

Properties
Chemical formula	(NH_{4})_{2}PtCl_{6}
Molar mass	443.87 g/mol
Appearance	yellow solid
Odor	odorless
Density	3.065 g/cm^{3}
Melting point	380 °C (716 °F; 653 K) decomposes
Solubility in water	0.289 g/100ml (0 °C); 0.7 g/100ml (15 °C); 0.499 g/100ml (20 °C); 3.36 g/100ml (100 °C)

Hazards
- GHS labelling
Pictograms	(GHS05: Corrosive) (GHS06: Toxic) (GHS08: Health hazard)
Signal word	Danger
Hazard statements	H301, H317, H318, H334
Precautionary statements	P233, P260, P264, P264+P265, P270, P271, P272, P280, P284, P301+P316, P302+P352, P304+P340, P305+P354+P338, P317, P321, P330, P333+P317, P342+P316, P362+P364, P403, P405, P501
Threshold limit value (TLV)	0.002 mg/m^{3}, as Pt
- Lethal dose or concentration (LD, LC)
LD_{50} (median dose)	195 mg/kg rat
- NIOSH (US health exposure limits)
PEL (Permissible)	0.002 mg/m^{3}, as Pt

Related compounds
Other cations	Potassium hexachloroplatinate
- Except where otherwise noted, data are given for materials in their standard state (at 25 °C [77 °F], 100 kPa). verify (what is ?) Infobox references

Ammonium hexachloroplatinate, also known as ammonium chloroplatinate, is the inorganic compound with the formula (NH_{4})_{2}[PtCl_{6}]. It is a rare example of a soluble platinum(IV) salt that is not hygroscopic. It forms intensely yellow solutions in water. In the presence of 1M NH_{4}Cl, its solubility is only 0.0028 g/100 mL.

== Preparation and structure ==
The compound consists of separate tetrahedral ammonium cations and octahedral [PtCl_{6}]^{2−} anions. It is usually generated as a fine yellow precipitate by treating a solution of hexachloroplatinic acid with a solution of an ammonium salt. The complex is so poorly soluble that this step is employed in the isolation of platinum from ores and recycled residues.

As analyzed by X-ray crystallography, the salt crystallizes in a cubic motif reminiscent of the fluorite structure. The [PtCl_{6}]^{2−} centers are octahedral. The NH_{4}^{+} centers are hydrogen bonded to the chloride ligands.

== Uses and reactions ==
Ammonium hexachloroplatinate is used in platinum plating. Heating (NH_{4})_{2}[PtCl_{6}] under a stream of hydrogen at 200 °C produces platinum sponge. Treating this with chlorine gives H_{2}[PtCl_{6}].

Ammonium hexachloroplatinate decomposes to yield platinum sponge when heated to high temperatures:

3(NH_{4})_{2}PtCl_{6} → 3Pt(s) + 2NH_{4}Cl(g) + 16HCl(g) + 2N_{2}(g)

== Safety ==
Dust containing ammonium hexachloroplatinate can be highly allergenic. "Symptoms range from irritation of skin and mucous membranes to life-threatening attacks of asthma."
