= Organoplatinum chemistry =

Organoplatinum chemistry is the chemistry of organometallic compounds containing a carbon to platinum chemical bond, and the study of platinum as a catalyst in organic reactions. Organoplatinum compounds exist in oxidation state 0 to IV, with oxidation state II most abundant. The general order in bond strength is Pt-C (sp) > Pt-O > Pt-N > Pt-C (sp^{3}). Organoplatinum and organopalladium chemistry are similar, but organoplatinum compounds are more stable and therefore less useful as catalysts.

== Organoplatinum(0) ==
Most organoplatinum(0) compounds contain alkene and alkyne ligands. Carbonyl complexes are rare, and the analogue of Ni(CO)_{4} is elusive. The alkene and alkyne ligands serve as two-electron donors, for example in the complexes (PPh_{3})_{2}Pt(C_{2}H_{4}) and (PPh_{3})_{2}Pt(C_{2}Ph_{2}). The ethylene ligand in (PPh_{3})_{2}Pt(C_{2}H_{4}) is labile and exchanges with alkynes and electrophilic alkenes, even C_{60} a fullerene.

A general synthetic route to (PPh_{3})_{2}Pt(un) (un = alkene, alkyne) is reduction of potassium tetrachloroplatinate with ethanolic potassium hydroxide or hydrazine in presence of a phosphine ligand such as triphenylphosphine and the alkene or alkyne. Such reactions proceed via the intermediacy of cis-dichlorobis(triphenylphosphine)platinum(II). Nitrogen-based ligands do not often support the formation of platinum complexes of alkenes and alkynes.

Zerovalent organoplatinum complexes lacking phosphine ligands are often prepared via PtCl_{2}(COD).

Li_{2}C_{8}H_{8} + PtCl_{2}(COD) + 3 C_{7}H_{10} → [Pt(C_{7}H_{10})_{3}] + 2 LiCl + C_{8}H_{8} + C_{8}H_{12}
Pt(C_{7}H_{10})_{3} + 2 COD → Pt(COD)_{2} + 3 C_{7}H_{10}

where C_{7}H_{10} is norbornene.

== Organoplatinum(I) ==
Platinum(I) compounds are uncommon but generally are diamagnetic because they have Pt-Pt bonds. An example is the dication [Pt_{2}(CO)_{6}]^{2+}.

== Organoplatinum(II) ==
A historically significant organoplatinum(II) compound is Zeise's salt, which is obtained from ethylene and potassium tetrachloroplatinate:

The colourless diolefin complex dichloro(cycloocta-1,5-diene)platinum(II) is a more modern relative, and is more widely used.

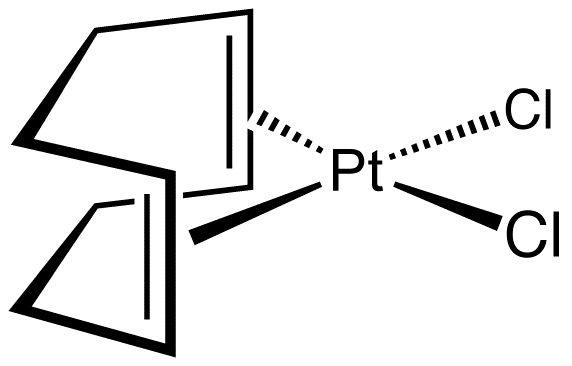

The stability and diversity of platinum(II) alkene complexes contrasts with the rarity of alkene complexes of nickel(II). Platinum allyl complexes are also common. In contrast to nickel chemistry, where compounds such as CpNi(L)X are common, cyclopentadienyl derivatives of Pt(II) are rare, consistent with the reluctance of Pt(II) to become pentacoordinate.

Alkyl and aryl platinum(II) complexes are often prepared by oxidative addition of an alkyl halide or aryl halide to a Pt(0) precursor such as tetrakis(triphenylphosphine)platinum(0) or Pt(C_{2}H_{4})(PPh_{3})_{2}. Alternatively, platinum(II) chlorides are susceptible to alkylation:

PtCl_{2}(SMe_{2})_{2} + 2 MeLi → PtMe_{2}(SMe_{2})_{2} + 2 LiCl

The dimethylsulfide ligands in PtMe_{2}(SMe_{2})_{2} can be displaced by other ligands.

Many organoplatinum(II) complexes arise via ortho-metalation and related intramolecular C-H activation processes.

Platinum forms certain mono-cyclopentadienide complexes, but platinocene is unstable.

== Organoplatinum(IV) ==
The first organoplatinum compound ever synthesised was trimethylplatinum iodide from platinum(IV) chloride and methylmagnesium iodide, reported by Pope and Peachey in 1907. The compound adopts a cubane-like structure with four triply bridging iodide ligands. "Tetramethylplatinum" was claimed in 1952 by Henry Gilman as a derivative of this tetramer, but this claim was later shown to be incorrect ("Tetramethylplatinum" proved to be [PtMe_{3}OH]_{4}). Salts of [PtMe_{6}]^{2−} and [PtMe_{4}]^{2−} have been characterized.

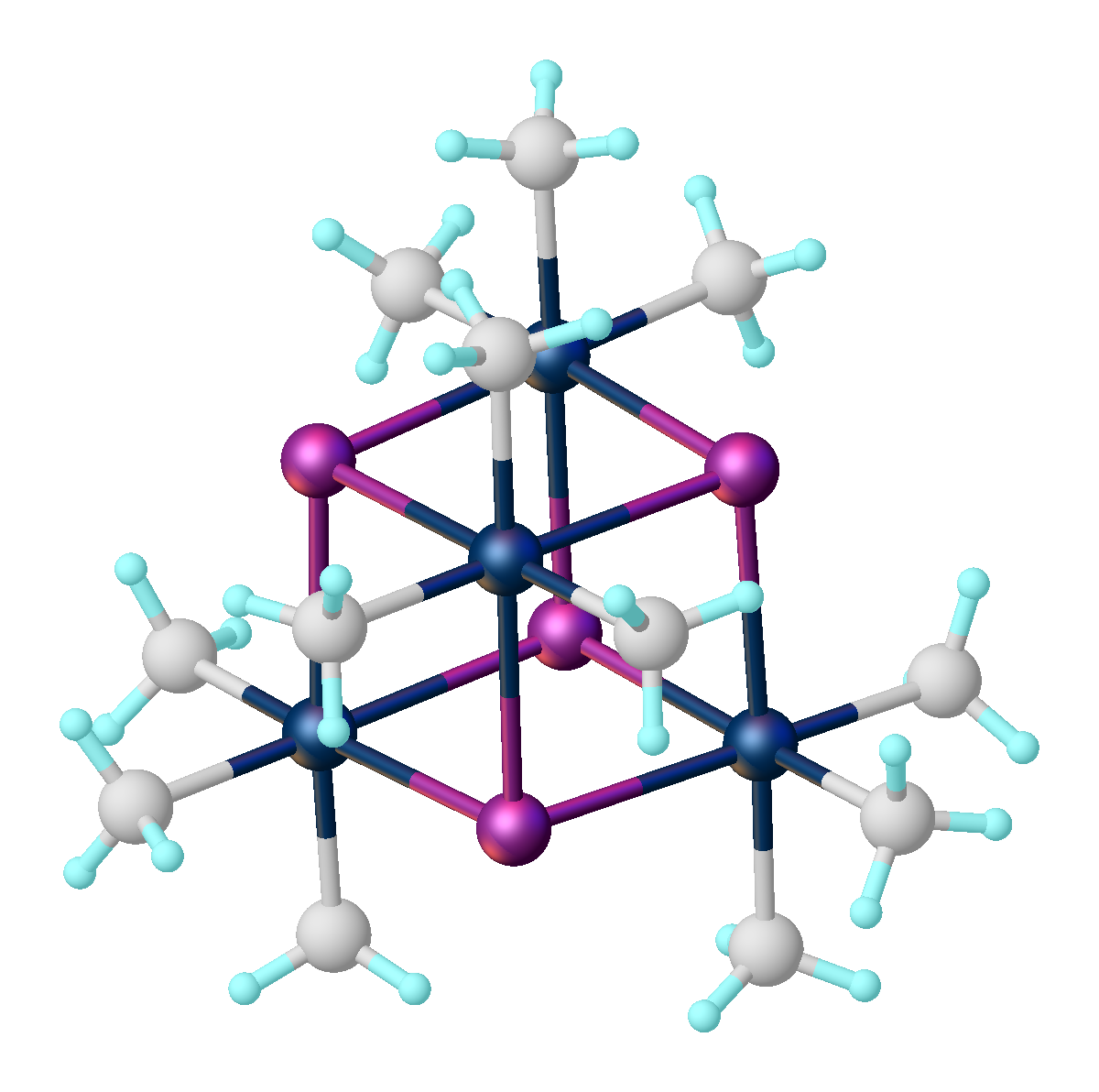
Structure of [Me_{3}PtI]_{4}.

Organoplatinum(IV) hydrides are rare. The first isolated representatives were prepared from organotin halides or acids with orthometalated arylplatinum(II) compounds. The compound Me(PEt_{3})_{2}PtOTf reacts reversibly with triflic acid between -60 and -80 °C, forming methane and (PEt_{3})_{2}Pt(OTf)_{2} at -20 °C. Weak acids often suffice even water and alcohol and in C-H bond activation the proton source is an alkane.

== Catalysis ==
Heterogeneous catalysts based on platinum play a major role in the petrochemical industry, and it is assumed that these useful reactions proceed via surface-bound organoplatinum intermediates. Better defined but less commercially significant are homogeneous catalysts based on platinum.

For hydrosilylation, H_{2}PtCl_{6} ("Speier's catalyst") is an important catalyst. Mechanisms for this catalytic system usually assume intermediates that contain hydride, silyl ligand (R_{3}Si), and alkene ligands. Cis-dichlorobis(diethyl sulfide)platinum(II) and Karstedt's catalyst (adduct of divinyltetramethyldisiloxane and chloroplatinic acid) also catalyse hydrosilylation. Many metallodendrimers have repeating units based on organoplatinum compounds.

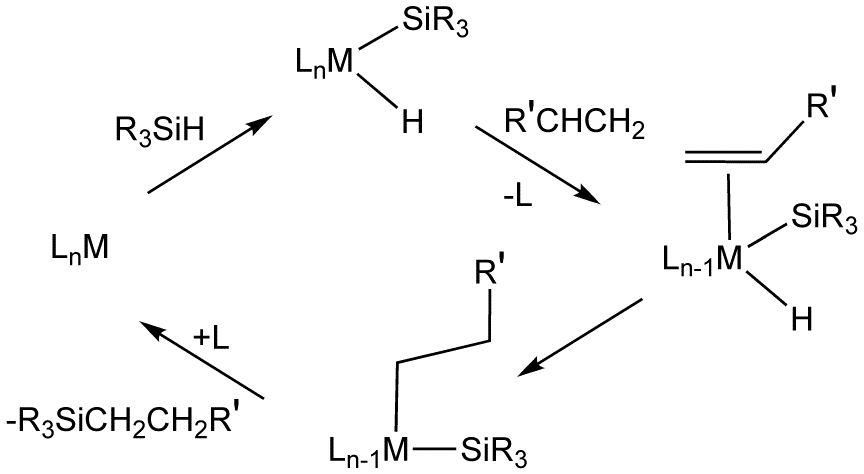
Idealized mechanism for metal-catalysed hydrosilylation of an alkene.

=== Research themes ===
Organoplatinum compounds are implicated in the Shilov system for the conversion of methane into methyl chloride. Strenuous efforts have been made, thus far unsuccessfully, to extend this reactivity to practical methods for functionalizing methane. For example, platinum complexes of bipyrimidine catalyze the conversion of methane, oxygen, and sulfur trioxide into methyl bisulfate.
