= Karstedt =

Karstedt, von Karstedt is a German surname, its English language version may be Karshtedt, from Russian: Карштедт.

- Susanne Karstedt
- Bruce D. Karstedt, creator of Karstedt's catalyst
- Elizabeth von Karstedt, first wife of Walther von Brauchitsch
