= Trimethylplatinum iodide =

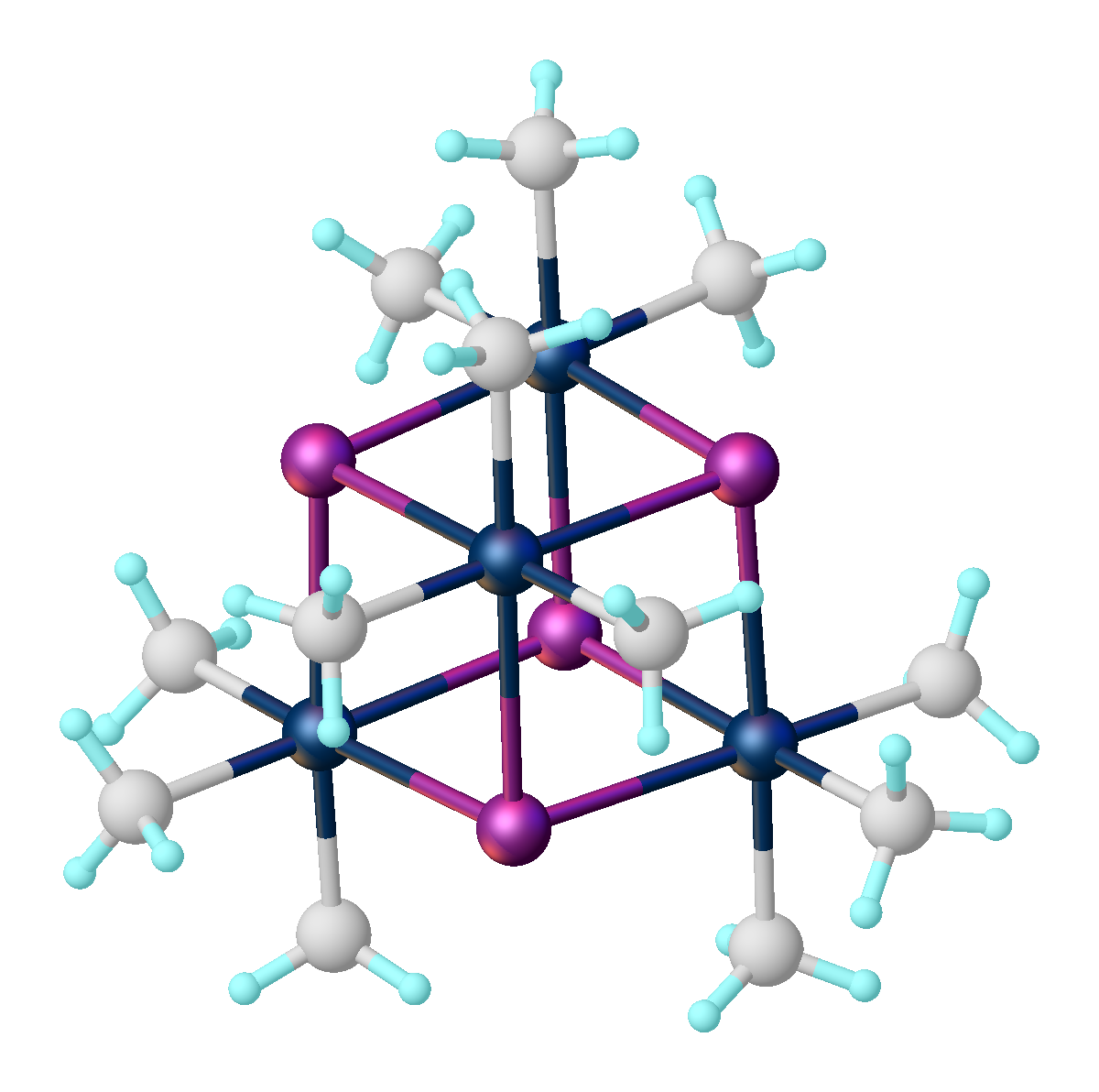

Names
- Other names Iodotrimethylplatinum(IV)

Identifiers
CAS Number	14364-93-3
3D model (JSmol)	Interactive image
ChemSpider	11522740
ECHA InfoCard	100.206.221
EC Number	681-046-4
PubChem CID	11824720
CompTox Dashboard (EPA)	DTXSID30473900
- InChI: InChI=1S/3CH3.HI.Pt/h3*1H3;1H;/q3*-1;;+1/p-1 Key: ZCSQPOLLUOLHHF-UHFFFAOYSA-M
- SMILES: [CH3-].[CH3-].[CH3-].I[Pt]

Properties
Chemical formula	C_{12}H_{36}I_{4}Pt_{4}
Molar mass	1468.374 g·mol^{−1}
Appearance	white solid
Melting point	190-195 °C

Hazards
- GHS labelling
Pictograms	(GHS02: Flammable) (GHS07: Exclamation mark)
Signal word	Warning
Hazard statements	H228, H302, H312, H315, H319, H332, H413
Precautionary statements	P210, P240, P241, P261, P264, P270, P271, P273, P280, P301+P312, P302+P352, P304+P312, P304+P340, P305+P351+P338, P312, P321, P322, P330, P332+P313, P337+P313, P362, P363, P370+P378, P501
- Except where otherwise noted, data are given for materials in their standard state (at 25 °C [77 °F], 100 kPa). Infobox references

Trimethylplatinum iodide is the organoplatinum complex with the formula [(CH_{3})_{3}PtI]_{4}. It is a white, air-stable solid that was one of the first σ-alkyl metal complexes reported. It arises from the reaction of potassium hexachloroplatinate with methylmagnesium iodide. The complex exists as a tetramer: a cubane-type cluster with four octahedral Pt(IV) centers linked by four iodides as triply bridging ligands. Due to its stability, it is often utilized as a precursor en route to the synthesis of other organoplatinum compound, such as hydrosilylation catalysts. It is also used as a precursor for forming platinum layers for electronics.

== Synthesis ==
Pope and Peachey treated chloroplatinic acid with excess methylmagnesium iodide. The trimethylated Pt(IV) complex could be isolated as a yellow crystalline solid, which contained iodine impurities. Improvements on the synthesis in later years utilized the more facile hexachloroplatinate reagent, potassium hexachloroplatinate, and the addition of iodomethane to reduce the amount of methylmagnesium that needed to use, which generated more byproducts.

Trimethylplatinum iodide could also be formed from ion exchange using potassium iodide, starting from other trimethylplatinum(IV) complexes such as (CH_{3})_{3}Pt(NO_{3}) or (CH_{3})_{3}Pt(SO_{4}).

== Structure ==
=== Crystallography ===
The compound exists as a tetramer, crystallizing in a monoclinic unit cell. Each Pt atom is coordinated in pseudo-octahedral geometry, while the tetramer unit is nearly cubic in the Pt-I core. The average Pt-I bond distance is 2.83 Å, while the average Pt-C bond distance is 2.04 Å. The fluoride, bromide, chloride, and pseudohalide (OH, N_{3}, SCN, SMe) analogues [(CH_{3})_{3}PtX)]_{4} also exist as tetramers, all forming cubane clusters.

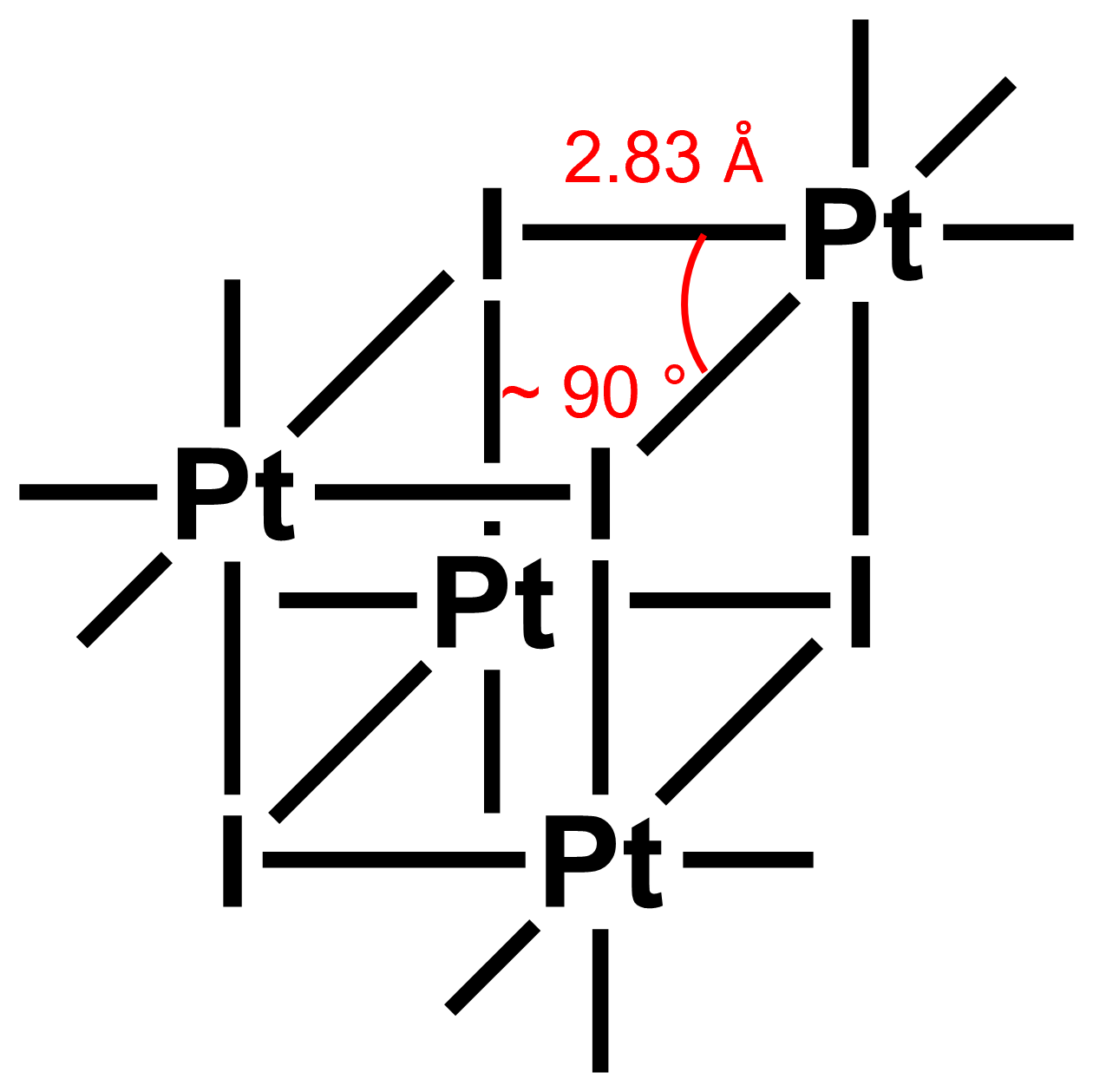
Pt-I bond distance and I-Pt-I bond angles of the cubic tetramer, [(CH_{3})_{3}PtI]_{4}.

=== Electronic ===
The tetramer absorbs in weakly at 436 nm and strongly in the UV (209 nm) region and exhibits a very weak emission of 735 nm at room temperature in the solid state or in glasses of toluene. On the basis of octahedral symmetry, the lower energy absorption is suggested to be a spin-forbidden d-d transition, while the higher energy absorption is proposed to be a ligand-to-metal charge transfer band due to high oxidation state on the Pt. The emission is suggested to be phosphorescence, with metal-metal interactions leading to a large Stokes shift.

Infrared and Raman spectroscopy have also been used to indicate the tetramer structure with cubic breathing modes at very low energies of < 250 cm^{−1}.

== Reactivity ==
The tetramer decomposes, sometime explosively, when heated below at 175 - 200 °C, resulting in platinum metal, ethane, and iodomethane. When exposed to UV light in solution, the tetramer can undergo photolysis of two methyl radicals by reductive elimination, forming the brief Pt(II)(CH_{3})I species. This reactivity is attributed to the ligand-to-metal charge transfer excitation.

The cubane structure can undergo decomposition by ligand substitution and breaking of the bridging iodine, to form a variety of octahedral organoplatinum complexes. Derived compounds include those with polypyridine, pincer, acetylacetonate, and trispyrazolylborate ligands.

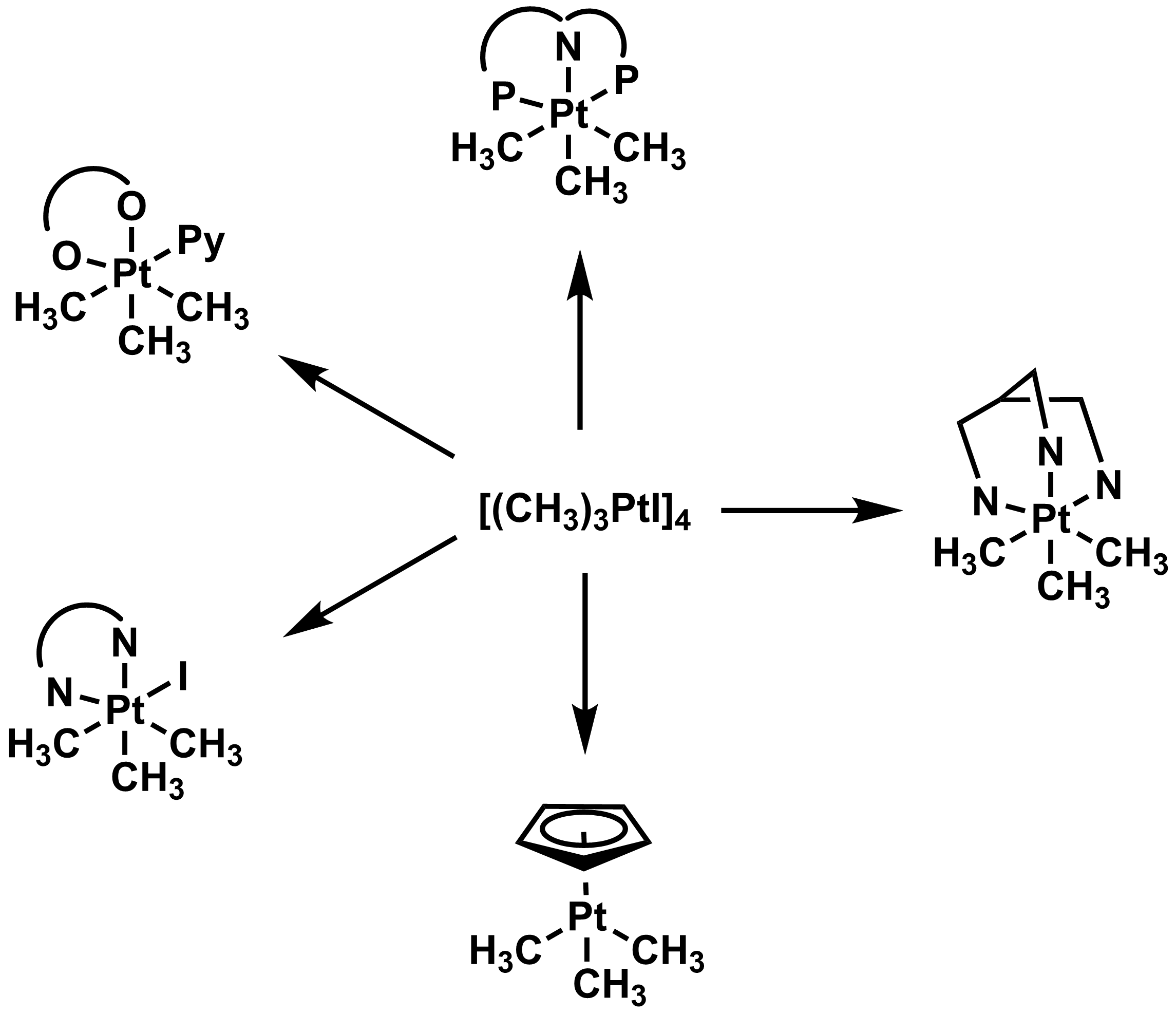
Various octahedral organoplatinum complexes that can be synthesized from trimethylplatinum iodide.

== Applications ==
Trimethylplatinum iodide has been utilized as a precursor to volatile Pt complexes for possible use in chemical vapor deposition or atomic layer deposition. One such derivative is (CH_{3}C_{5}H_{4})Pt(CH_{3})_{3}, which sublimes near room temperature:

[Pt(CH_{3})_{3}I]_{4} + 4 Na(CH_{3}C_{5}H_{4} → 4(CH_{3}C_{5}H_{4})Pt(CH_{3})_{3} + 4NaI

Like other platinum complexes, the trimethylplatinum iodide complex catalyzes hydrosilylation of alkenes. Catalysis requires heating to decompose the tetramer.

== See also ==
- Transition metal alkyl complexes
