= 1,1,3,3-Tetramethyl-1,3-divinyldisiloxane =

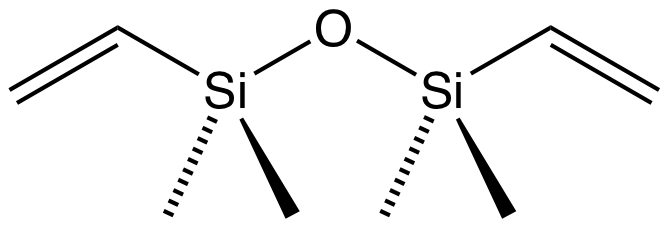

Names
- Preferred IUPAC name 1,3-Diethenyl-1,1,3,3-tetramethyldisiloxane

Identifiers
CAS Number	2627-95-4
3D model (JSmol)	Interactive image
ChEMBL	ChEMBL1878672
ChemSpider	68328
ECHA InfoCard	100.018.273
EC Number	220-099-6
PubChem CID	75819
UNII	SJ4D71ZQF4
CompTox Dashboard (EPA)	DTXSID7038810
- InChI: InChI=1S/C8H18OSi2/c1-7-10(3,4)9-11(5,6)8-2/h7-8H,1-2H2,3-6H3 Key: BITPLIXHRASDQB-UHFFFAOYSA-N
- SMILES: C[Si](C)(C=C)O[Si](C)(C)C=C

Properties
Chemical formula	C_{8}H_{18}OSi_{2}
Molar mass	186.401 g·mol^{−1}
Appearance	colorless liquid
Density	0.811 g/cm^{3}
Melting point	−99.7 °C (−147.5 °F; 173.5 K)
Boiling point	139 °C (282 °F; 412 K)

Hazards
- GHS labelling
Pictograms	(GHS05: Corrosive) (GHS07: Exclamation mark)
Signal word	Danger
Hazard statements	H225, H226, H315, H319, H335, H413
Precautionary statements	P210, P233, P240, P241, P242, P243, P261, P264, P271, P273, P280, P302+P352, P303+P361+P353, P304+P340, P305+P351+P338, P312, P321, P332+P313, P337+P313, P362, P370+P378, P403+P233, P403+P235, P405, P501
- Except where otherwise noted, data are given for materials in their standard state (at 25 °C [77 °F], 100 kPa). Infobox references

1,1,3,3-Tetramethyl-1,3-divinyldisiloxane (also referred to as tetramethyldivinyldisiloxane) is the organosilicon compound with the formula O(SiMe_{2}CH=CH_{2})_{2}.

Tetramethyldivinyldisiloxane is a colorless liquid that is employed as a ligand in organometallic chemistry and also as a homogeneous catalyst. The ligand is a component of Karstedt's catalyst. It was first prepared by hydrolysis of vinyldimethylmethoxysilane, (CH_{2}=CH)Me_{2}SiOMe.
