= Zeise's salt =

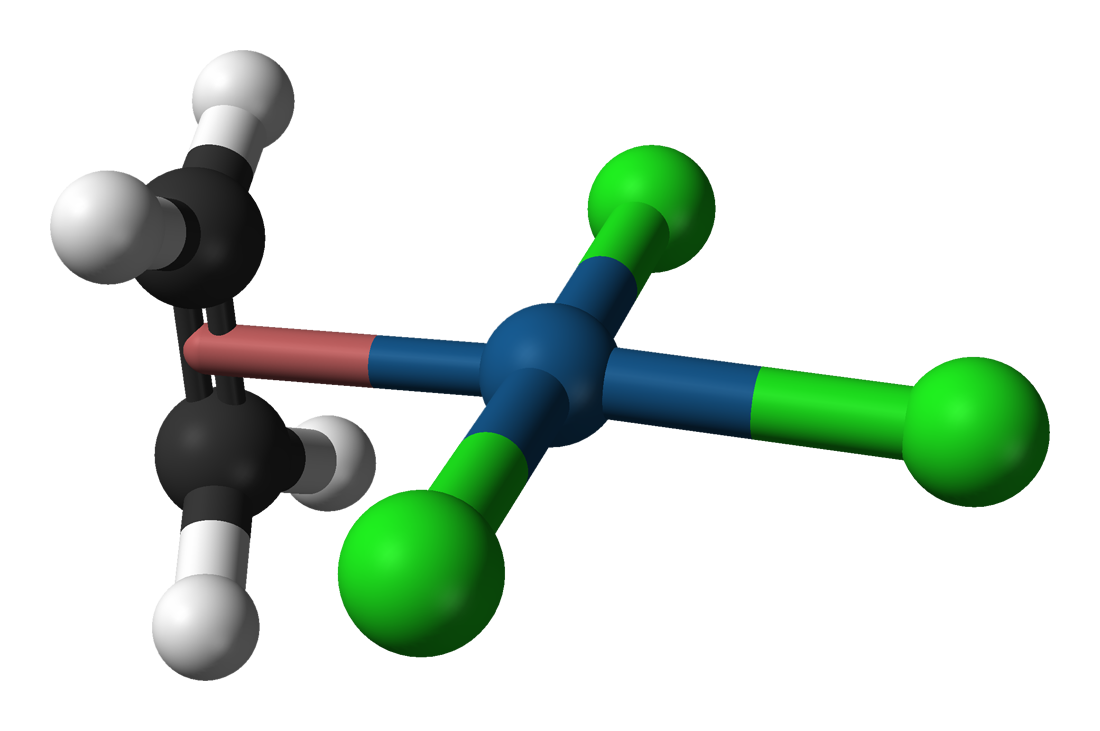

Names
- IUPAC name Potassium trichloro(ethene)platinate(II) hydrate

Identifiers
CAS Number	16405-35-9
3D model (JSmol)	Interactive image
ChemSpider	21241825
ECHA InfoCard	100.158.770
EC Number	630-445-1
PubChem CID	193510
CompTox Dashboard (EPA)	DTXSID90936900
- InChI: InChI=1S/C2H4.3ClH.K.H2O.Pt/c1-2;;;;;;/h1-2H2;3*1H;;1H2;/q;;;;+1;;+2/p-3 Key: DCEGWIMEFFONKJ-UHFFFAOYSA-K
- SMILES: [K+].C=C.Cl[Pt-](Cl)Cl.O

Properties
Chemical formula	C_{2}H_{6}Cl_{3}KOPt
Molar mass	386.60 g·mol^{−1}
Appearance	Yellow crystals
Melting point	220 °C

Hazards
- GHS labelling
Pictograms	(GHS07: Exclamation mark)
Signal word	Warning
Hazard statements	H315, H319, H335
- Except where otherwise noted, data are given for materials in their standard state (at 25 °C [77 °F], 100 kPa). verify (what is ?) Infobox references

Zeise's salt, potassium trichloro(ethylene)platinate(II) hydrate, is the chemical compound with the formula K[PtCl_{3}(C_{2}H_{4})]·H_{2}O. The anion of this air-stable, yellow, coordination complex contains a ethene as a ligand bound to the Pt. The salt is of historical importance in the area of organometallic chemistry as one of the first examples of a transition metal alkene complex and is named for its discoverer, William Christopher Zeise.

== Preparation ==
This compound was originally prepared by Zeise by heating mixtures of platinum chlorides and potassium chloride in ethanol. Under suitable conditions, the ethanol converts to sufficient ethylene to allow the formation of the salt. The hydrate can be more readily prepared by treating a solution of K_{2}[PtCl_{4}] and ethylene with a catalytic amount of SnCl_{2}. The water of hydration can be removed in vacuo. Zeise's salt is commercially available as a hydrate.

== Structure ==
The anion is the component of this salt that is of interest. In the anion Pt is bound to (or "coordinated to") four ligands: three chlorides (Cl^{-}) and ethylene (C_{2}H_{4}). The PtCl_{3} group is nearly planar and bisects the C=C bond of the ethylene ligand, which is oriented in a perpendicular manner. Both carbons of the ethylene are bonded to Pt, an interaction described as η^{2}. The Pt-Cl bond trans to ethylene is 234 pm in length, while the other two Pt-Cl bonds are near 230 pm. In Zeise's salt and related compounds, the alkene rotates about the metal-alkene bond with a modest activation energy. Analysis of the barrier heights indicates that the π-bonding between most metals and the alkene is weaker than the σ-bonding.

== History ==
Zeise's salt was one of the first organometallic compounds to be reported. It was discovered by William Christopher Zeise, a professor at the University of Copenhagen, who prepared this compound in 1830 while investigating the reaction of PtCl_{4} with boiling ethanol. Following careful analysis he proposed that the resulting compound contained ethylene. Justus von Liebig, a highly influential chemist of that era, often criticised Zeise's proposal, but Zeise's proposal was decisively supported in 1868 when Birnbaum prepared the complex using ethylene. Zeise's salt received a great deal of attention during the second half of the 19th century because chemists could not explain its molecular structure. This question remained unanswered until the determination of its X-ray crystal structure in the 20th century. Zeise's salt stimulated much scientific research in the field of organometallic chemistry and would be key in defining new concepts in chemistry.

== Related compounds ==
- Zeise's dimer, [(η^{2}-C_{2}H_{4})PtCl_{2}]_{2}, derived from Zeise's salt by elimination of KCl followed by dimerisation.
- COD-platinum dichloride, (cyclooctadiene)PtCl_{2}, derived from platinum(II) chloride and 1,5-cyclooctadiene, is a common platinum(II) alkene complex.

Many other ethylene complexes have been prepared. For example, ethylenebis(triphenylphosphine)platinum(0), [(C_{6}H_{5})_{3}P]_{2}Pt(H_{2}C=CH_{2}), wherein the platinum is three-coordinate and in oxidation state 0 (Zeise's salt is a derivative of platinum(II)).

- Dichloro(ethylene)(α-methylbenzylamine)platinum(II) (PtCl_{2}(C_{2}H_{4})(PhCH(NH_{2})Me) is a chiral derivative of Zeise's salt that is used for the chiral resolution of alkenes.
