= William Christopher Zeise =

Danish organic chemist (1789–1847)

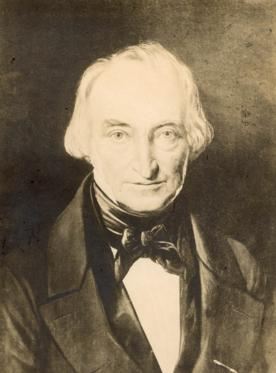
- Danish organic chemist
- Born: 15 October 1789; Slagelse, Denmark
- Died: 12 November 1847 (aged 58); Copenhagen, Denmark

William Christopher Zeise (15 October 1789 – 12 November 1847) was a Danish organic chemist. He is best known for synthesising one of the first organometallic compounds, named Zeise's salt in his honour. He also performed pioneering studies in organosulfur chemistry, discovering the xanthates in 1823.

== Early life ==
William Christopher Zeise was born 15 October 1789 in Slagelse, the son of apothecary Frederick Zeise (1754–1836), who was an old friend of physicist Hans Christian Ørsted's father. Zeise attended Slagelse Latin school with the poet Bernhard Severin Ingemann. He moved to Copenhagen in 1805 to take up an apprenticeship under Gottfried Becker as a pharmacy assistant (Apoteksmedhjælper) at the Royal Court Pharmacy. Becker, an accomplished chemist, was employed as extraordinary professor of chemistry at the University. However, Zeise felt dissatisfied there and returned home after only a few months, complaining of health issues.

Around this time, his interest in science (natural philosophy) began to develop. He familiarised himself with the new quantitative chemical theory of Antoine Lavoisier and read widely: Nicolai Tychsen's Apothekerkunst (Theoretical and practical instructions for Pharmacists, 1804); Gren's Chemistry; Adam Hauch's Principles of Natural Philosophy; and Ørsted's papers in Scandinavian Literature and Letters (his treatise on spontaneous combustion having made an especially strong impression upon him). Around this time, he experimented with a homemade voltaic pile.

At seventeen years of age, he rearranged his father's pharmacy in accordance with the new pharmacopoeia of 1805, which had imposed the antiphlogistic nomenclature. In the summer of 1806, he noted in his diary "a most remarkable awakening within me for something higher, for scientific creative work in general, but for Science, chiefly Chemistry, deeply and in particular". How strong an impression this inner experience had made on him can be established by the fact that he now wanted to return to Copenhagen, not to return to the Court apothecary, but to pursue a path the study of chemistry.

== Formal academic education ==
In autumn 1806, he was welcomed into the family home of Ørsted, where he was given a position as an assistant, helping Ørsted prepare his university lectures. His stay with Ørsted lasted several years. Ørsted later recounted how he had influenced Zeise through conversations and encouraged him when he expressed the desire to take the university entrance examination (examen artium). Ørsted spoke fondly of Zeise's independent spirit. Zeise became a university student in 1809.

Zeise had at first intended to study medicine, but while attending lectures it became clear that his interests had a broader scientific base; and chemistry remained his favourite subject. He still experimented in Ørsted's laboratory; but since at that time there was no prospect for a teaching position at the university, he took the pharmacist exam in 1815, later a master's degree (magisterkonferens), and on 21 October 1817 he defended his doctoral dissertation on The effect of alkalis upon organic substances. The experimental part of this work he performed in a small laboratory, which in 1816 he had converted from the pharmacy in Slagelse.

As the university had no separate lecturing chair in chemistry and no scientific laboratory, Zeise decided to work and study abroad in Germany and Paris. In 1818 he managed to gather travelling money. Zeise arrived in Göttingen, where he spent four months working in Friedrich Stromeyer's laboratory, one of the few experimental laboratories in Germany at that time. He was trained particularly in analytical chemistry, in which he would become a great master. Zeise next spent nearly a year in Paris. His diary entries reflect how diligent he was, and depict vividly the impression he got of the famous French scientists he came in contact with. In August 1818, while in Paris, Zeise became personally acquainted with the distinguished Swedish chemist Jöns Jacob Berzelius. Berzelius received the young Danish chemist with great benevolence, expressing his admiration for Zeise's doctoral thesis. They continued a respectful friendship thereafter, despite Zeise's being ten years younger than Berzelius.

== Independent academic career ==
Zeise returned to Denmark in the autumn of 1819. The prospects were not bright for an appointment at the University, although he was likely the only scientifically trained chemist in the country at that time. However, he learned at the end of the year that he had received public funds to support his work in science. That same year the university rented an apartment in Nørregade for use as a physics workshop and for physics education. Ørsted converted the apartment kitchen into a menial little laboratory, over which Zeise was made responsible. In this, the so-called Royal Science Laboratory, Zeise received ten students in the first year to whom he lectured, both in the laboratory and partly in the physical workshop.

In June 1822 Zeise was appointed extraordinary professor of Chemistry. In 1824, Professor Ørsted selected a nearby farm as the site for what would later become the Danish Polytechnic Education Institution. It was decided to transform the large stable building in the courtyard into a dedicated chemical laboratory. When the Polytechnic College was eventually founded in 1829, Zeise was instrumental in getting the chemical laboratory expanded and organised.He was professor of organic chemistry at the polytechnic from its opening until his death.

In 1823, while still in the small laboratory at Nørregade, he identified a new family of sulfur-containing compounds. He called them xanthates (from Greek xanthos "yellow") on account of the predominantly yellow colour of xanthate salts. Zeise was accordingly awarded a silver medal by the Royal Danish Academy of Sciences and Letters, and he became a member of that body the following year on the recommendation of Ørsted. In 1836 he became a Knight of the Order of the Dannebrog, a very high honour bestowed by the Danish monarch.

As a teacher, Zeise demanded strict accuracy, conscientiousness, order, and diligence from his pupils.

== Personal life ==
In February 1842, he married Maren Martine Bjerring and adopted her two children.

== Death ==
Zeise's health was fragile for much of his life and he suffered greatly, possibly due to his handling of noxious chemicals in poorly ventilated rooms. He died of tuberculosis in Copenhagen on 12 November 1847 and was buried in Assistens Cemetery in the same city.

== Scientific discoveries ==
A depiction of the chemical structure of Zeise's salt.

Zeise made several scientific discoveries. His discovery of mercaptans (thiols) in 1832 and thioethers in 1833, was once a weighty support for the influential (now obsolete) "Radical Theory" which Berzelius and Liebig developed, provoking important chemical studies. His discovery and work on xanthates, led to the widespread use of xanthate salts in synthetic chemistry.

In 1830, Zeise attempted to react platinum chloride with ethanol, leading to a series of platinum-based organometallic compounds. One of these compounds, originally referred to by Zeise himself as “sal kalicoplatinicus inflammabilis”, was subsequently named after him according to the tradition of the day – it is still called Zeise's salt. Zeise's claim that the newly discovered salt contained ethylene was received with distrust by Justus von Liebig, whose understandable attacks on Zeise were quite unjustified. The complex indeed contains ethylene. Attempts to establish the correct structure and composition of Zeise's salt drove much basic research during the second half of the 19th century and led to a greater sophistication in organometallic chemistry. The structure of Zeise's salt was definitively resolved only with the advent of X-ray crystallography and the nature of its platinum to ethylene bond was not understood until the development of the Dewar–Chatt–Duncanson model in the 1950s.

Shortly before he died, Zeise published his attempts to purify the pigment carotene from carrot juice while in the Polytechnic Institute; finding it to be soluble in carbon disulfide and correctly identifying it as a hydrocarbon.

Nearly a quarter of a century later Zeise’s views were fully vindicated by two scientists at the Royal College of Chemistry in London; Peter Griess and Carl Alexander von Martius confirmed Zeise’s formula and proved that ethylene was liberated when Zeise’s salt was decomposed.

== Publications ==
Zeise’s publications include;

- Udførlig Fremstilling af Chemiens Hovedlærdomme saavel i theoretisk som practisk Henseende (1821)
- De chlorido platinae et alcohole vini sese invicem permutantibus nec non de novis substantiis inde oriundis. (1830)
- Ueber das Verhalten des Chlorplatins zum Alkohol und die Producte ihrer Wechselwirkung nebst einem Anhang uber Platinalampen und Lampenessig, sowie uber Chlorather und schweren Salzather (1831)
- Reisedagbøger
- Videnskabelige papirer
