= Dichloro(1,5-cyclooctadiene)palladium =

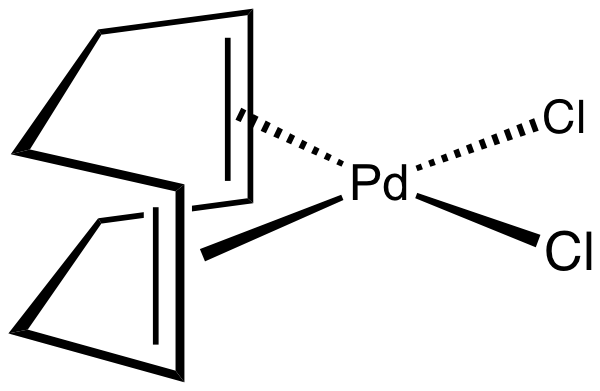

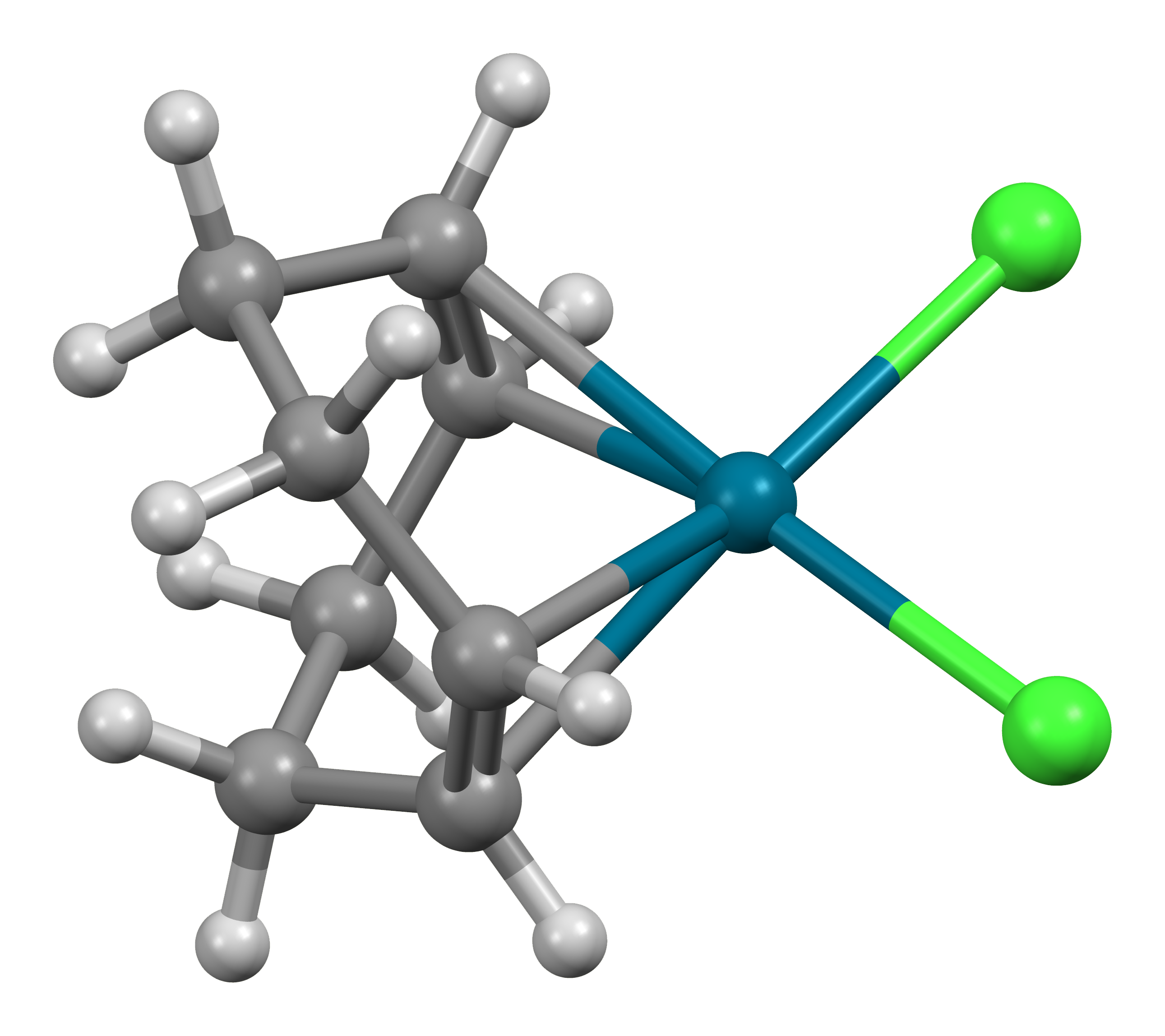

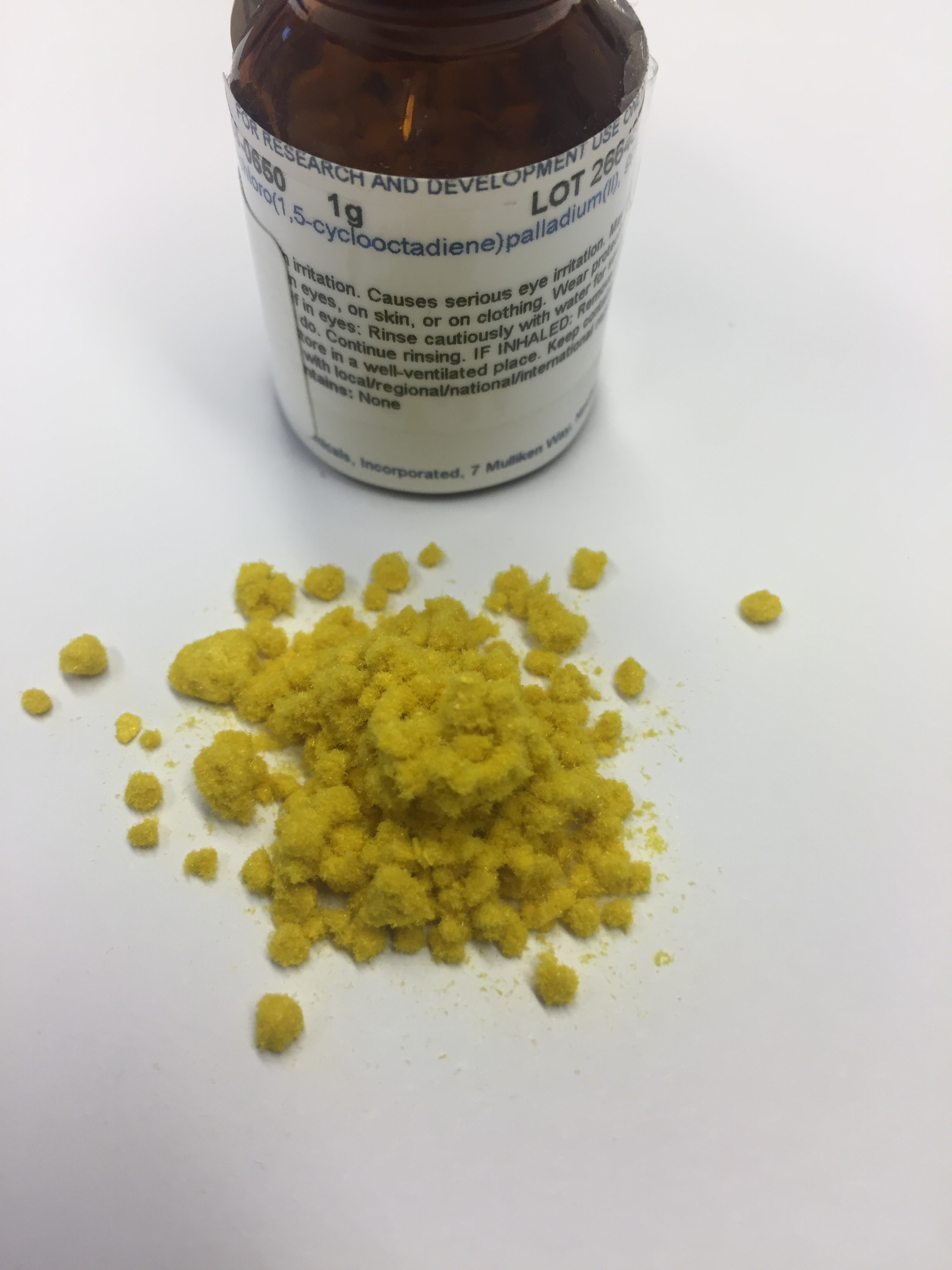

Identifiers
CAS Number	12107-56-1
3D model (JSmol)	Interactive image
ChemSpider	4642864
ECHA InfoCard	100.031.953
EC Number	235-161-8
PubChem CID	5702536
UNII	SK5GRF586M
CompTox Dashboard (EPA)	DTXSID00923664
- InChI: InChI=1S/C8H12.2ClH.Pd/c1-2-4-6-8-7-5-3-1;;;/h1-2,7-8H,3-6H2;2*1H;/q;;;+2/p-2/b2-1-,8-7-;;; Key: RRHPTXZOMDSKRS-PHFPKPIQSA-L
- SMILES: C1CC=CCCC=C1.Cl[Pd]Cl

Properties
Chemical formula	C_{8}H_{12}Cl_{2}Pd
Molar mass	285.50 g·mol^{−1}
Appearance	yellow solid
Density	2.045 g/cm^{3}
Melting point	210 °C (410 °F; 483 K)

Hazards
- GHS labelling
Pictograms	(GHS07: Exclamation mark)
Signal word	Warning
Hazard statements	H315, H319, H335
Precautionary statements	P261, P264, P271, P280, P302+P352, P304+P340, P305+P351+P338, P312, P321, P332+P313, P337+P313, P362, P403+P233, P405, P501
- Except where otherwise noted, data are given for materials in their standard state (at 25 °C [77 °F], 100 kPa). Infobox references

Dichloro(1,5-cyclooctadiene)palladium is the organopalladium compound with the formula PdCl_{2}(C_{8}H_{12}) where C_{8}H_{12} is cycloocta-1,5-diene (cod) or abbreviated PdCl_{2}(cod). It is a yellow solid that is soluble in chloroform. According to X-ray crystallography, the Pd center is square planar. This complex can be synthesized by reaction of tetrachloropalladate in hydrochloric acid with cycloocta-1,5-diene. A mechanochemical synthesis combines PdCl_{2} and cod.

== See also ==
- Dichloro(cycloocta-1,5-diene)platinum(II)
