= Organopalladium chemistry =

Organopalladium chemistry is a branch of organometallic chemistry that deals with organic palladium compounds and their reactions. Palladium is often used as a catalyst in the reduction of alkenes and alkynes with hydrogen. This process involves the formation of a palladium-carbon covalent bond. Palladium is also prominent in carbon-carbon coupling reactions, as demonstrated in tandem reactions.

== Organopalladium chemistry timeline ==
- 1873 - A. N. Zaitsev reports reduction of benzophenone over palladium with hydrogen.
- 1894 - Francis Phillips reports that palladium(II) chloride reduces to palladium metal by contact with ethylene.
- 1907 - Autoclave technology introduced by Vladimir Ipatieff makes it possible to carry out high pressure hydrogenation.
- 1956 - In the Wacker process ethylene and oxygen react to acetaldehyde with catalyst PdCl_{2}/CuCl_{2}. During process development, Walter Hafner also identifies the first allylpalladium complex.
- 1957 - Tetrakis(triphenylphosphine)palladium(0) is reported by Malatesta and Angoletta.
- 1972 - The Heck reaction is a coupling reaction of a halogenide with an olefin. Pd(0) intermediates are implicated.
- 1973 - The Trost asymmetric allylic alkylation is a nucleophilic substitution.
- 1975 - The Sonogashira coupling is a coupling reaction of terminal alkynes with aryl or vinyl halides.
- 1994 - The Pd-catalyzed Buchwald-Hartwig amination for C-N bond-forming reactions.

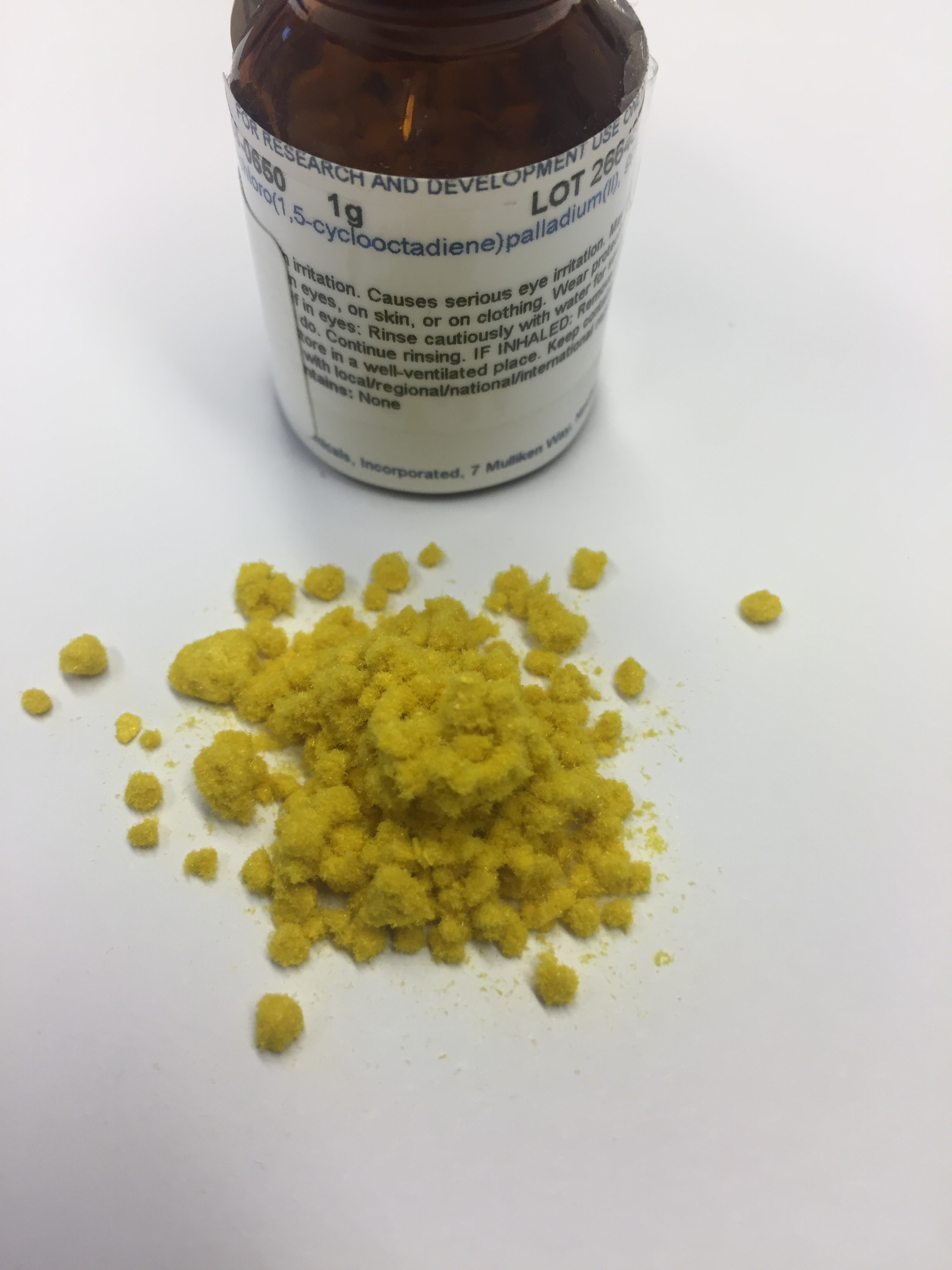
Sample of PdCl_{2}(1,5-cyclooctadiene).

== Palladium(II) ==
=== Alkene complexes ===
Unlike Ni(II), but similar to Pt(II), Pd(II) halides form a variety of alkene complexes. The premier example is dichloro(1,5‐cyclooctadiene)palladium. In this complex, the diene is easily displaced, which makes it a favored precursor to catalysts. In the industrially important Wacker process, ethylene is converted to acetaldehyde via nucleophilic attack of hydroxide on a Pd(II)-ethylene intermediate followed by formation of a vinyl alcohol complex. Fullerene ligands also bind with palladium(II).

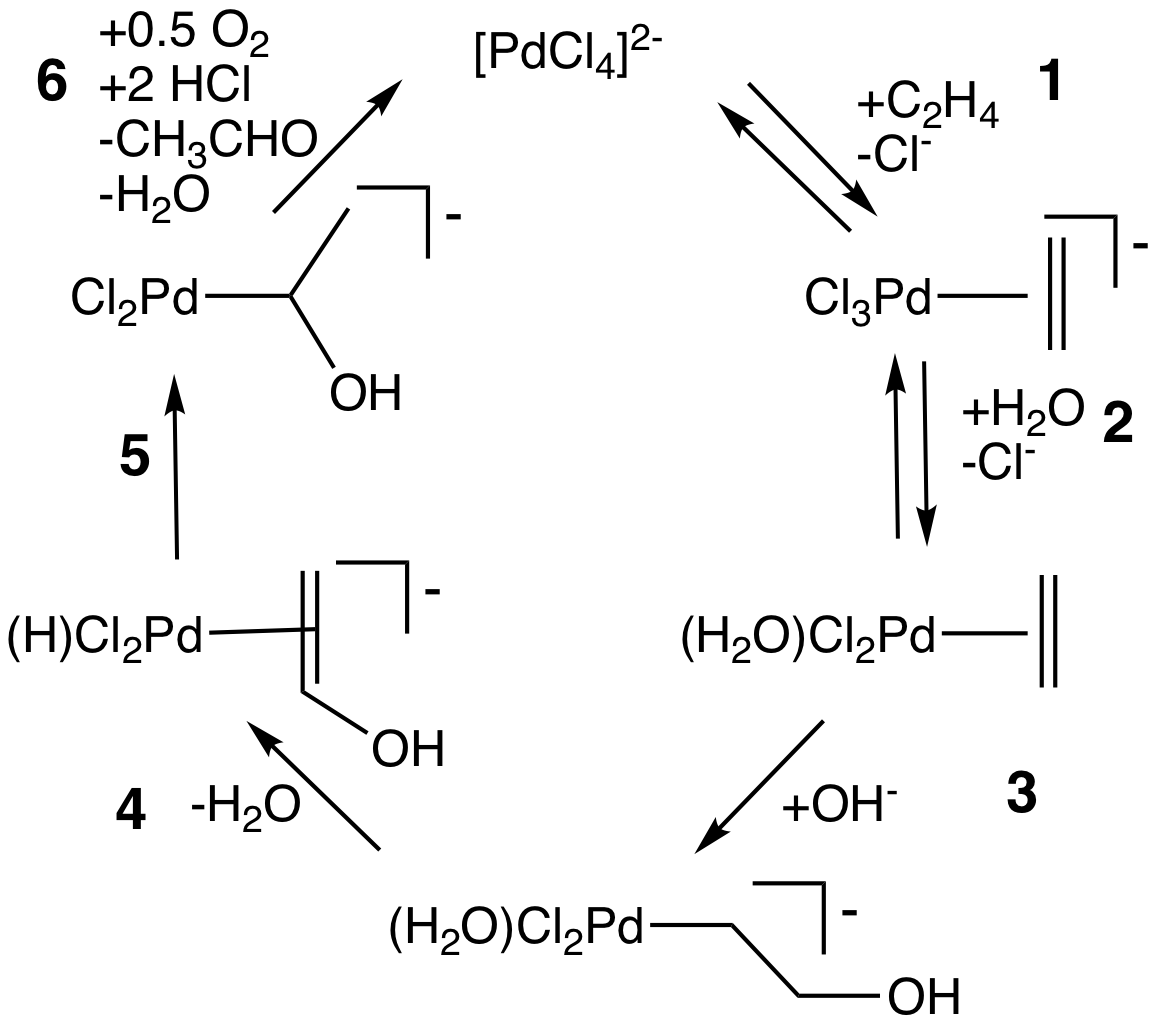
Catalytic cycle for the industrially significant Wacker Process for oxidation of ethylene to acetaldehyde

Palladium(II) acetate and related compounds are common reagents because the carboxylates are good leaving groups with basic properties. For example palladium trifluoroacetate has been demonstrated to be effective in aromatic decarboxylation:

=== Allyl complexes ===
The iconic complex in this series is allylpalladium chloride dimer (APC). Allyl compounds with suitable leaving groups react with palladium(II) salts to pi-allyl complexes having hapticity 3. These intermediates too react with nucleophiles for example carbanions derived from malonate esters or with amines in allylic amination as depicted below

Allylpalladium intermediates also feature in the Trost asymmetric allylic alkylation and the Carroll rearrangement and an oxo variation in the Saegusa oxidation.

=== Palladium-carbon sigma-bonded complexes ===
Various organic groups can bound to palladium and form stable sigma-bonded complexes. The stability of the bonds in terms of bond dissociation energy follows the trend: Pd-Alkynyl > Pd-Vinyl ≈ Pd-Aryl > Pd-Alkyl and the metal-carbon bond length changes in the opposite direction: Pd-Alkynyl < Pd-Vinyl ≈ Pd-Aryl < Pd-Alkyl.

== Palladium(0) compounds ==
Zerovalent Pd(0) compounds include tris(dibenzylideneacetone)dipalladium(0) and tetrakis(triphenylphosphine)palladium(0). These complexes react with halocarbon R-X in oxidative addition to R-Pd-X intermediates with covalent Pd-C bonds. This chemistry forms the basis of a large class of organic reactions called coupling reactions (see palladium-catalyzed coupling reactions). An example is the Sonogashira reaction:

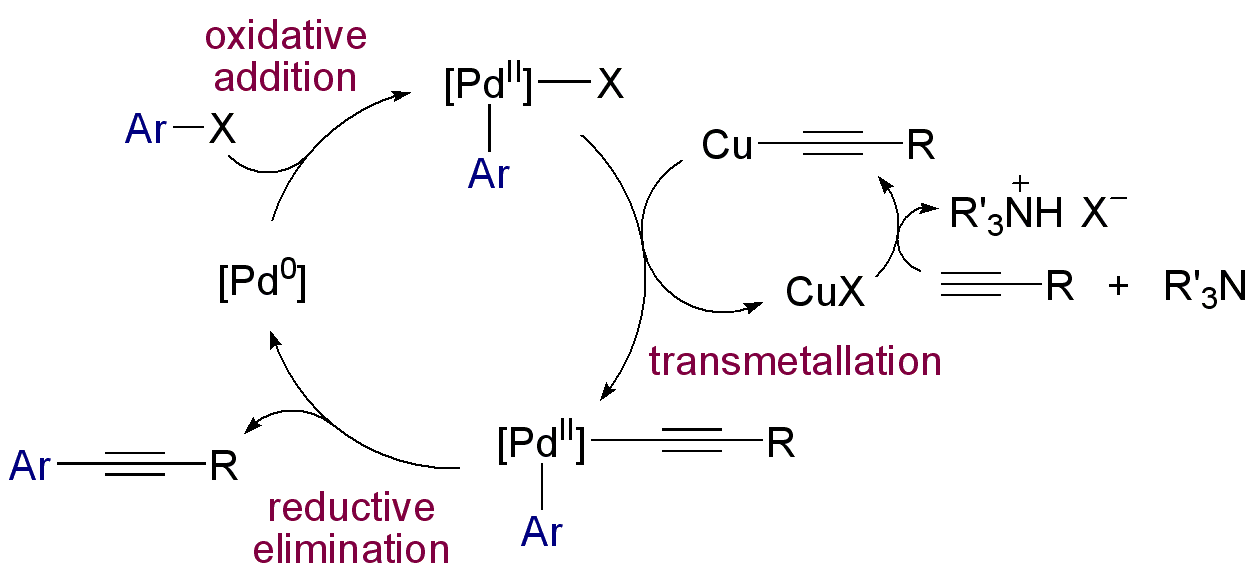

== Organopalladium(IV) ==
The first organopalladium(IV) compound was described in 1986. This complex is Me_{3}Pd(IV)(I)bpy (bpy = bidentate 2,2'-bipyridine ligand) It was synthesized by oxidative addition of methyl iodide to Me_{2}Pd(II)bpy.

Palladium compounds owe their reactivity to the ease of interconversion between Pd(0) and palladium(II) intermediates. There is no conclusive evidence however for the involvement of Pd(II) to Pd(IV) conversions in palladium mediated organometallic reactions. One reaction invoking such mechanism was described in 2000 and concerned a Heck reaction. This reaction was accompanied by a 1,5-hydrogen shift in the presence of amines:

The hydride shift was envisaged as taking place through a Pd(IV) metallacycle:

In related work the intermediate associated with the hydride shift remains Pd(II):

and in other work (a novel synthesis of indoles with two Pd migrations) equilibria are postulated between different palladacycles:

and in certain intramolecular couplings synthetic value was demonstrated regardless of oxidation state:

== See also ==
- Palladium compounds
