= 1,5-Cyclooctadiene =

- Skeletal formula of 1,5-cyclooctadiene

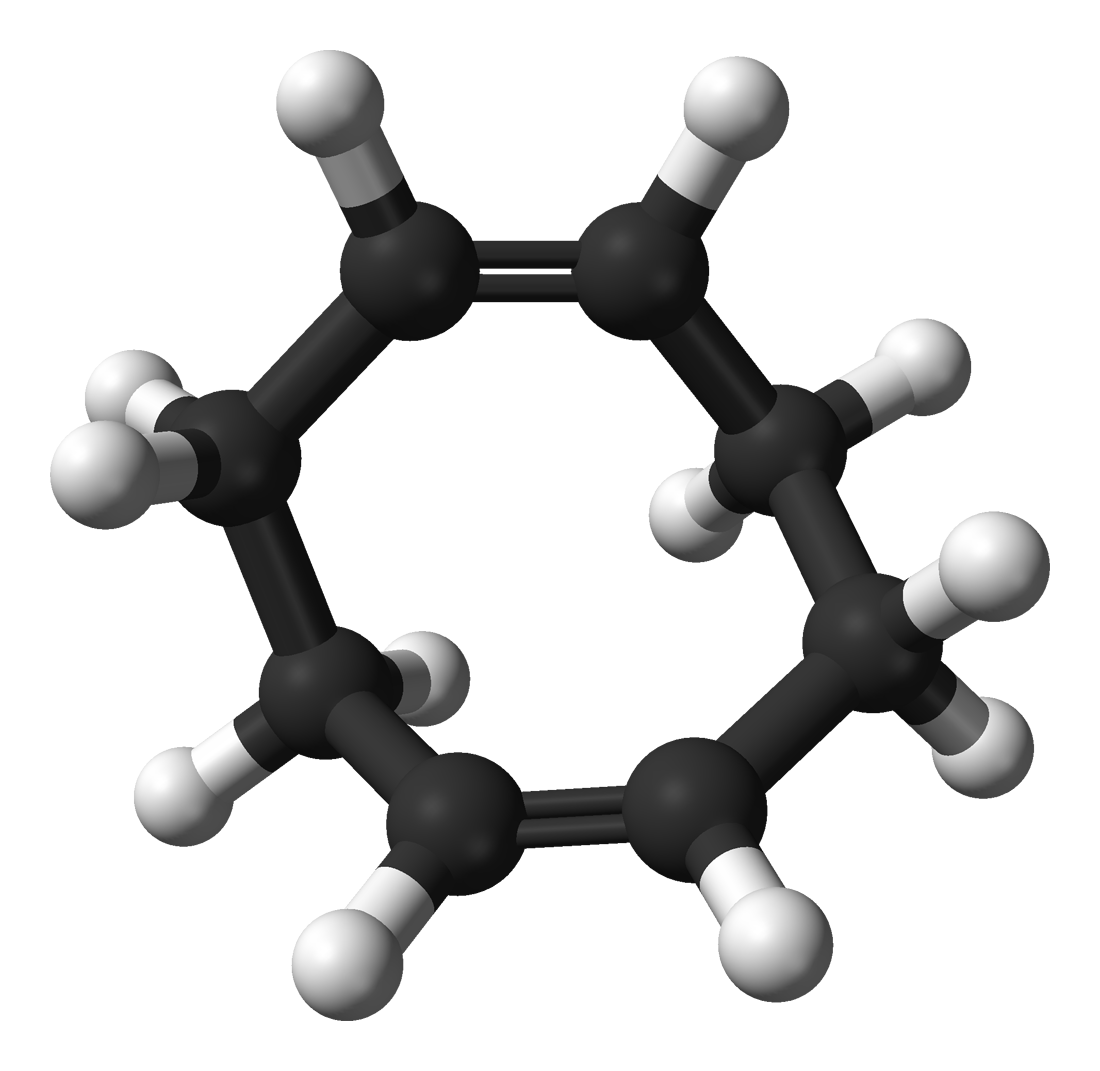
- Ball and stick model of 1,5-cyclooctadiene

Names
- Preferred IUPAC name Cycloocta-1,5-diene

Identifiers
CAS Number	111-78-4; 1552-12-1 (Z,Z); 5259-71-2 (Z,E); 17612-50-9 (E,E)
3D model (JSmol)	Interactive image
Abbreviations	1,5-COD
Beilstein Reference	2036542 1209288 (Z,Z)
ChemSpider	7843; 74815 (Z,Z); 18520443 (Z,E); 19971660 (E,E)
ECHA InfoCard	100.003.552
EC Number	203-907-1
MeSH	1,5-cyclooctadiene
PubChem CID	8135; 82916 (Z,Z); 5364364 (Z,E); 5702534 (E,E)
RTECS number	GX9560000 GX9620000 (Z,Z)
UNII	1E1VVD385Z
UN number	2520
CompTox Dashboard (EPA)	DTXSID0026888
- InChI: InChI=1S/C8H12/c1-2-4-6-8-7-5-3-1/h1-2,7-8H,3-6H2/b2-1-,8-7- Key: VYXHVRARDIDEHS-QGTKBVGQSA-N; InChI=1/C8H12/c1-2-4-6-8-7-5-3-1/h1-2,7-8H,3-6H2/b2-1-,8-7- Key: VYXHVRARDIDEHS-QGTKBVGQBM
- SMILES: C1CC=CCCC=C1

Properties
Chemical formula	C_{8}H_{12}
Molar mass	108.184 g·mol^{−1}
Appearance	Colorless liquid
Density	0.882 g/mL
Melting point	−69 °C; −92 °F; 204 K
Boiling point	150 °C; 302 °F; 423 K
Vapor pressure	910 Pa
Refractive index (n_{D})	1.493

Thermochemistry
Heat capacity (C)	198.9 J K^{−1} mol^{−1}
Std molar entropy (S^{⦵}_{298})	250.0 J K^{−1} mol^{−1}
Std enthalpy of formation (Δ_{f}H^{⦵}_{298})	21–27 kJ mol^{−1}
Std enthalpy of combustion (Δ_{c}H^{⦵}_{298})	−4.890 – −4.884 MJ mol^{−1}

Hazards
- GHS labelling
Pictograms	(GHS02: Flammable) (GHS08: Health hazard)
Signal word	Danger
Hazard statements	H226, H304, H315, H317, H319, H334
Precautionary statements	P261, P280, P301+P310, P305+P351+P338, P331, P342+P311
Flash point	32 to 38 °C (90 to 100 °F; 305 to 311 K)
Autoignition temperature	222 °C (432 °F; 495 K)
- Except where otherwise noted, data are given for materials in their standard state (at 25 °C [77 °F], 100 kPa). verify (what is ?) Infobox references

1,5-Cyclooctadiene (also known as cycloocta-1,5-diene) is a cyclic hydrocarbon (a cycloalkene) with the chemical formula C_{8}H_{12}, specifically [−(CH_{2})_{2}−CH=CH−]_{2}.

There are three configurational isomers with this structure, that differ by the arrangement of the four C–C single bonds adjacent to the double bonds. Each pair of single bonds can be on the same side (cis,Z) or on opposite sides (trans,E) of the double bond's plane; the three possibilities are denoted cis,cis, trans,trans, and cis,trans; or (Z,Z), (E,E), and (Z,E). (Because of overall symmetry, trans,cis is the same configuration as cis,trans.)

Generally abbreviated COD, the cis,cis isomer of this diene is a useful precursor to other organic compounds and serves as a ligand in organometallic chemistry. It is a colorless liquid with a strong odor. 1,5-Cyclooctadiene can be prepared by dimerization of butadiene in the presence of a nickel or iron catalyst, a coproduct being vinylcyclohexene. Approximately 10,000 tons were produced in 2005.

== Organic reactions ==
COD reacts with borane to give 9-borabicyclo[3.3.1]nonane, commonly known as 9-BBN, a reagent in organic chemistry used in hydroborations:

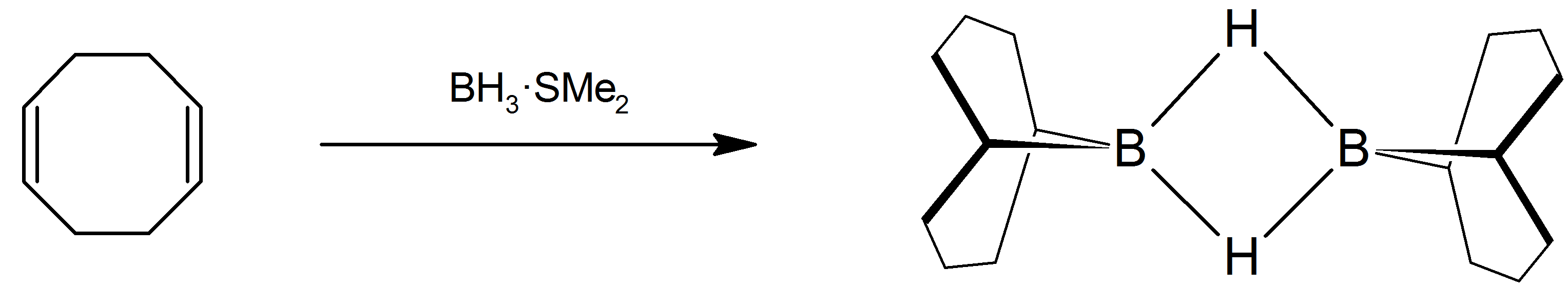

COD adds SCl_{2} (or similar reagents) to give 2,6-dichloro-9-thiabicyclo[3.3.1]nonane:

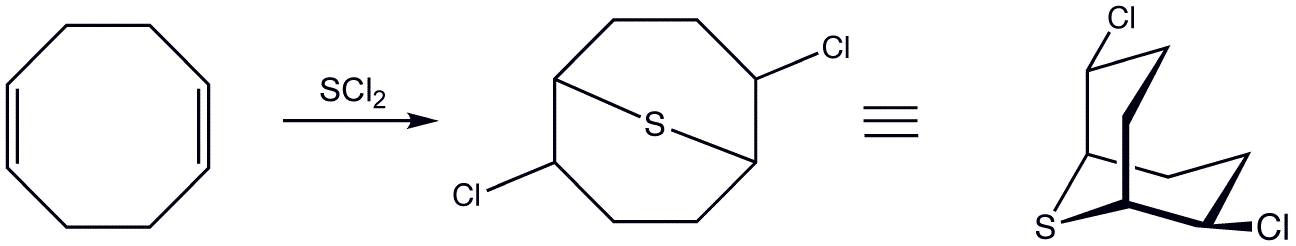

The resulting dichloride can be further modified as the diazide or dicyano derivative in a nucleophilic substitution aided by anchimeric assistance.

COD is used as an intermediate in one of the syntheses of disparlure, a gypsy moth pheromone.

== Metal complexes ==
Selected metal 1,5-COD complexes.

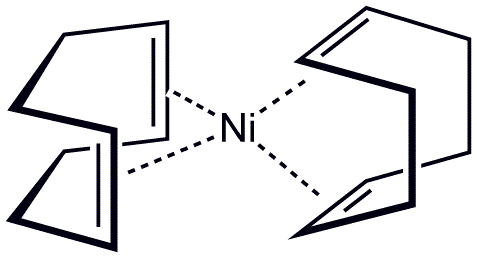
Bis(cyclooctadiene)nickel(0).

Crabtree's catalyst.

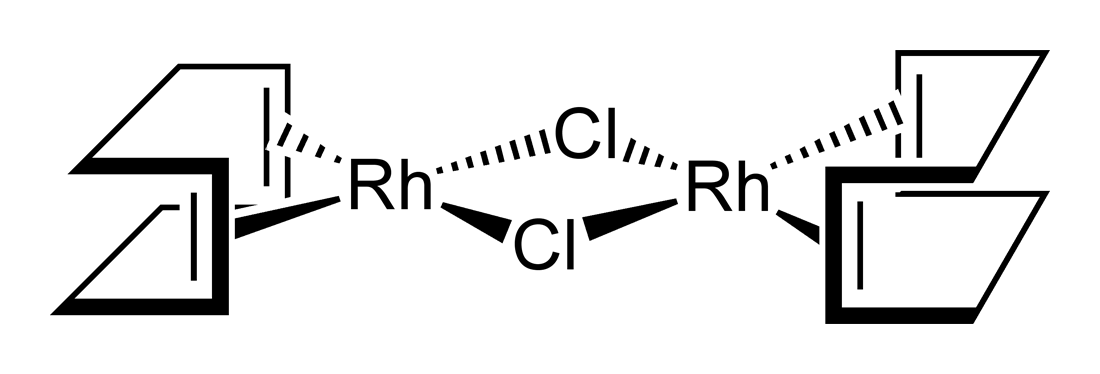
The complex Rh_{2}(COD)_{2}Cl_{2}.

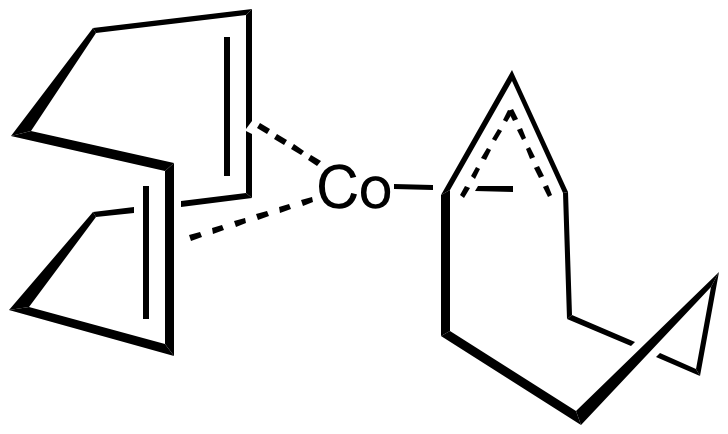
Co(1,5-cyclooctadiene)(cyclooctenyl).

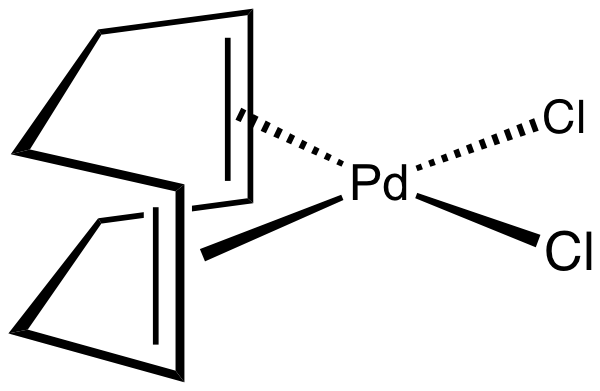
Dichloro(1,5-cyclooctadiene)palladium

cyclooctadiene iridium chloride dimer

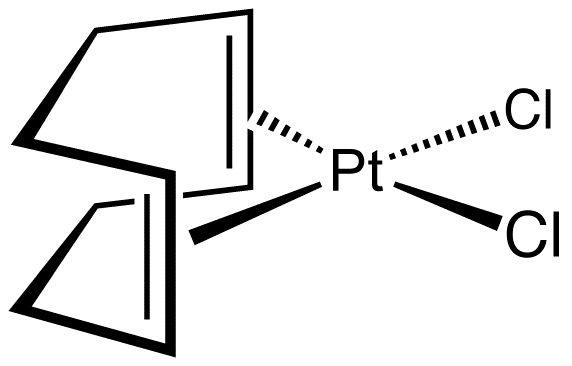
Dichloro(1,5-cyclooctadiene)platinum

1,5-COD binds to low-valent metals via both alkene groups. Metal-COD complexes are attractive because they are sufficiently stable to be isolated, often being more robust than related ethylene complexes. The stability of COD complexes is attributable to the chelate effect. The COD ligands are easily displaced by other ligands, such as phosphines.

Ni(COD)_{2} is prepared by reduction of anhydrous nickel acetylacetonate in the presence of the ligand, using triethylaluminium

1/3[Ni(C_{5}H_{7}O_{2})_{2}]_{3} + 2COD + 2Al(C_{2}H_{5})_{3} → Ni(COD)_{2} + 2Al(C_{2}H_{5})_{2}(C_{5}H_{7}O_{2}) + C_{2}H_{4} + C_{2}H_{6}

The related Pt(COD)_{2} is prepared by a more circuitous route involving the dilithium cyclooctatetraene:

Li_{2}C_{8}H_{8} + PtCl_{2}(COD) + 3C_{7}H_{10} → [Pt(C_{7}H_{10})_{3}] + 2LiCl + C_{8}H_{8} + C_{8}H_{12}
Pt(C_{7}H_{10})_{3} + 2COD → Pt(COD)_{2} + 3C_{7}H_{10}

Extensive work has been reported on complexes of COD, much of which has been described in volumes 25, 26, and 28 of Inorganic Syntheses. The platinum complex is a precursor to a 16-electron complex of ethylene:

Pt(COD)_{2} + 3C_{2}H_{4} → Pt(C_{2}H_{4})_{3} + 2COD

COD complexes are useful as starting materials; one noteworthy example is the reaction:

Ni(COD)_{2} + 4CO → Ni(CO)_{4} + 2COD

The product Ni(CO)_{4} is highly toxic, thus it is advantageous to generate it in the reaction vessel upon demand. Other low-valent metal complexes of COD include cyclooctadiene rhodium chloride dimer, cyclooctadiene iridium chloride dimer, and Fe(COD)(CO)_{3}, and Crabtree's catalyst.

The M(COD)_{2} complexes with nickel, palladium, and platinum have tetrahedral geometry, whereas [M(COD)_{2}]^{+} complexes of rhodium and iridium are square planar.

== (E,E)-COD ==
E,E-COD synthesis (Stöckmann et al. 2011)

The highly strained trans,trans isomer of 1,5-cyclooctadiene is a known compound. (E,E)-COD was first synthesized by George M. Whitesides and Arthur C. Cope in 1969 by photoisomerization of the cis,cis compound. Another synthesis (double elimination reaction from a cyclooctane ring) was reported by Rolf Huisgen in 1987. The molecular conformation of (E,E)-COD is twisted rather than chair-like. The compound has been investigated as a click chemistry mediator.

== Related compounds ==
- Dibenzocyclooctatetraene
