= Karstedt's catalyst =

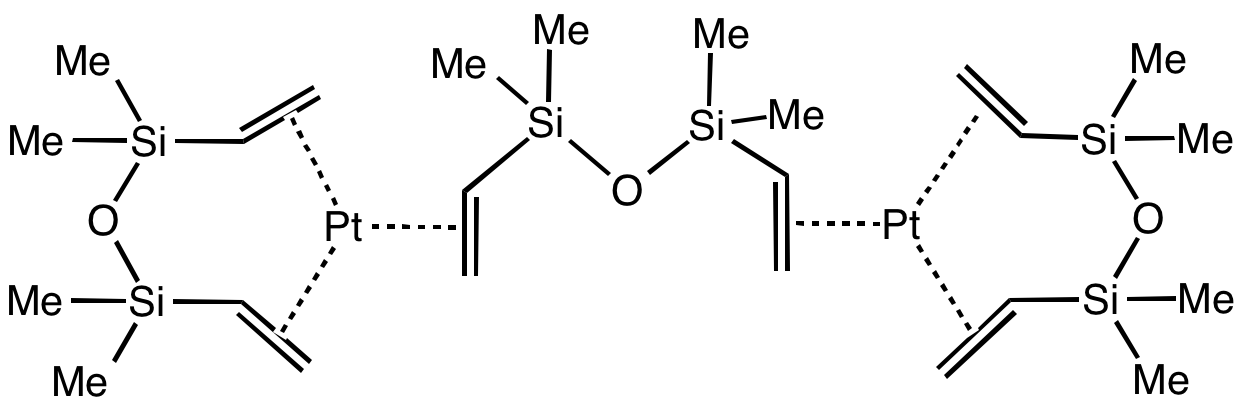

Identifiers
CAS Number	11057-89-9
3D model (JSmol)	Interactive image
ChemSpider	9135105
EC Number	270-844-4
PubChem CID	10959889
UN number	1307
- InChI: InChI=1S/C8H18OSi2.Pt/c1-7-10(3,4)9-11(5,6)8-2;/h7-8H,1-2H2,3-6H3; Key: RCNRJBWHLARWRP-UHFFFAOYSA-N
- SMILES: C[Si](C)(C=C)O[Si](C)(C)C=C.[Pt]

Properties
Chemical formula	C_{24}H_{54}O_{3}Pt_{2}Si_{6}
Molar mass	949.4 g/mol
Appearance	colorless solid
Density	1.74 g/cm^{3}
Melting point	12 to 13 °C (54 to 55 °F; 285 to 286 K)
Boiling point	139 °C (282 °F; 412 K)
Solubility in water	insoluble

Hazards
- GHS labelling
Pictograms	(GHS02: Flammable) (GHS07: Exclamation mark) (GHS08: Health hazard)
Signal word	Danger
Hazard statements	H226, H304, H312, H315, H319, H332, H335, H373
Precautionary statements	P210, P260, P280, P301+P310, P305+P351+P338, P370+P378
Flash point	86
- Except where otherwise noted, data are given for materials in their standard state (at 25 °C [77 °F], 100 kPa). Infobox references

Karstedt's catalyst is an organoplatinum compound derived from divinyl-containing disiloxane. This coordination complex is widely used in hydrosilylation catalysis. It is a colorless solid that is generally assumed to be a mixture of related Pt(0) alkene complexes. The catalyst is named after Bruce D. Karstedt, who developed it in the early 1970s while working for General Electric.

== Applications ==
Carbon-silicon bonds are often generated via hydrosilylation of alkenes. This reaction has very important applications to industry. While it is favorable thermodynamically, hydrosilylation does not proceed in the absence of a catalyst, such as Karstedt's catalyst. The catalyst is produced by treatment of chloroplatinic acid by the divinyltetramethyldisiloxane.

The catalyst can also be used in a reductive amination reaction between a carboxylic acid and an amine with phenylsilane as the reducing agent.

== Structure and bonding ==
The oxidation state of the platinum is 0. Using X-ray crystallography, the structure of Pt_{2}[(Me_{2}SiCH=CH_{2})_{2}O]_{3} has been confirmed. Each Pt(0) center is surrounded by three alkene ligands provided by three 1,1,3,3-tetramethyl-1,3-divinyldisiloxane ligands. The Pt center and six coordinated carbon atoms are approximately coplanar, as found for simpler complexes such as Pt(C_{2}H_{4})_{3}.
