= Dichloro(cycloocta-1,5-diene)platinum(II) =

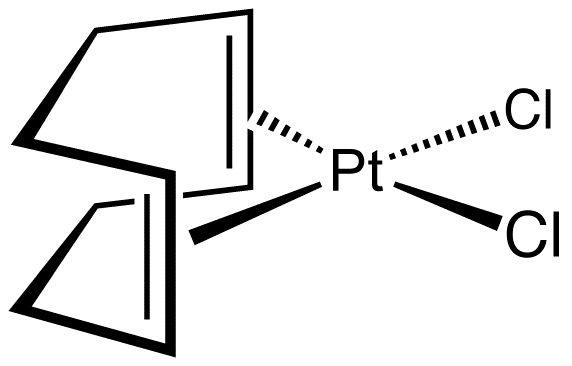

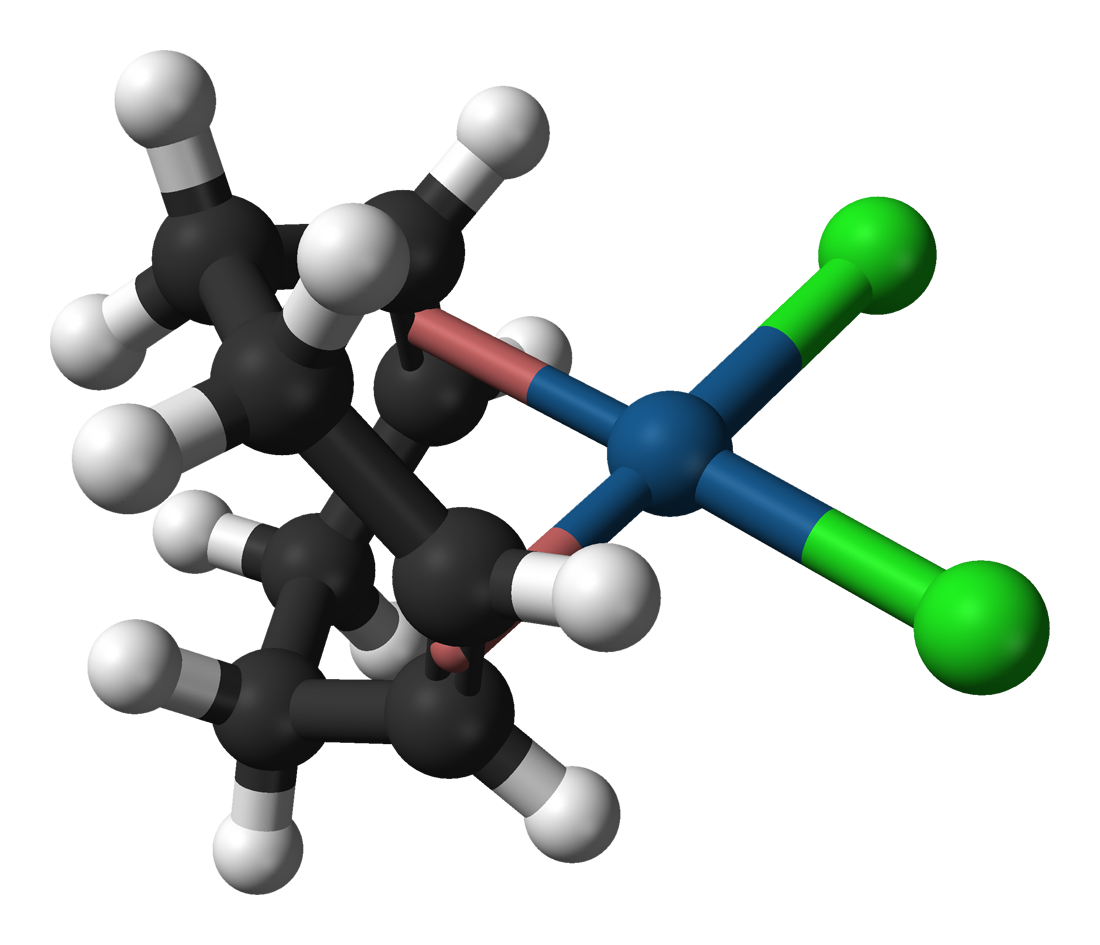

Identifiers
CAS Number	12080-32-9
3D model (JSmol)	Interactive image
ChemSpider	4642949
ECHA InfoCard	100.031.937
EC Number	235-144-5
PubChem CID	5702648
UNII	P4ZP76Z957
CompTox Dashboard (EPA)	DTXSID00923563
- InChI: InChI=1S/C8H12.2ClH.Pt/c1-2-4-6-8-7-5-3-1;;;/h1-2,7-8H,3-6H2;2*1H;/q;;;+2/p-2/b2-1-,8-7-;;; Key: VVAOPCKKNIUEEU-PHFPKPIQSA-L; InChI=1/C8H12.2ClH.Pt/c1-2-4-6-8-7-5-3-1;;;/h1-2,7-8H,3-6H2;2*1H;/q;;;+2/p-2/b2-1-,8-7-;;; Key: VVAOPCKKNIUEEU-AUZMAREFBX
- SMILES: Cl[Pt]Cl.C\1=C\CC/C=C\CC/1

Properties
Chemical formula	C_{8}H_{12}Cl_{2}Pt
Molar mass	374.17 g·mol^{−1}
Melting point	285 °C (545 °F; 558 K)

Hazards
- GHS labelling
Pictograms	(GHS07: Exclamation mark)
Signal word	Warning
Hazard statements	H315, H319, H335
Precautionary statements	P261, P264, P271, P280, P302+P352, P304+P340, P305+P351+P338, P312, P321, P332+P313, P337+P313, P362, P403+P233, P405, P501
- Except where otherwise noted, data are given for materials in their standard state (at 25 °C [77 °F], 100 kPa). verify (what is ?) Infobox references

Dichloro(1,5-cyclooctadiene)platinum(II) (Pt(cod)Cl_{2}) is an organometallic compound of platinum. This colourless solid is an entry point to other platinum compounds through the displacement of the cod and/or chloride ligands. It is one of several complexes of cycloocta-1,5-diene.

Dichloro(1,5-cyclooctadiene)platinum(II) is prepared by treating potassium tetrachloroplatinate with the diene:

K_{2}PtCl_{4} + C_{8}H_{12} → PtCl_{2}C_{8}H_{12} + 2 KCl

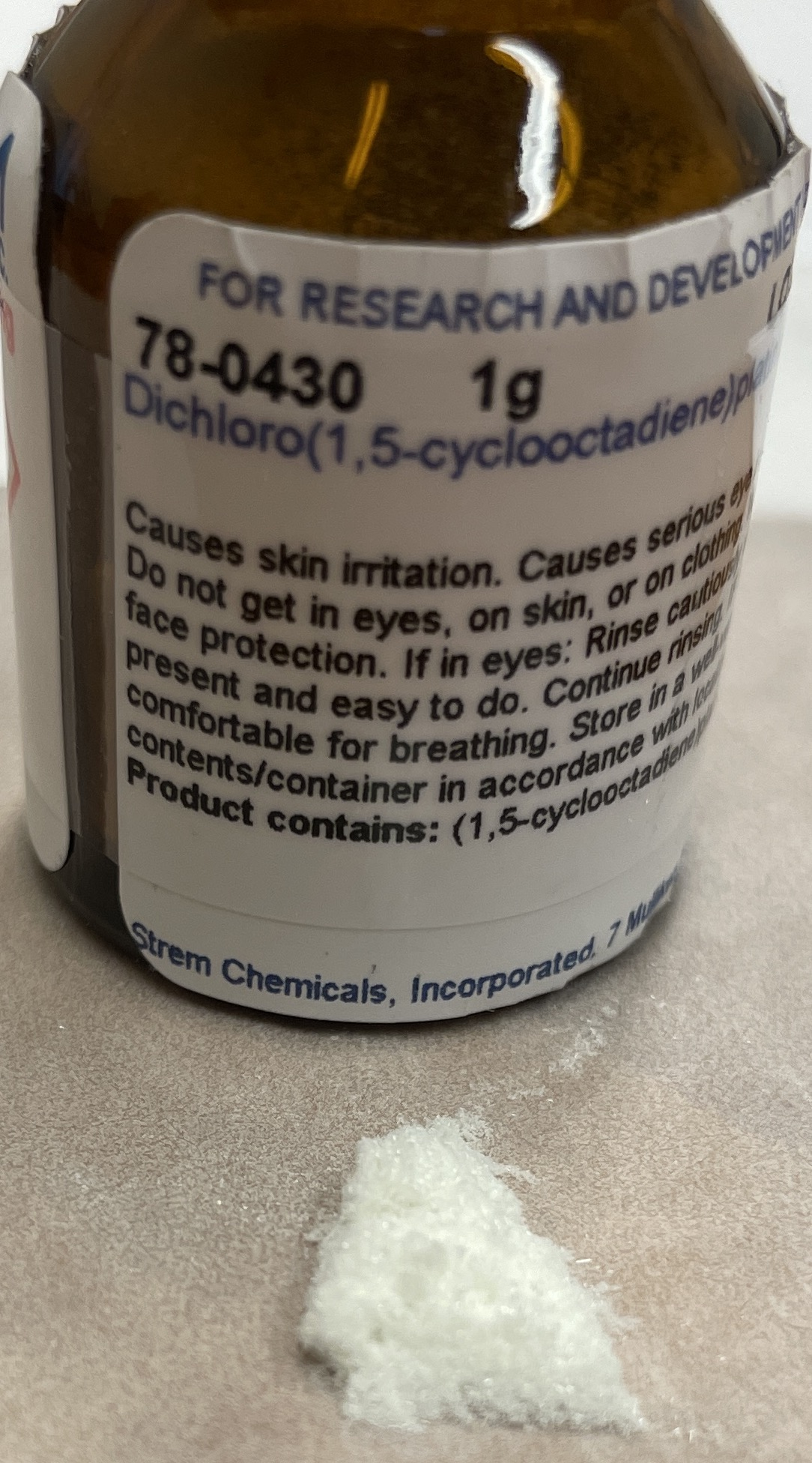
Sample of Pt(cod)Cl_{2}.

It can also be prepared by a mechanochemical method starting with PtCl_{2}.

According to X-ray crystallography, the complex is square planar.

== See also ==
- Dichloro(1,5‐cyclooctadiene)palladium
