= Chelated platinum =

Ionized form of platinum

Chelated platinum is an ionized form of platinum that forms two or more bonds with a counter ion. Some platinum chelates are claimed to have antimicrobial activity.

== Synthesis ==
Although the concept and practical use of metal chelation is common, chelation of inert metals, such as platinum, has been rarely reported and the yield was extremely low. To produce chelated platinum solution, tetraammonium EDTA, NTA, DTPA or HEDTA type chelating agent was mixed with platinum or platinum chemical compounds. The resulting chelated platinum would be in 4 forms:

- EDTA: (i) (NH_{4})_{4}-(EDTA)n•Pt, (ii) (NH_{4})_{4}-n(EDTA•Pt), (iii) K_{4}-n(EDTA•Pt) or (iv) K_{2}-n(EDTA•Pt).
- NTA: (i) (NH_{4})_{4}-(NTA)n•Pt, (ii) (NH_{4})_{4}-n(NTA•Pt), (iii) K_{4}-n(NTA•Pt) or (iv) K_{2}-n(NTA•Pt).
- DTPA: (i) (NH_{4})_{4}-(DTPA)n•Pt, (ii) (NH_{4})_{4}-n(DTPA•Pt), (iii) K_{4}-n(DTPA•Pt) or (iv) K_{2}-n(DTPA•Pt).
- HEDTA: (i) (NH_{4})_{4}-(HEDTA)n•Pt, (ii) (NH_{4})_{4}-n(HEDTA•Pt), (iii) K_{4}-n(HEDTA•Pt) or (iv) K_{2}-n(HEDTA•Pt).

The core technique was the usage of a bridge-type heterogeneous chelation architecture to capture metal in a stable water-soluble state. Surprisingly, platinum ion in this particular multi-phase bridged chelated state is amazingly stable. Chelated platinum solution is in the form of high energy dielectric aqueous solution.

Silver, platinum and gold are best known precious metals. However, from a more comprehensive and chemistry point of view, they should be described as inert metals. Inert metals are very stable. They are difficult to participate directly in ordinary acid-base reactions and turn into metal compounds. Therefore, they can stay alone in the form of single element in nature. To turn silver, platinum and gold into metal complex, it can only be performed in very special and particular reaction environment. Furthermore, it is much more difficult to make inert metals into its chelated form which is stable in acidic and basic conditions. The critical reason is that it should undergo a treatment process that involve a great amount of energy in order to achieve a water-soluble state.

== Antimicrobial and antiviral properties ==
Generally, it is not a simple process to turn an inert precious metal directly into its water-soluble ionic state. Material under high energy treatment would gain certain amount of energy according to energy storage effect. Therefore, when inert metal directly turns into its ionic water-soluble state under high energy treatment, it is certain that this aqueous solution would possess large amount of energy. Due to the high energy state and dielectric properties of platinum metal ion in chelated state, the energy conversion at the contact point between platinum ion and bacteria, which is similar to the situation of electrical short circuit, would lead to cell burst and trigger bactericidal effect. Furthermore, platinum ion in chelated state is much more stable than ordinary metal ion in aqueous solution. Also, the concentration and density of chelated platinum ion can be freely adjusted, this characteristic provides effective concentration for anti-microbial and anti-viral activity. Besides, platinum is known to be the best catalyst in the world. The concept of catalyst is that on one hand it triggers catalyzing and reversible reactions, but on the other hand, it does not involve directly in the chemical reaction. Thus, during the microbial eliminating process, there is no deterioration in chelated platinum ion content, such that the bactericidal effective can be continued and sustainable.

Besides the effect surface energy, it is also speculated that the antimicrobial and antiviral properties of platinum would involve the following aspects. Same as other antimicrobial and antiviral metal ions, such as silver, gold, and copper platinum ion is also positively charged. Based on the chemical characteristics, the surface of either Gram-positive and Gram-negative bacteria is negatively charged Meanwhile, similar surface characteristics could be found in fungi and enveloped virus. The positively charged platinum ions would be attracted by the negatively charged cell surface through electrostatic interaction and involved in electron transfer. With the destabilization of cell membrane, change in membrane potential, pH and local conductivity, the permeability of the membrane would be significantly increased, leading to the rupture of microbe or virus outer membrane layer. Furthermore, some functional group of proteins might bind to metal ion that would cause protein denaturation. Eventually cell death or disruption of virus structure would be triggered. Apart from the structural damage of membrane, metal ions also contribute to the generation of reactive oxygen species (ROS) inside the cell. ROS would oxidize glutathione, which is vital compound in bacteria carry out antioxidant defense system to combat against ROS. Consequently, the cell would be destructed due to the reduction of intracellular ATP level, cellular enzyme denaturation, interruption of protein synthesis and DNA damage contributed by the oxidative stress or direct interaction with the metal ion. Since the interaction of metal ion with some atoms, such as nitrogen, oxygen and sulphur, which are abundant in most cellular biomolecules, is very strong and non-specific, therefore, metal ion could possess a broad spectrum of antimicrobial property.

== Safety ==
Regarding safety concern, platinum cannot be absorbed by the body. Platinum has widely been used in numerous kinds of medical implants, such as dental alloys, aneurysm coils, medical device electrodes, coronary stents and catheters. Allergy of platinum metal in human has rarely been reported. Only platinum compounds which possess labile leaving groups coordinated to platinum, such as complex halogenated platinum salts or cisplatin, show hypersensitivity and/or toxicity to human. Since the chelated platinum ion is tightly bound to the chelating agent in the form of macromolecule, therefore, toxicity problem would not be an issue.
