= Group 10 element =

Group of chemical elements

Group 10 in the periodic table
Hydrogen																															Helium
Lithium	Beryllium																									Boron	Carbon	Nitrogen	Oxygen	Fluorine	Neon
Sodium	Magnesium																									Aluminium	Silicon	Phosphorus	Sulfur	Chlorine	Argon
Potassium	Calcium															Scandium	Titanium	Vanadium	Chromium	Manganese	Iron	Cobalt	Nickel	Copper	Zinc	Gallium	Germanium	Arsenic	Selenium	Bromine	Krypton
Rubidium	Strontium															Yttrium	Zirconium	Niobium	Molybdenum	Technetium	Ruthenium	Rhodium	Palladium	Silver	Cadmium	Indium	Tin	Antimony	Tellurium	Iodine	Xenon
Caesium	Barium	Lanthanum	Cerium	Praseodymium	Neodymium	Promethium	Samarium	Europium	Gadolinium	Terbium	Dysprosium	Holmium	Erbium	Thulium	Ytterbium	Lutetium	Hafnium	Tantalum	Tungsten	Rhenium	Osmium	Iridium	Platinum	Gold	Mercury (element)	Thallium	Lead	Bismuth	Polonium	Astatine	Radon
Francium	Radium	Actinium	Thorium	Protactinium	Uranium	Neptunium	Plutonium	Americium	Curium	Berkelium	Californium	Einsteinium	Fermium	Mendelevium	Nobelium	Lawrencium	Rutherfordium	Dubnium	Seaborgium	Bohrium	Hassium	Meitnerium	Darmstadtium	Roentgenium	Copernicium	Nihonium	Flerovium	Moscovium	Livermorium	Tennessine	Oganesson
group 9 ← → group 11
IUPAC group number	10
Name by element	nickel group
CAS group number (US, pattern A-B-A)	part of VIIIB
old IUPAC number (Europe, pattern A-B)	part of VIII

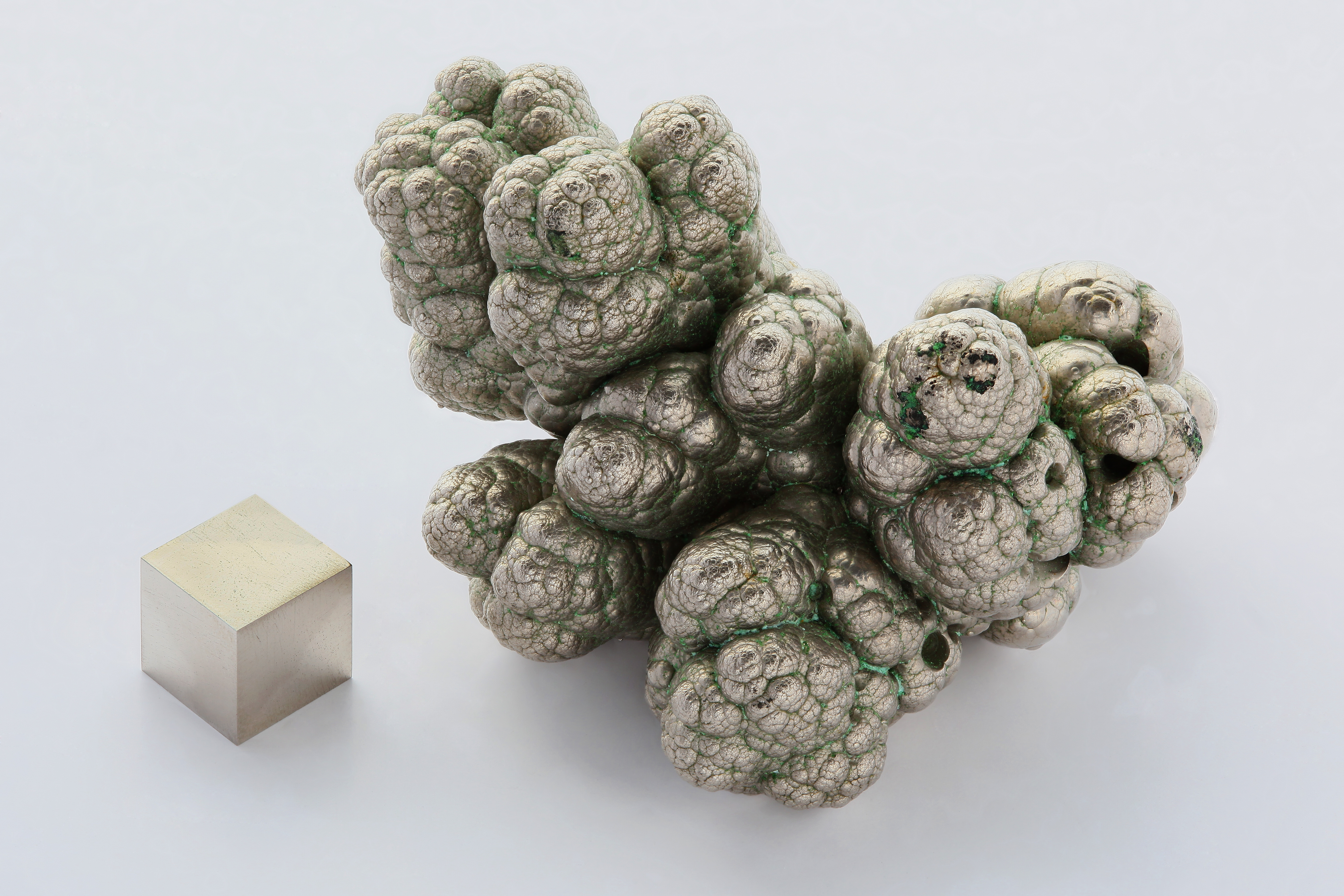
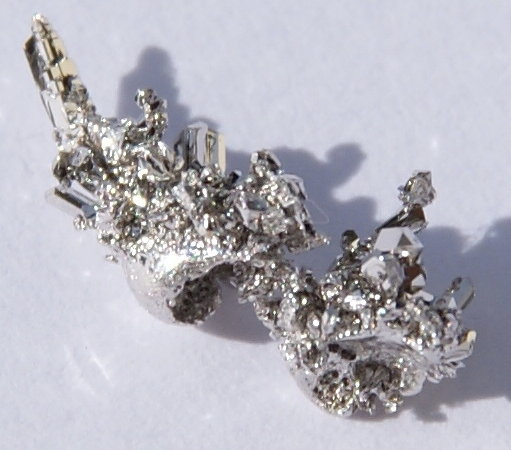
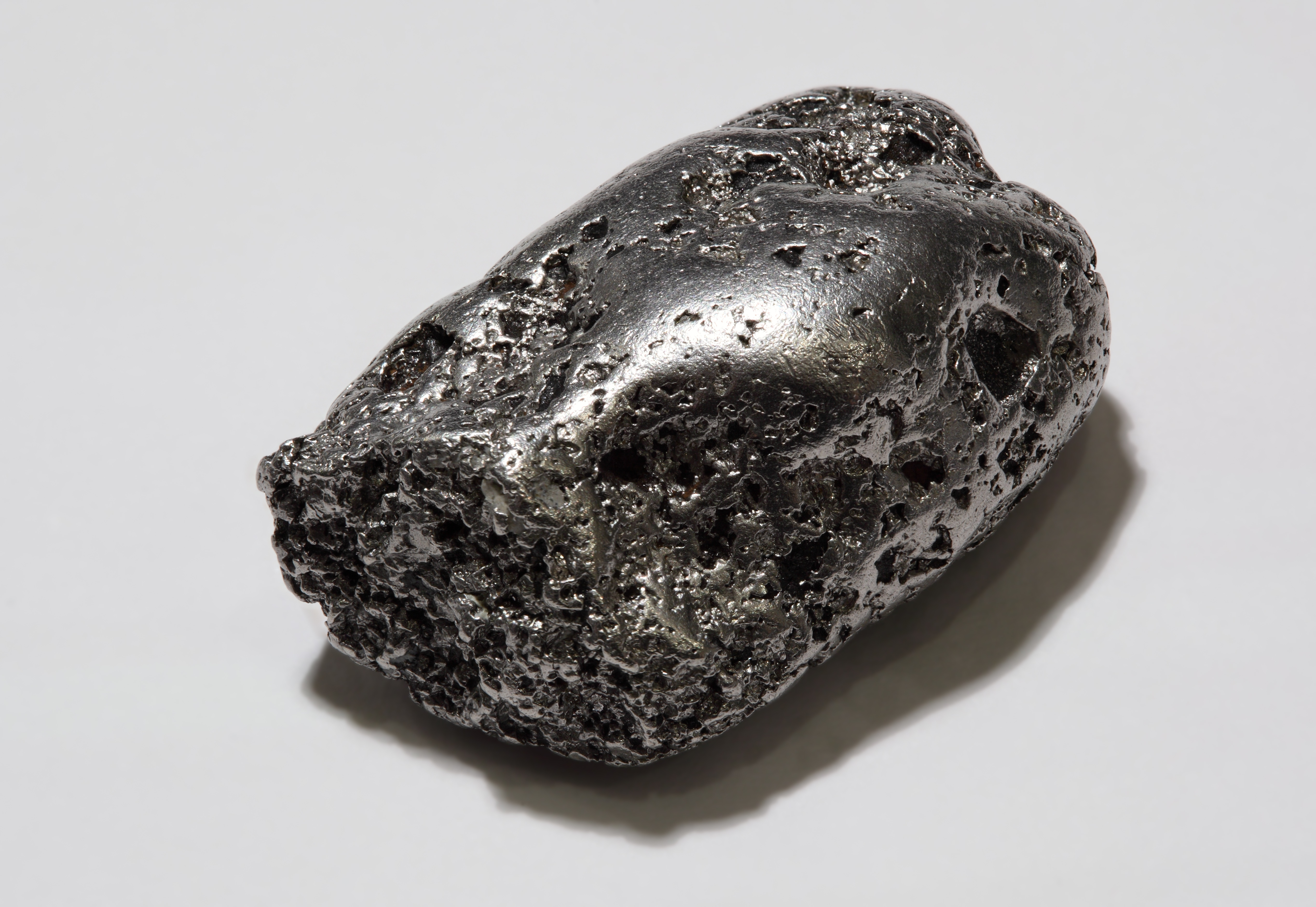
↓ Period
4	Nickel (Ni); 28 Transition metal
5	Palladium (Pd); 46 Transition metal
6	Platinum (Pt); 78 Transition metal
7	Darmstadtium (Ds); 110 unknown chemical properties
Legend primordial element synthetic element

Group 10, numbered by current IUPAC style, is the group of chemical elements in the periodic table that consists of nickel (Ni), palladium (Pd), platinum (Pt), and darmstadtium (Ds). All are d-block transition metals. All known isotopes of darmstadtium are radioactive with short half-lives, and are not known to occur in nature; only minute quantities have been synthesized in laboratories.

== Similarities ==
=== Chemical properties ===
Z	Element	Electrons per shell	Electronic configuration
28	nickel	2, 8, 16, 2	[Ar] 3d^{8} 4s^{2}
46	palladium	2, 8, 18, 18	[Kr] 4d^{10}
78	platinum	2, 8, 18, 32, 17, 1	[Xe] 4f^{14} 5d^{9} 6s^{1}
110	darmstadtium	2, 8, 18, 32, 32, 16, 2 (predicted)	[Rn] 5f^{14} 6d^{8} 7s^{2} (predicted)

The ground state electronic configurations of palladium and platinum are exceptions to Madelung's rule. According to Madelung's rule, the electronic configuration of palladium and platinum are expected to be [Kr] 5s^{2} 4d^{8} and [Xe] 4f^{14} 5d^{8} 6s^{2} respectively. However, the 5s orbital of palladium is empty, and the 6s orbital of platinum is only partially filled. The relativistic stabilization of the 7s orbital is the explanation to the predicted electron configuration of darmstadtium, which, unusually for this group, conforms to that predicted by the Aufbau principle. In general, the ground state electronic configurations of heavier atoms and transition metals are more difficult to predict.

Group 10 elements are observed in oxidation states of +1 to +4. The +2 oxidation state is common for nickel and palladium, while +2 and +4 are common for platinum. Oxidation states of −2 and −1 have also been observed for nickel and platinum, and an oxidation state of +5 has been observed for palladium and platinum. Platinum has also been observed in the oxidation states −3 and +6. Theory suggests that platinum may produce a +10 oxidation state under specific conditions, but this remains to be shown empirically.

=== Physical properties ===
Physical properties of the group 10 elements
Z	Element	Physical form	Molecular weight	Density (g/cm^{3})	Melting point (°C)	Boiling point (°C)	Heat capacity/C_{p}(c) (J mol^{−1} K^{−1})	Electron affinity (eV)	Ionization energy (eV)
28	nickel	white metal; cubic	58.693	8.90	1455	2913	26.1	1.156	7.6399
46	palladium	silver-white metal; cubic	106.42	12.0	1554.8	2963	26.0	0.562	8.3369
78	platinum	silver-gray metal; cubic	195.048	21.5	1768.2	3825	25.9	2.128	8.9588

Darmstadtium has not been isolated in pure form, and its properties have not been conclusively observed; only nickel, palladium, and platinum have had their properties experimentally confirmed. Nickel, platinum, and palladium are typically silvery-white transition metals, and can also be readily obtained in powdered form. They are hard, have a high luster, and are highly ductile. Group 10 elements are resistant to tarnish (oxidation) at STP, are refractory, and have high melting and boiling points.

== Occurrence and production ==
Nickel occurs naturally in ores, and it is the earth's 22nd most abundant element. Two prominent groups of ores from which it can be extracted are laterites and sulfide ores. Indonesia holds the world's largest nickel reserve, and is also its largest producer.

== History ==
=== Discoveries of the elements ===
==== Nickel ====
The use of nickel, often mistaken for copper, dates as far back as 3500 BCE. Nickel has been discovered in a dagger dating to 3100 BCE, in Egyptian iron beads, a bronze reamer found in Syria dating to 3500–3100 BCE, as copper-nickel alloys in coins minted in Bactria, in weapons and pots near the Senegal river, and as agricultural tools used by Mexicans in the 1700s. There is evidence to suggest that the use of nickel in antiquity came from meteoric iron, such as in the Sumerian name for iron an-bar ("fire from heaven") or in Hittite texts that describe iron's heavenly origins. Nickel was not formally named as an element until A. F. Cronstedt isolated the impure metal from "kupfernickel" (Old Nick's copper) in 1751. In 1804, J. B. Richter determined the physical properties of nickel using a purer sample, describing the metal as ductile and strong with a high melting point. The strength of nickel-steel alloys were described in 1889 and since then, nickel steels saw extensive use first for military applications and then in the development of corrosion- and heat-resistant alloys during the 20th century.

==== Palladium ====
Palladium was isolated by William Hyde Wollaston in 1803 while he was working on refining platinum metals. Palladium was in a residue left behind after platinum was precipitated out of a solution of hydrochloric acid and nitric acid as (NH_{4})PtCl_{6}. Wollaston named it after the recently discovered asteroid 2 Pallas and anonymously sold small samples of the metal to a shop, which advertised it as a "new noble metal" called "Palladium, or New Silver". This raised doubts about its purity, source, and the identity of its discoverer, causing controversy. He eventually identified himself and read his paper on the discovery of palladium to the Royal Society in 1805.

==== Platinum ====
Prior to its formal discovery, platinum was used in jewelry by native Ecuadorians of the province of Esmeraldas. The metal was found in small grains mixed with gold in river deposits, which the workers sintered with gold to form small trinkets such as rings. The first published report of platinum was written by Antonio de Ulloa, a Spanish mathematician, astronomer, and naval officer who observed "platina" (little silver) in the gold mines of Ecuador during a French expedition in 1736. Miners found the "platina" difficult to separate from gold, leading to the abandonment of those mines. Charles Wood (ironmaster) brought samples of the metal to England in 1741 and investigated its properties, observing its high melting point and its presence as small white grains in black metallic sand. Interest in the metal grew after Wood's findings were reported to the Royal Society. Henrik Teofilus Scheffer, a Swedish scientist, referred to the precious metal as "white gold" and the "seventh metal" in 1751, reporting its high durability, high density, and that it melted easily when mixed with copper or arsenic. Both Pierre-François Chabaneau (during the 1780s) and William Hyde Wollaston (during the 1800s) developed a powder metallurgy technique to produce malleable platinum, but kept their process a secret. However, their platinum ingots were brittle and tended to crack easily, likely due to impurities. In the 1800s, furnaces capable of sustaining high temperatures were invented, which eventually replaced powder metallurgy and introduced melted platinum to the market.

== Applications ==
The group 10 metals share several uses. These include:

- Decorative purposes, in the form of jewelry and electroplating.
- Catalysts in a variety of chemical reactions.
- Metal alloys.
- Electrical components, due to their predictable changes in electrical resistivity with regard to temperature.
- Superconductors, as components in alloys with other metals.

== Biological role and toxicity ==
Platinum complexes are commonly used in chemotherapy as anticancer drugs due to their antitumor activity. Palladium complexes also show marginal antitumor activity, yet its poor activity is labile compared to platinum complexes.

== See also ==
- Platinum group
