= Sodium hexachloroplatinate =

- Structure of sodium hexachloroplatinate(IV)

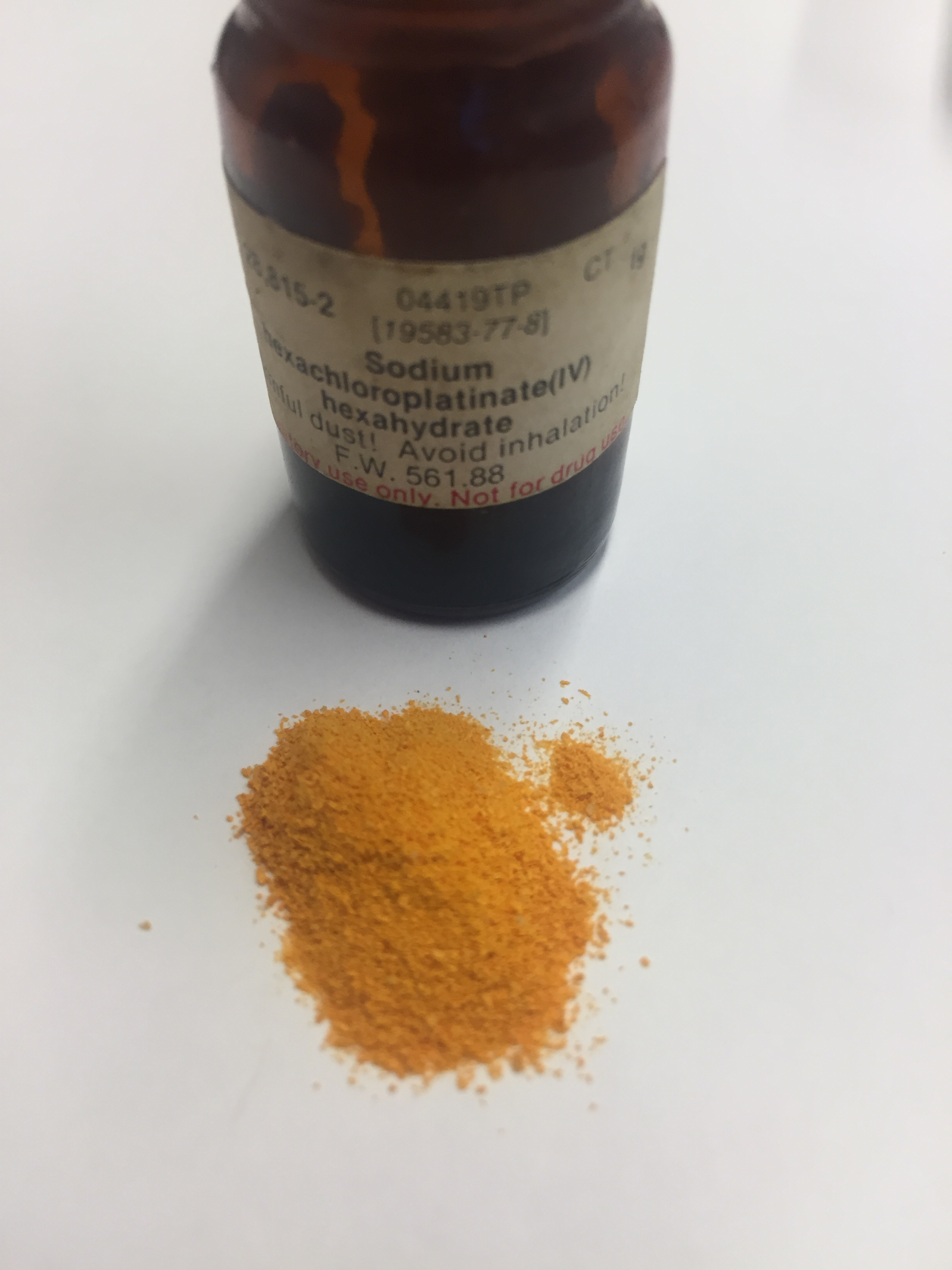
- Sample of sodium hexachloroplatinate(IV)

Names
- Other names Sodium chloroplatinate Disodium platinum hexachloride

Identifiers
CAS Number	16923-58-3
3D model (JSmol)	Interactive image
ChemSpider	9309311
ECHA InfoCard	100.037.242
EC Number	240-983-5
PubChem CID	11134193
UNII	Q7589P090H
CompTox Dashboard (EPA)	DTXSID00893459
- InChI: Key: QGFSULIVEYGQQY-UHFFFAOYSA-H; InChI=1S/6ClH.2Na.Pt/h6*1H;;;/q;;;;;;2*+1;+4/p-6
- SMILES: [Na+].[Na+].Cl[Pt-2](Cl)(Cl)(Cl)(Cl)Cl

Properties
Chemical formula	Na_{2}PtCl_{6}
Molar mass	453.7742 g/mol (anhydrous); 561.86588 g/mol (hexahydrate)
Appearance	Orange crystalline solid
Density	2.5 g/cm^{3}
Melting point	110 °C (230 °F; 383 K)
Solubility in water	Soluble

Hazards
- GHS labelling
Pictograms	(GHS05: Corrosive) (GHS06: Toxic) (GHS09: Environmental hazard)
Signal word	Warning
Hazard statements	H301, H317, H318, H334
Precautionary statements	P233, P260, P264, P264+P265, P270, P271, P272, P280, P284, P301+P316, P302+P352, P304+P340, P305+P354+P338, P317, P321, P330, P333+P317, P342+P316, P362+P364, P403, P405, P501

Related compounds
Other anions	Sodium hexafluorophosphate Sodium hexafluoroaluminate
Other cations	Potassium hexachloroplatinate Ammonium hexachloroplatinate
- Except where otherwise noted, data are given for materials in their standard state (at 25 °C [77 °F], 100 kPa). verify (what is ?) Infobox references

Sodium hexachloroplatinate(IV), the sodium salt of chloroplatinic acid, is an inorganic compound with the formula Na_{2}[PtCl_{6}], consisting of the sodium cation and the hexachloroplatinate anion. As explained by Cox and Peters, anhydrous sodium hexachloroplatinate, which is yellow, tends to form the orange hexahydrate upon storage in humid air. The latter can be dehydrated upon heating at 110 °C.

The compound is utilised as the most common chemical shift reference in platinum-195 NMR spectroscopy, relative to which the shifts of other platinum species in solution are reported.

== Preparation and reactions ==
Sodium hexachloroplatinate is obtained as an intermediate in the preparation of Pt complexes, often starting with the dissolution of platinum in aqua regia, giving hexachloroplatinic acid, which is then reacted with sodium chloride and evaporated, leaving the salt behind.

Pt + 4 HNO_{3} + 6 HCl → H_{2}[PtCl_{6}] + 4 NO_{2} + 4 H_{2}O
H_{2}[PtCl_{6}] + 2 NaCl → Na_{2}[PtCl_{6}] + 2 HCl

The compound can be converted back to platinum metal via conversion to the ammonium salt followed by thermal decomposition, allowing platinum metal to be recovered from laboratory residues.

Na_{2}[PtCl_{6}] + 2 NH_{4}Cl → (NH_{4})_{2}[PtCl_{6}] + 2 NaCl
3 (NH_{4})_{2}[PtCl_{6}] → 3 Pt + 2 N_{2} + 2 NH_{4}Cl + 16 HCl

This compound also reacts with a base, such as sodium hydroxide, producing [Pt(OH)_{6}]^{−2} ion.

== Applications ==
A 1.2 M solution of sodium hexachloroplatinate in D_{2}O is the most commonly chosen reference compound for chemical shifts in ^{195}Pt NMR. The salt is chosen as it is commercially available at a lower price relative to other platinum compounds, and it possesses high solubility enabling quick acquisition of spectra.
