= Iron–platinum nanoparticle =

Nanomaterial

Iron–platinum nanoparticles (FePt NPs) are 3D superlattices composed of an approximately equal atomic ratio of Fe and Pt. Under standard conditions, FePt NPs exist in the face-centered cubic phase but can change to a chemically ordered face-centered tetragonal phase as a result of thermal annealing. Currently there are many synthetic methods such as water-in-oil microemulsion, one-step thermal synthesis with metal precursors, and exchanged-coupled assembly for making FePt NPs. An important property of FePt NPs is their superparamagnetic character below 10 nanometers. The superparamagnetism of FePt NPs has made them attractive candidates to be used as MRI/CT scanning agents and a high-density recording material.

== Properties ==
The various properties of iron-platinum nanoparticles allow them to function in multiple ways. In standard conditions, FePt NPs exist in the face-centered cubic phase with a 3 to 10 nanometer diameter. However, once heat is added the structure becomes face-centered tetragonal.

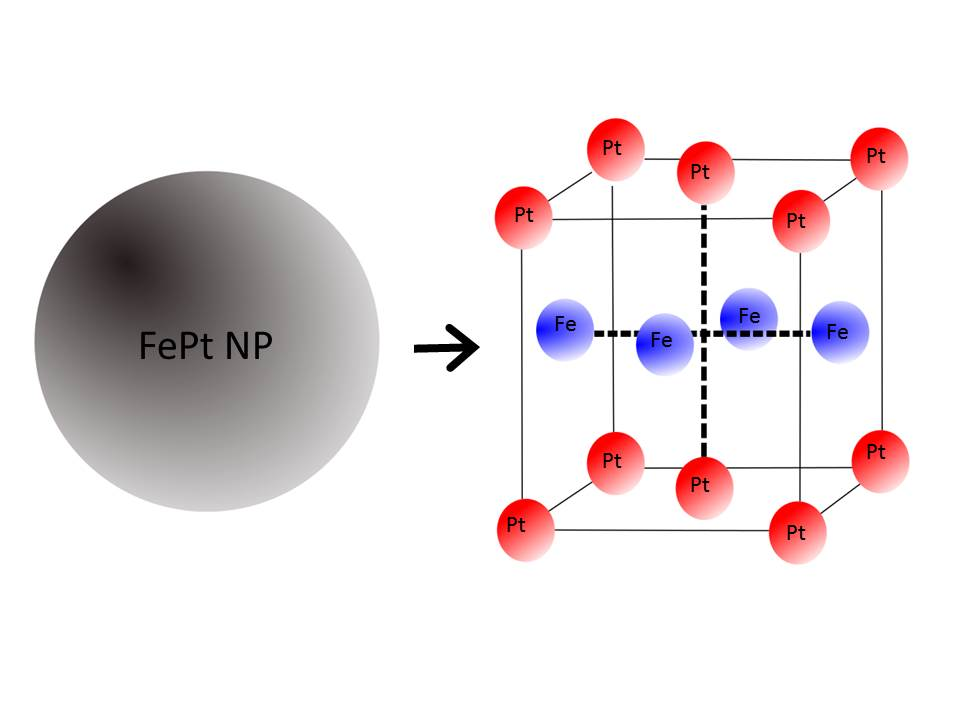
Iron-Platinum Nanoparticle Lattice in the L10 phase

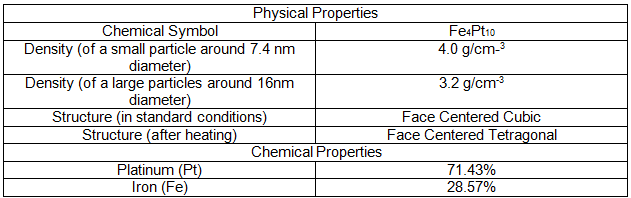
Physical properties of some FePt NPs

Plant viruses, such as Cowpea mosaic virus and Tobacco mosaic virus, enlarge the average radius of the FePt NPs through direct mineralization. The virus acts as a natural template to monodisperse nanoparticles up to 30 nanometers in diameter. The size increase of the bimetallic nanoparticles enables a wider range of biological applications.

== Synthesis ==
Platinum nanoparticles become more chemically stable when alloyed with iron, cobalt, or nickel. The platinum alloys also have a better detection range and catalytic activity than platinum alone. These magnetic metal additions to platinum reduce the overall sensitivity to oxidation while maintaining the desirable magnetic properties. Combined, FePt nanoparticles can be synthesized for medical applications. One method of synthesis uses incident laser technology to irradiate solutions containing iron and platinum to combine the two alloys. A laser beam is emitted onto a 4:1 mixture of iron (III) acetylacetonate and platinum (II) acetylacetonate dissolved in methanol. The black precipitates are then washed and dried on silicon substrates to be characterized by transmission electron microscopy (TEM) and X-ray diffraction.

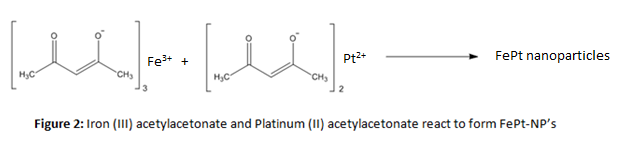
Synthesis of Iron-Platinum Nanoparticles using chloroplatinic acid

An alternative method of synthesis involves the coreduction of chloroplatinic acid (H_{2}PtCl_{6}) and iron (II) chloride in water-in-oil microemulsions. In this process, the normal face-centered cubic structure is transformed to a face-centered tetragonal configuration, offering a higher density product useful for many storage media applications.

For solid state applications FePt nanoparticles can be synthesised on a substrate by directly co-sputtering Fe and Pt.

== Applications ==
=== Magnetic storage ===
FePt NPs are promising materials for ultra-high density magnetic recording media due to their high coercivity. Higher coercivity indicates the material cannot be demagnetized easily. After annealing at 700 °C, the film can have up to 14KOe coercivity compared to common hard drives that have 5KOe coercivity. Nanoparticles have also been grown with coercivities up to 37 kOe.

=== Medicine ===
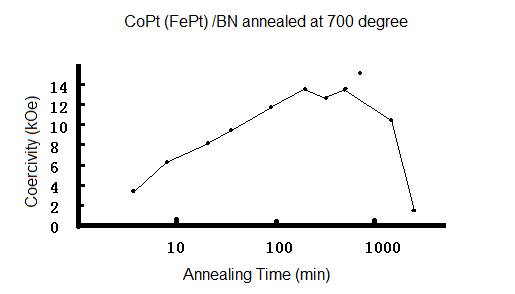
FePt Coercivity

Due to their superparamagnetism and controllable shape, size, and surface, iron-platinum nanoparticles have great potential for advancing medicine in many fields, including imaging, pathogen detection, and targeted cancer therapy. The NPs can be conjugated with antibodies for tissue-specific delivery, providing a systematic way to customize for either technology. FePt NPs are compatible for CT scans because of their strong ability to absorb x-rays. FePt NPs also provide a non-toxic, more persistent alternative to iodinated molecules that are harmful to the kidney and survive in the body for only a short time. The superparamagnetic properties of the nanoparticles and the systematic method for conjugating ligands to the FePt surface makes them viable vehicles for detection of pathogens such as gram-positive bacteria. Antibodies for the bacteria conjugated to the FePt NP bind to the bacteria and magnetic dipoles are used to detect the FePt NP-bacteria conjugate. By attaching peptides to the surface of the face-centered cubic FePt NPs, cytotoxic iron can be delivered to specific locations and taken up with high selectivity. A phospholipid coating of the FCC-FePt prevents Fe release. Once in the cell, the low pH of lysosome’s intracellular environments breaks down the phospholipid bilayer. Fe catalyzed decomposition of hydrogen peroxide into ROSs results in membrane lipid oxidation, damage to DNA and proteins, and tumor death.

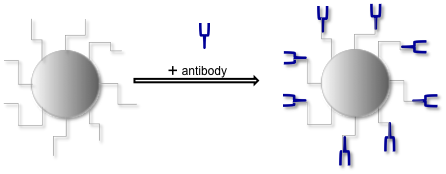
FePt-NP Antibody Application
