= Platinum-195 nuclear magnetic resonance =

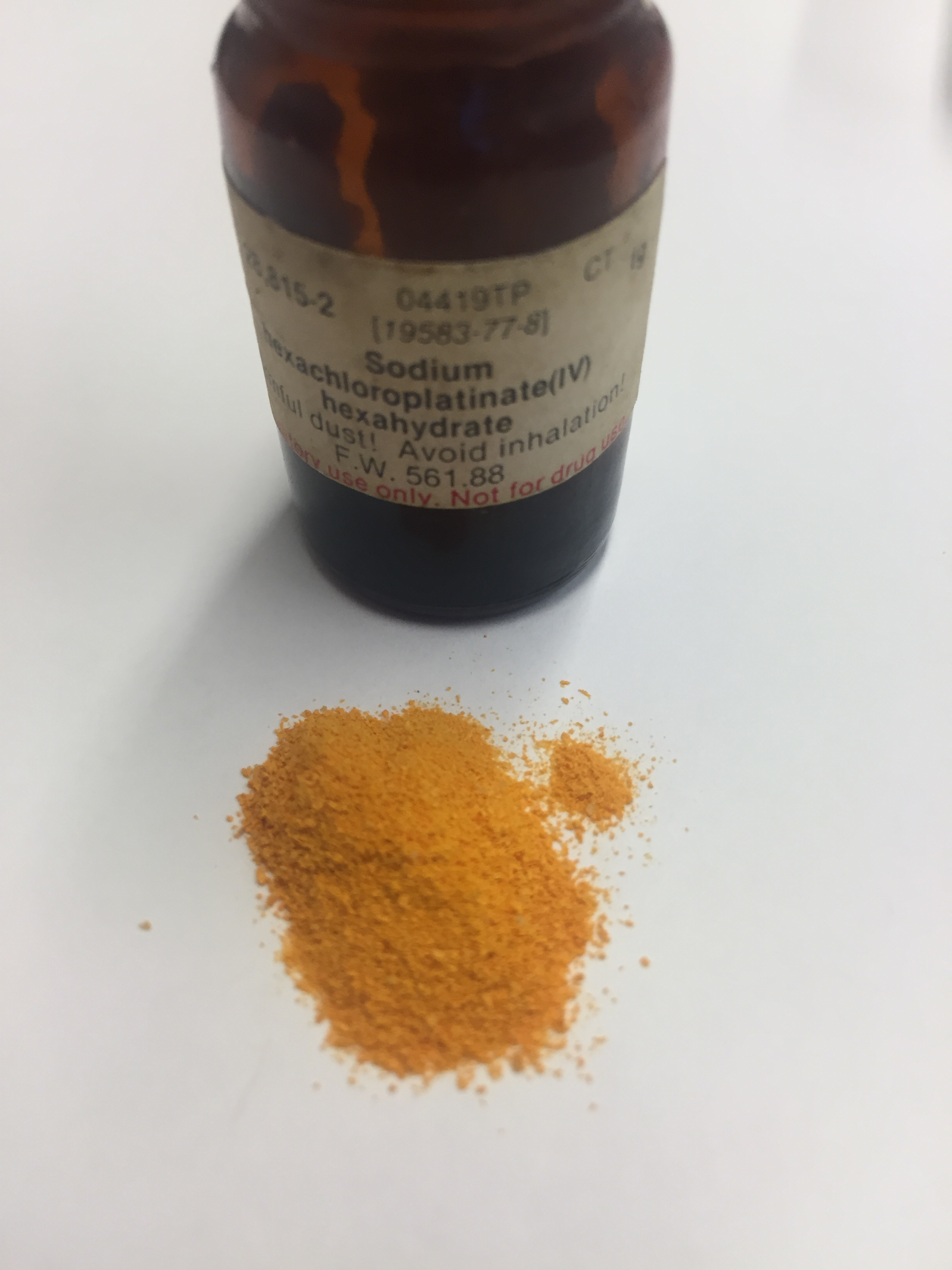
Sodium hexachloroplatinate, the usual reference compound in ^{195}Pt NMR spectroscopy.

Platinum-195 nuclear magnetic resonance spectroscopy (platinum NMR or ^{195}Pt NMR) is a spectroscopic technique which is used for the detection and characterisation of platinum compounds. The sensitivity of the technique and therefore its diagnostic utility have increased significantly starting from the 1970s, with ^{195}Pt NMR nowadays considered the method of choice for structural elucidation of Pt species in solution.

Examples of compounds routinely characterised with the method include platinum clusters and organoplatinum species such as Pt^{II}-based antitumour agents. Additional applications of ^{195}Pt NMR include kinetic and mechanistic studies or investigations on drug binding.

== ^{195}Pt magnetic properties ==
Among the naturally occurring isotopes of platinum, ^{195}Pt is the most abundant (33.8%) and the only one with non-zero spin I=1/2. The magnetic properties of the nucleus are considered favourable; the high natural abundance coupled with a medium gyromagnetic ratio (5.768×10^{7} rad T^{−1} s^{−1}) result in good ^{195}Pt NMR signal receptivity, 19 times that of ^{13}C (but still only 0.0034 times that of ^{1}H).

The resonance frequency (relative to a 100 MHz ^{1}H NMR instrument) is approximately 21.4 MHz, close to the ^{13}C resonance at 25.1 MHz.

== Chemical shifts ==
The chemical shifts of ^{195}Pt nuclei span a very large range of over 13000 ppm (cf. with ~300 ppm range for ^{13}C). The NMR signals are also very sharp and highly sensitive to the platinum chemical environment (oxidation state, ligand identity and field strength, coordination number, etc.). Therefore, substituting even very similar ligands can result in shift changes in the order of hundreds of ppm which stand out on the spectrum and are easily monitored.

The reference compound typically chosen for ^{195}Pt NMR experiments is 1.2 M sodium hexachloroplatinate(IV) (Na_{2}PtCl_{6}) in D_{2}O; this platinum(IV) complex is preferred due to its commercial availability, chemical stability, lower price relative to other platinum compounds, and high solubility which enables spectrum recording within minutes. Less soluble ionic platinum complexes have spectrum recording times of about an hour, whereas the borderline insoluble neutral complexes may require overnight measurements.

The high sensitivity of the experiment means that contributions from different chlorine isotopes in the reference compound or other species can be resolved at high magnetic field strengths, giving a ±5 ppm uncertainty in reported shift values (which is, however, negligible in view of the 13000 ppm overall range).

^{195}Pt chemical shifts for some common compounds and compound categories
Compound type	Shift range (ppm)	Pt^{II} Compound	Shift (ppm)	Pt^{IV} Compound	Shift (ppm)
Pt^{0} species	−550 to −5750	[Pt(H_{2}O)_{4}]^{2+}	+30	[PtCl_{6}]^{2−} (ref.)	0
Pt^{II} species	−900 to −5750	[PtCl_{4}]^{2−}	−1620	[Pt(OH)_{6}]^{2−}	+3280
Pt^{IV} species	+7500 to −6650	[PtCl_{2}(NH_{3})_{2}]	−2100	Satraplatin	+1200
[Pt(PPh_{3})_{2}(alkene)]	−500 to −1000	[PtBr_{4}]^{2−}	−2690	[PtBr_{6}]^{2−}	−1860
[PtX_{2}L_{2}] (X^{−}: halide; L: NR_{3}, PR_{3}, SR_{2})	−1700 to −5500	[PtCl_{3}(C_{2}H_{4})]^{−}	−2750	[Pt(CN)_{6}]^{2−}	−3870
[PtX_{2}L_{2}] (X^{−}: halide; L: NR_{3}, PR_{3}, SR_{2})	−1700 to −5500	[Pt(CN)_{4}]^{2−}	−4750		

== Couplings ==
Typical J-couplings for ^{195}Pt with other nuclei
Nucleus	^{1}J (Hz)	^{2}J (Hz)	^{3}J (Hz)	^{4}J (Hz)
^{1}H	>700	30 to 70	15 to 50	9 to 16
^{13}C	500 to 1800	10 to 55	10 to 40	12 to 15
^{15}N	150 to 350			
^{31}P	1500 to 6000			
^{119}Sn	>20000			

Coupling of ^{195}Pt to ^{1}H, ^{13}C, ^{31}P, ^{19}F or ^{15}N has been reported through one up to four bonds (^{1}J to ^{4}J) and is commonly studied to provide additional structural information for platinum complexes. The ~34% abundance of ^{195}Pt (with the remaining 66% of natural Pt being NMR-inactive) means that this coupling appears in the respective ^{1}H/^{31}P/^{15}N/^{13}C NMR spectra as satellite peaks (cf. ^{13}C satellites) which, for example, result in 17:66:17 patterns for singlets.

The trans influence in 16 e^{−} square planar Pt^{II} complexes has been studied by comparing the magnitude of coupling constants in the cis- and trans- isomers.

Complicated homonuclear couplings ranging from 60 to 9000 Hz for ^{1}J(^{195}Pt–^{195}Pt) are of interest in the context of platinum cluster compounds.
