= Bimetallic nanoparticle =

A bimetallic nanoparticle is a combination of two different metals that exhibit several new and improved properties. Bimetallic nano materials can be in the form of alloys, core-shell, or contact aggregate. Due to their novel properties, they have gained a lot of attention among the scientific and industrial communities. When used as catalysts, they show improved activity as compared to their monometallic counterparts. They are cost-effective, stable alternatives that exhibit high activity and selectivity. Hence a lot of effort has been put into the advancement of these catalysts. The combination or the type of metals present, how they are combined, and their size determines their properties.

Since two distinct metals are combined, optimizing their properties through manipulation is possible. There is a lot of flexibility in designing the bimetallic nanoparticle for specific applications. There are several techniques developed for their synthesis and accurate characterization. Improved electronic properties that arise due to bi-metallization is the most important among the novel properties. Electronic effects involve charge transfer or orbital hybridization between the constituent metals. Structural changes can result from alloy formation. The chemical and environmental parameters during their synthesis play a role in determining their structural properties. The difference in the reduction rates of the different metal precursors decides the end structural properties of the nanomaterial.

The synthesis of bimetallic nanoparticles can be done using co-reduction, successive reduction, reduction of complexes containing both the metals and electrochemical methods. Co-reduction and successive reduction methods are the most popular preparative techniques.

== Methods of synthesis ==
=== Co-reduction method ===
The co-reduction method is similar to that of the reduction method used in the synthesis of monometallic nanoparticles. The difference is that for bimetallic nanoparticle synthesis two metal precursors will be used instead of one. The two precursors along with the stabilizing agent are completely dissolved in a suitable solvent. The metals will be present in their ionic states. To convert them into their zerovalent states a reducing agent is added. The light transition metals have lower reduction potential which means that they are rarer to undergo reduction. These light transition metals when present in their zerovalent states tend to undergo oxidation very quickly and therefore are unstable. Since these metals are very important in the field of catalysis, several methods to stabilize them are sought after.

=== Successive reduction method ===
In the successive reduction method, the two precursors are added one after the other. This method generally leads to the formation of core-shell bimetallic nanoparticles. The precursor of the metal that has to form the core is added along with the stabilizing agent first. This is followed by the reducing agent. Once the complete reduction of the first metal is ensured, the second metal precursor is added. The second metal ion gets adsorbed on the nanoparticle surface and gets reduced. This results in the core-shell structure of the bimetallic nanoparticle.

Reduction of bimetallic complexes

A complex containing both the metals to be present in the bimetallic nanoparticle is taken as the precursor. The aqueous solution of these complexes in different concentrations is taken in a quartz vessel and reduced using a photoreactor. Polyvinylpyrrolidone can be used as a stabilizer. The size and composition of the nanoparticles vary with the concentration of the aqueous solution. The composition of the nanoparticles can be analyzed using EDX studies.

=== Electrochemical method ===
In chemical methods, the metal ions are reduced to their zerovalent states using a reducing agent. In the electrochemical process, bulk metal is converted into metal atoms. The size of the particle synthesized using this method can be controlled by manipulating the current density. There are two anodes made up of the constituent bulk metal and a platinum metal plate is used as the cathode. The stabilizing agent is mixed with the electrolyte. When current is passed ions of the metals are formed at the anode and are reduced by the electrons generated in the platinum electrode. The major attractions of this method are its cost-effectiveness, high yield, ease of isolation, and the ability to control the composition of metal simply through variation of current density.

== Structures of Bimetallic nanoparticles ==
=== Crown jewel structure ===
In this type of arrangement, the more expensive or catalytically important metal atom is individually arranged over the comparatively cheaper metal which is catalytically less active. The precious metal atom will be surrounded by the less expensive metal atoms. As they are present on the surface they are highly accessible for catalytic reactions. Being surrounded by the less expensive metal also alters its electronic properties, this, in turn, improves its catalytic property. As the metal atoms are fixed on the surface individually, the synthesis of crown jewel structure is difficult. It can be achieved through chemical vapor deposition (CVD). The metal is atomized using an electron beam evaporator and the whole process is carried out in an ultra-high vacuum. The metal gets diffused and deposits at different points on the less expensive metal surface. Their distribution can be determined by controlling the metal flux in a reproducible manner. Another alternative is the solution state method. Control of size and distribution is more complicated when using this method as opposed to CVD.

=== Hollow structure ===
The structures have a very high surface to volume ratios and porosity. This material is multifunctional owing to its unique structure. The void can be used to encapsulate various multifunctional nanomaterial or even as a nanoreactor. Their shells can also be functionalized. These materials are better catalysts as they are cheaper, less dense and the material is also saved. They can be synthesized by using already prepared metal nanoparticles as sacrificial templates. This takes place through a galvanic replacement reaction in which a metal nanoparticle comes in contact with a different metal of higher reduction potential gets replaced. The diffusion process and direction of the reaction can be controlled by changing the chemical environment.

=== Core-shell structure ===
As catalysis is carried out on the nanoparticle surface, the atoms at the center are wasted. This becomes more important when expensive metals are used as catalysts. To reduce the cost of the catalysts an inexpensive metal is made the core and the catalytically active metal is taken as the shell. This is achieved by first reducing the core metal followed by nucleation of the shell metal around it. The core metal also electronically modifies the shell and thereby improves catalytic activity. They can be synthesized by using a one-pot co-reduction method. Two metal precursors are added simultaneously. One of them will reduce first due to the difference in the reduction potentials of the different metal ions. This metal will form the core. The pre-formed nanoparticle acts as the seed required for the nucleation of the second metal around it. These structures can be characterized using TEM imaging. The shape and size can be manipulated by varying the different parameters. It is possible to synthesize a more complex multiwalled nanostructure, but it will require better control over the parameters.

=== Alloyed structure ===
The two different metals present are homogeneously arranged. Due to the variation in their standard reduction potentials the metals tend to nucleate separately and form heterostructures or core-shell. Synthesizing alloyed bimetallic nanoparticles require control over reaction kinetics. Using a reducing agent strong enough to reduce both the metal ions is one option. Sodium borohydride is one such reducing agent. Another option is the selection of appropriate counter ion or surfactant. The redox potentials of the metals are adjusted in such a way as to obtain simultaneous reduction through specific coordination or adsorption. The addition of a metal ion that facilitates alloy formation is the third method. A gas-phase synthesis technique is also possible in which the atoms are first brought to their atomic states. But this method will require complicated instrumentation.

== See also ==
- Iron–platinum nanoparticle
