= Hydroxyethylethylenediaminetriacetic acid =

Names
- IUPAC name N-(Carboxymethyl)-N-{2-[N-(2-hydroxyethyl)glycino]ethyl}glycine
- Systematic IUPAC name 2,2′-({2-[(2-Hydroxyethyl)(carboxymethyl)amino]ethyl}azanediyl)diacetic acid

Identifiers
CAS Number	150-39-0
3D model (JSmol)	Interactive image
ChEMBL	ChEMBL1620428
ChemSpider	8443
ECHA InfoCard	100.005.237
EC Number	205-759-3
PubChem CID	8773
UNII	R79J91U341
CompTox Dashboard (EPA)	DTXSID1059737
- InChI: InChI=1S/C10H18N2O7/c13-4-3-11(5-8(14)15)1-2-12(6-9(16)17)7-10(18)19/h13H,1-7H2,(H,14,15)(H,16,17)(H,18,19) Key: URDCARMUOSMFFI-UHFFFAOYSA-N
- SMILES: C(CN(CC(=O)O)CC(=O)O)N(CCO)CC(=O)O

Properties
Chemical formula	C_{10}H_{18}N_{2}O_{7}
Molar mass	278.261 g·mol^{−1}

Hazards
- GHS labelling
Pictograms	(GHS07: Exclamation mark)
Signal word	Warning
Hazard statements	H315, H319, H335
Precautionary statements	P261, P264, P271, P280, P302+P352, P304+P340, P305+P351+P338, P312, P321, P332+P313, P337+P313, P362, P403+P233, P405, P501
- Except where otherwise noted, data are given for materials in their standard state (at 25 °C [77 °F], 100 kPa). Infobox references

Hydroxyethylethylenediaminetriacetic acid also known as HEDTA is a tricarboxylic acid and amine. It is a hexadentate ligand. It can chelate or form salts with many metals.
