= Platinum =

Platinum, _{78}Pt
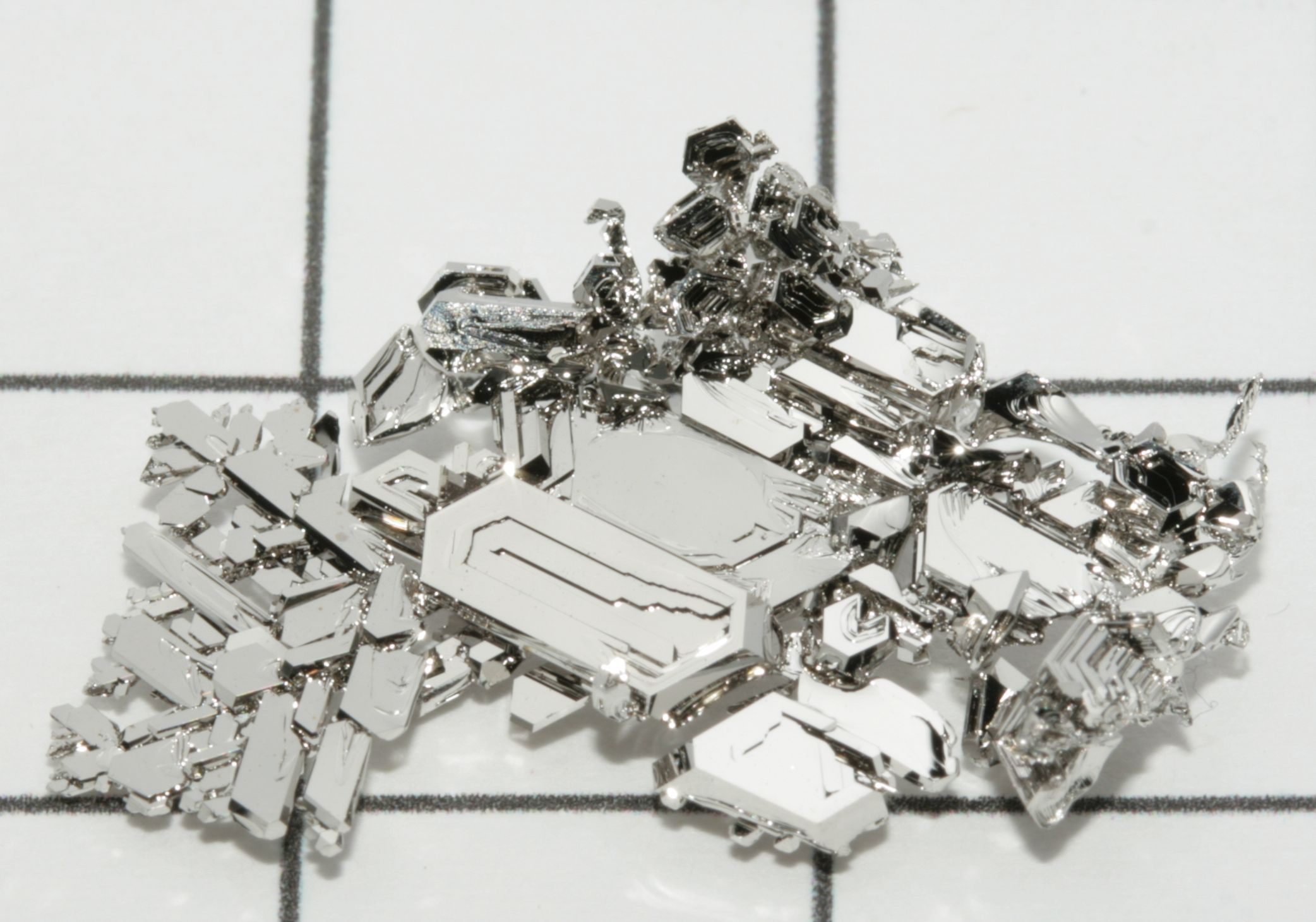

Platinum
- Pronunciation: /ˈplætənəm/ (PLAT-ən-əm)
- Appearance: silvery white

Standard atomic weight A_{r}°(Pt)
- 195.084±0.009; 195.08±0.02 (abridged)

Platinum in the periodic table
Hydrogen																															Helium
Lithium	Beryllium																									Boron	Carbon	Nitrogen	Oxygen	Fluorine	Neon
Sodium	Magnesium																									Aluminium	Silicon	Phosphorus	Sulfur	Chlorine	Argon
Potassium	Calcium															Scandium	Titanium	Vanadium	Chromium	Manganese	Iron	Cobalt	Nickel	Copper	Zinc	Gallium	Germanium	Arsenic	Selenium	Bromine	Krypton
Rubidium	Strontium															Yttrium	Zirconium	Niobium	Molybdenum	Technetium	Ruthenium	Rhodium	Palladium	Silver	Cadmium	Indium	Tin	Antimony	Tellurium	Iodine	Xenon
Caesium	Barium	Lanthanum	Cerium	Praseodymium	Neodymium	Promethium	Samarium	Europium	Gadolinium	Terbium	Dysprosium	Holmium	Erbium	Thulium	Ytterbium	Lutetium	Hafnium	Tantalum	Tungsten	Rhenium	Osmium	Iridium	Platinum	Gold	Mercury (element)	Thallium	Lead	Bismuth	Polonium	Astatine	Radon
Francium	Radium	Actinium	Thorium	Protactinium	Uranium	Neptunium	Plutonium	Americium	Curium	Berkelium	Californium	Einsteinium	Fermium	Mendelevium	Nobelium	Lawrencium	Rutherfordium	Dubnium	Seaborgium	Bohrium	Hassium	Meitnerium	Darmstadtium	Roentgenium	Copernicium	Nihonium	Flerovium	Moscovium	Livermorium	Tennessine	Oganesson
Pd
↑
Pt
↓
Ds
iridium ← platinum → gold
- Atomic number (Z): 78
- Group: group 10
- Period: period 6
- Block: d-block
- Electron configuration: [Xe] 4f^{14} 5d^{9} 6s^{1}
- Electrons per shell: 2, 8, 18, 32, 17, 1

Physical properties
- Phase at STP: solid
- Melting point: 2041.4 K (1768.3 °C, 3214.9 °F)
- Boiling point: 4098 K (3825 °C, 6917 °F)
- Density (at 20° C): 21.452 g/cm^{3}
- when liquid (at m.p.): 19.77 g/cm^{3}
- Heat of fusion: 22.17 kJ/mol
- Heat of vaporization: 510 kJ/mol
- Molar heat capacity: 25.86 J/(mol·K)
- Specific heat capacity: 132.561 J/(kg·K)
Vapor pressure
P (Pa)	1	10	100	1 k	10 k	100 k
at T (K)	2330	(2550)	2815	3143	3556	4094

Atomic properties
- Oxidation states: common: +2, +4 −3, −2, −1, 0 +1, +3, +5, +6
- Electronegativity: Pauling scale: 2.28
- Ionization energies: 1st: 870 kJ/mol; 2nd: 1791 kJ/mol
- Atomic radius: empirical: 139 pm
- Covalent radius: 136±5 pm
- Van der Waals radius: 175 pm
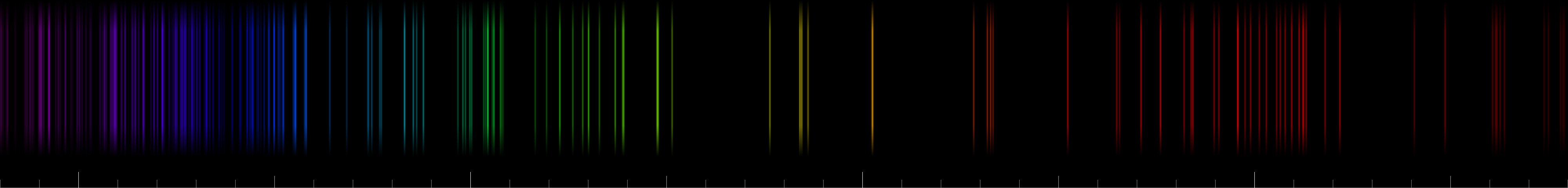
- Spectral lines of platinum

Other properties
- Natural occurrence: primordial
- Crystal structure: face-centered cubic (fcc) (cF4)
- Lattice constant: a = 392.36 pm (at 20 °C)
- Thermal expansion: 8.93×10^{−6}/K (at 20 °C)
- Thermal conductivity: 71.6 W/(m⋅K)
- Electrical resistivity: 105 nΩ⋅m (at 20 °C)
- Magnetic ordering: paramagnetic
- Molar magnetic susceptibility: +201.9 × 10^{−6} cm^{3}/mol (290 K)
- Tensile strength: 125–240 MPa
- Young's modulus: 168 GPa
- Shear modulus: 61 GPa
- Bulk modulus: 230 GPa
- Speed of sound thin rod: 2800 m/s (at r.t.)
- Poisson ratio: 0.38
- Mohs hardness: 3.5
- Vickers hardness: 400–550 MPa
- Brinell hardness: 300–500 MPa
- CAS Number: 7440-06-4

History
- Naming: from Spanish platina, diminutive of plata, "silver", for their similar appearance

Isotopes of platinum
Main isotopes			Decay	
Isotope	abundance	half-life (t_{1/2})	mode	product
^{190}Pt	0.012%	4.83×10^{11} y	α	^{186}Os
^{191}Pt	synth	2.83 d	ε	^{191}Ir
^{192}Pt	0.782%	stable		
^{193}Pt	synth	50 y	ε	^{193}Ir
^{194}Pt	32.864%	stable		
^{195}Pt	33.775%	stable		
^{196}Pt	25.211%	stable		
^{198}Pt	7.356%	stable		

Platinum is a chemical element; it has symbol Pt and atomic number 78. It is a dense, malleable, ductile, highly unreactive, precious, silverish-white transition metal. Its name originates from Spanish platina, a diminutive of plata "silver".

Platinum is a member of the platinum group of elements and group 10 of the periodic table of elements. It has six naturally occurring isotopes. It is one of the rarer elements in Earth's crust, with an average abundance of approximately 5 μg/kg. It occurs in some nickel and copper ores along with some native deposits in the form of platina ore. Because of its scarcity in Earth's crust, barely a few hundred metric tonnes are produced annually, and given its critical and important uses, it is highly valuable as well as a major precious metal commodity.

Platinum does not corrode, even at high temperatures, and is therefore considered a noble metal. Consequently, platinum is often found chemically uncombined as native platinum. Because it occurs naturally in the alluvial sands of various rivers, it was first used by pre-Columbian South American natives to produce artifacts. It was referenced in European writings as early as the 16th century, but it was not until Antonio de Ulloa published a report on a new metal of Colombian origin in 1748 that it began to be understood by scientists.

Platinum is a key component in catalytic converters, laboratory equipment, electrical contacts and electrodes, platinum resistance thermometers, dentistry equipment, and jewelry. Platinum is also used in the glass industry to manipulate molten glass, which does not "wet" platinum. Compounds containing platinum, such as cisplatin, oxaliplatin and carboplatin, are applied in chemotherapy as treatment for certain types of cancer.

== Characteristics ==
=== Physical ===
Platinum is a lustrous, ductile, and malleable silver-white metal. Platinum is more ductile than gold, silver or copper, thus being the most ductile of pure metals.

Its physical characteristics and chemical stability make it useful for industrial applications. Its resistance to wear and tarnish is well suited to use in fine jewelry.

=== Chemical ===
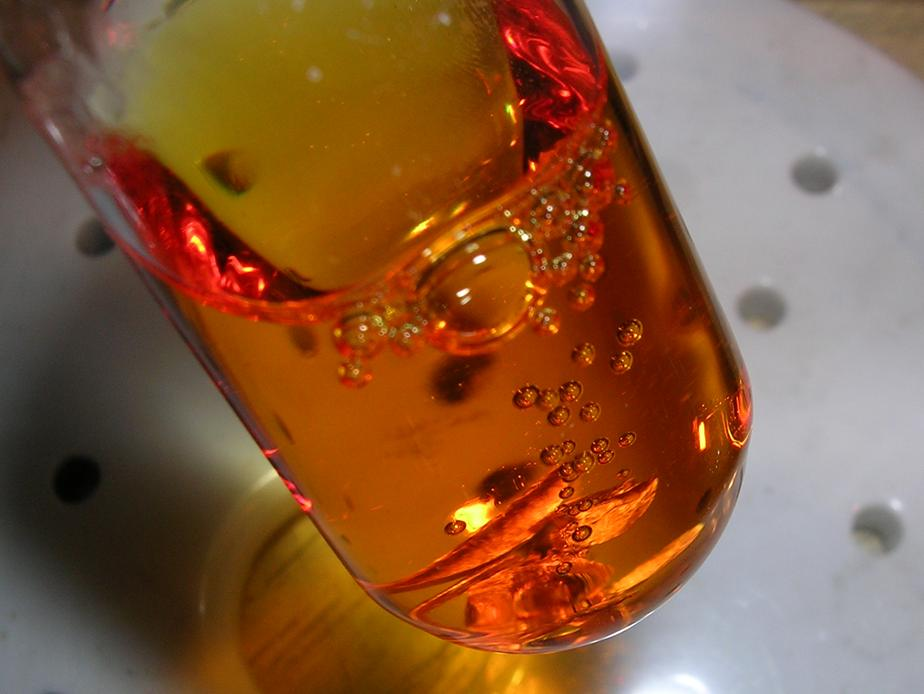
Platinum being dissolved in hot aqua regia

Platinum does not corrode, and bulk platinum does not oxidize in air at any temperature, but heated metal wires lose weight faster in air or oxygen than it does in a vacuum. The suggestion is that Pt forms a thin surface film of PtO_{2} that decomposes when heated above 500 °C.

The most common oxidation states of platinum are +2 and +4. The +1 and +3 oxidation states are less common, and are often stabilized by metal bonding in bimetallic (or polymetallic) species. Tetracoordinate platinum(II) compounds tend to adopt 16-electron square planar geometries. Although elemental platinum is generally unreactive, it is attacked by chlorine, bromine, iodine, and sulfur. It reacts vigorously with fluorine at 500 °C (932 °F) to form platinum tetrafluoride. Platinum is insoluble in hydrochloric and nitric acid, but dissolves in hot aqua regia (a mixture of nitric and hydrochloric acids), to form aqueous chloroplatinic acid, H_{2}PtCl_{6}:

Pt + 4 HNO_{3} + 6 HCl → H_{2}PtCl_{6} + 4 NO_{2} + 4 H_{2}O

As a soft acid, the Pt^{2+} ion has a great affinity for sulfide and sulfur ligands. Numerous DMSO complexes have been reported and care is taken in the choosing of reaction solvents.

In 2007, the German scientist Gerhard Ertl won the Nobel Prize in Chemistry for determining the detailed molecular mechanisms of the catalytic oxidation of carbon monoxide over platinum (catalytic converter).

=== Isotopes ===
Platinum has six naturally occurring isotopes: ^{190}Pt, ^{192}Pt, ^{194}Pt, ^{195}Pt, ^{196}Pt, and ^{198}Pt. The most abundant of these is ^{195}Pt, comprising 33.83 % of all platinum; it is the only stable isotope with a non-zero spin, of ½, and it is favorable for use in ^{195}Pt NMR. Due to its spin and large abundance, ^{195}Pt satellite peaks are also often observed in ^{1}H and ^{31}P NMR spectroscopy (e.g., for Pt-phosphine and Pt-alkyl complexes). The radioactive ^{190}Pt is the least abundant of these at only 0.012 %; it undergoes alpha decay with a half-life of 4.83×10^{11} years, causing the very low activity of 16.8 Bq/kg of natural platinum. The decay of this isotope has some use in isotope geology, though not directly for dating.

The other natural isotopes are theoretically capable of alpha decay also, but this has never been observed, and therefore they are considered stable. Platinum also has 38 synthetic isotopes ranging in atomic mass from 165 to 208, making the total number of known isotopes 44. The most stable of these radioisotopes is ^{193}Pt, with a half-life of 50 years. Most platinum isotopes decay by some combination of beta decay and (on the proton-rich side) alpha decay. ^{188}Pt, ^{191}Pt, and ^{193}Pt decay only by electron capture (besides the very small alpha branch of the first). ^{190}Pt and ^{198}Pt are predicted to have energetically favorable double beta decay paths.

=== Occurrence ===
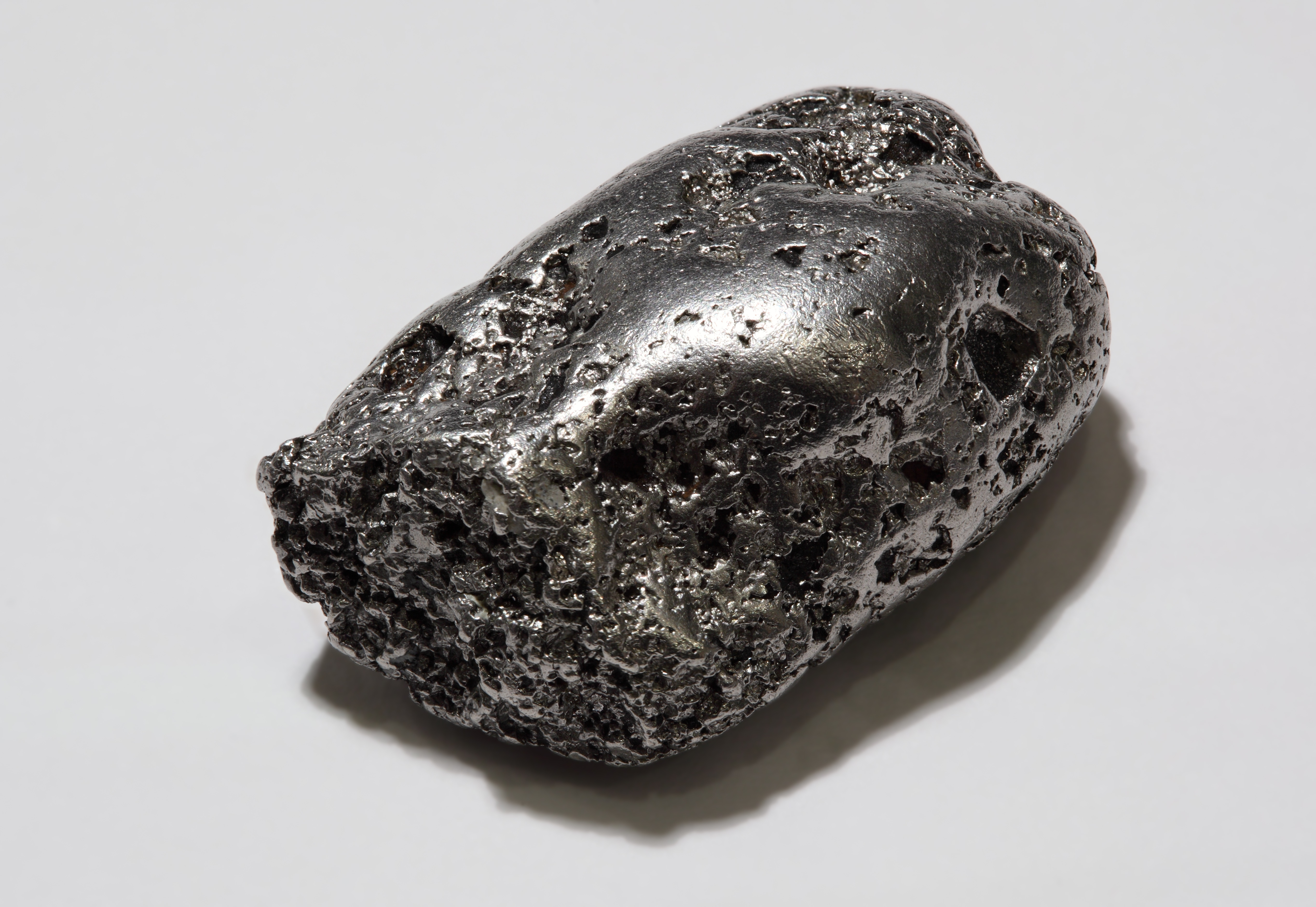
A native platinum nugget, Kondyor mine, Khabarovsk Krai

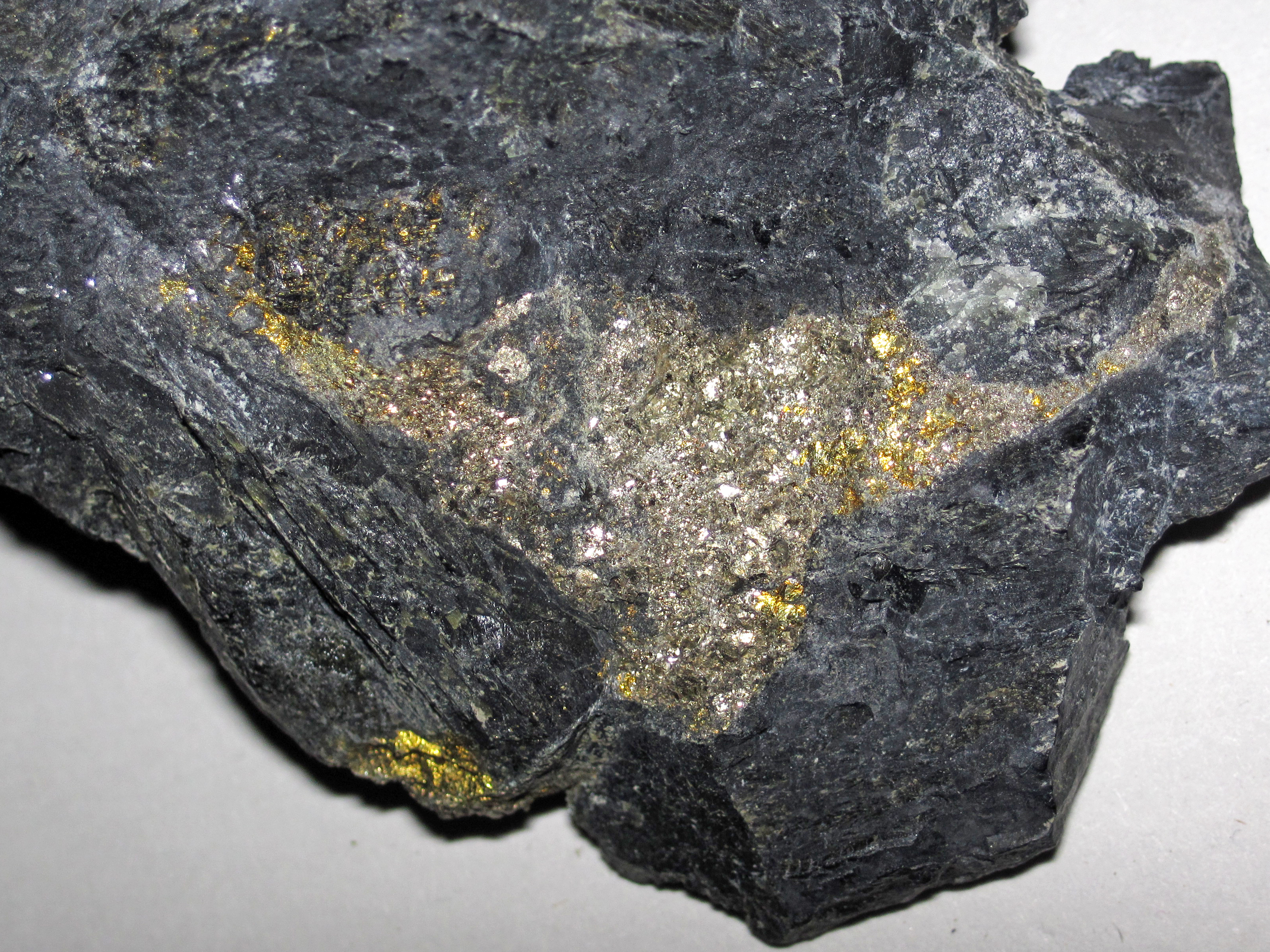
Platinum-palladium ore, Stillwater mine, Beartooth Mountains, Montana, US

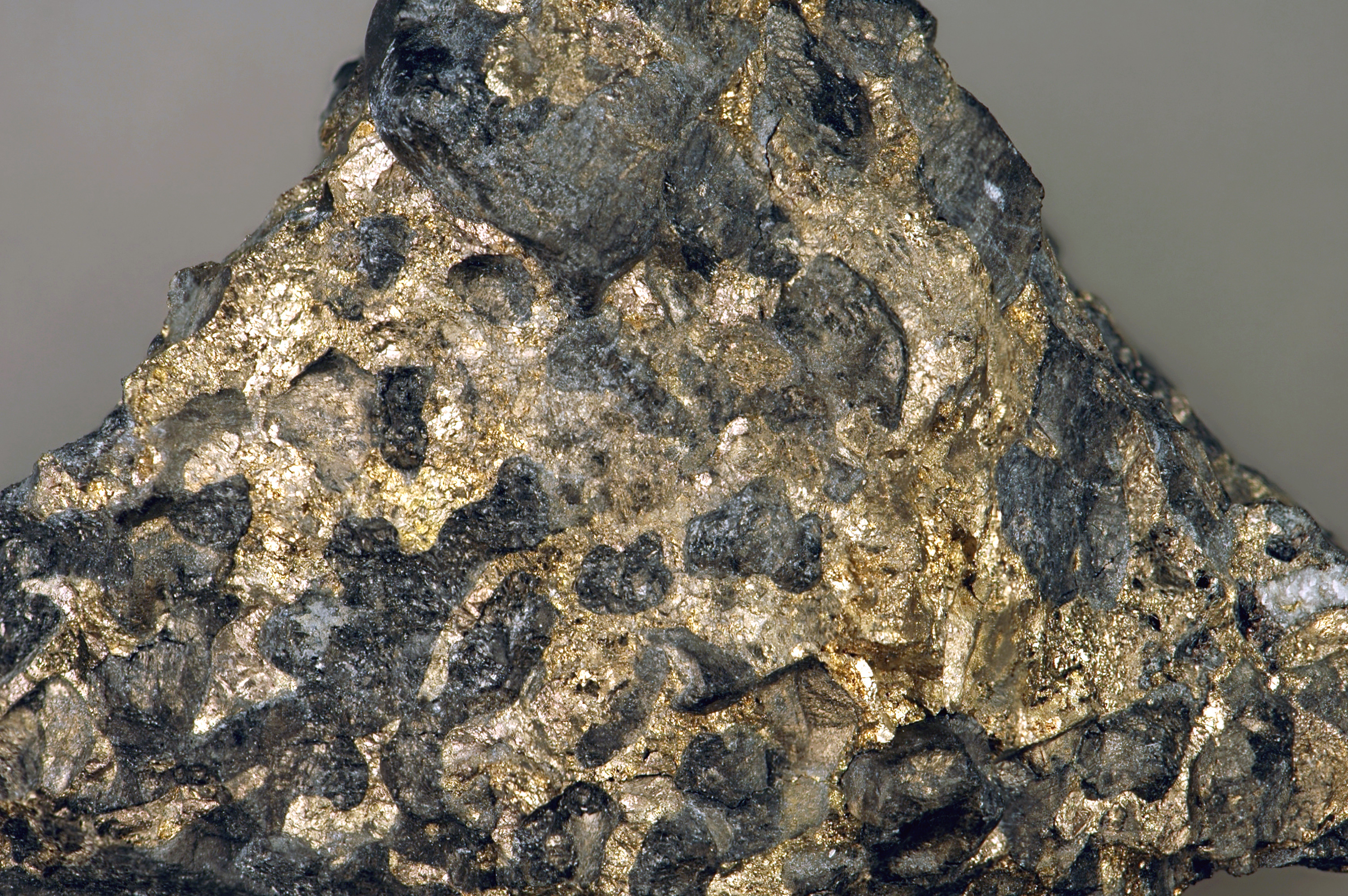
Sulfidic serpentinite (platinum-palladium ore) from Stillwater Mine, Beartooth Mountains, Montana, USA

Platinum is an extremely rare metal on Earth, occurring at a concentration of only 0.005 ppm in Earth's crust. Platinum is often found chemically uncombined as native platinum and as alloy with the other platinum-group metals mostly. Most often native platinum is found in secondary deposits among alluvial deposits. The alluvial deposits used by pre-Columbian people in the Chocó Department, Colombia are still a source for platinum-group metals. Another large alluvial deposit is in the Ural Mountains, Russia, and it is still mined.

In nickel and copper deposits, platinum-group metals occur as sulfides (e.g., (Pt,Pd)S), tellurides (e.g., PtBiTe), antimonides (PdSb), and arsenides (e.g. PtAs_{2}), and as end alloys with nickel or copper. Platinum arsenide, sperrylite (PtAs_{2}), is a major source of platinum associated with nickel ores in the Sudbury Basin deposit in Ontario, Canada. At Platinum, Alaska, about 17,000 kg (550,000 ozt) was mined between 1927 and 1975. The mine ceased operations in 1990. The rare sulfide mineral cooperite, (Pt,Pd,Ni)S, contains platinum along with palladium and nickel. Cooperite occurs in the Merensky Reef within the Bushveld complex, Gauteng, South Africa.

In 1865, chromites were identified in the Bushveld region of South Africa, followed by the discovery of platinum in 1906. In 1924, the geologist Hans Merensky discovered a large supply of platinum in the Bushveld Igneous Complex in South Africa. The specific layer he found, named the Merensky Reef, contains around 75 % of the world's known platinum. The large copper–nickel deposits near Norilsk in Russia, and the Sudbury Basin, Canada, are the two other large deposits. In the Sudbury Basin, the huge quantities of nickel ore processed make up for the fact platinum is present as only 0.5 ppm in the ore. Smaller reserves can be found in the United States, for example in the Absaroka Range in Montana. In 2025, South Africa was the top producer of platinum, with an estimated 120,000 kg, about 71 % of world mine production of 170,000 kg (370,000 lb), followed by Russia with 20,000 kg (about 12 %).

Advanced techniques to finding platinum deposits by studying ground water found some evidence of new deposits in the state of Tamil Nadu, India.

Platinum exists in somewhat higher quantity on the Moon and in meteorites. Correspondingly, platinum is found in slightly higher abundances at sites of bolide impact on Earth that are associated with resulting post-impact volcanism and can be mined economically; the Sudbury Basin is one such example.

== Compounds ==
=== Halides ===
Hexachloroplatinic acid mentioned above is probably the most important platinum compound, as it serves as the precursor for many other platinum compounds. By itself, it has various applications in photography, zinc etchings, indelible ink, plating, mirrors, porcelain coloring, and as a catalyst.

Treatment of hexachloroplatinic acid with an ammonium salt, such as ammonium chloride, gives ammonium hexachloroplatinate, which is relatively insoluble in ammonium solutions. Heating this ammonium salt in the presence of hydrogen reduces it to elemental platinum. Potassium hexachloroplatinate is similarly insoluble, and hexachloroplatinic acid has been used in the determination of potassium ions by gravimetry.

When hexachloroplatinic acid is heated, it decomposes through platinum(IV) chloride and platinum(II) chloride to elemental platinum, although the reactions do not occur stepwise:

(H_{3}O)_{2}PtCl_{6}·nH_{2}O ⇌ PtCl_{4} + 2 HCl + (n + 2) H_{2}O
PtCl_{4} ⇌ PtCl_{2} + Cl_{2}
PtCl_{2} ⇌ Pt + Cl_{2}

All three reactions are reversible. Platinum(II) and platinum(IV) bromides are known as well. Platinum hexafluoride is a strong oxidizer capable of oxidizing oxygen.

=== Oxides ===
Platinum(IV) oxide, PtO_{2}, also known as "Adams' catalyst", is a black powder that is soluble in potassium hydroxide (KOH) solutions and concentrated acids. PtO_{2} and the less common PtO both decompose upon heating. Platinum(II,IV) oxide, Pt_{3}O_{4}, is formed in the following reaction:

2 Pt^{2+} + Pt^{4+} + 4 O^{2−} → Pt_{3}O_{4}

=== Other compounds ===
Unlike palladium acetate, platinum(II) acetate is not commercially available. Where a base is desired, the halides have been used in conjunction with sodium acetate. The use of platinum(II) acetylacetonate has also been reported.

Unlike nickel but like palladium, the homoleptic carbonyl complex Pt(CO)_{4} is not stable.

Platinum exhibits negative oxidation states at surfaces reduced electrochemically, and several "platinides" have been synthesized in which platinum exhibits oxidation states ranging from −1 to −2. The negative oxidation states exhibited by platinum are unusual for metallic elements, and they are attributed to the relativistic stabilization of the 6s orbitals. Barium platinides include BaPt, Ba_{3}Pt_{2}, and Ba_{2}Pt. Caesium platinide, Cs_{2}Pt, a dark-red transparent crystalline compound has been shown to contain Pt^{2−} anions. The "platinum Grignard" Pt(MgCl)_{2}·nTHF conjecturally contains Pt^{2−} as well.

It is predicted that even the cation PtO_{4}^{2+} in which platinum exists in the +10 oxidation state may be achievable.

Zeise's salt, containing an ethylene ligand, was one of the first organometallic compounds discovered. Dichloro(cycloocta-1,5-diene)platinum(II) is a commercially available olefin complex, which contains easily displaceable cod ligands ("cod" being an abbreviation of 1,5-cyclooctadiene). The cod complex and the halides are convenient starting points to platinum chemistry.

Cisplatin, or cis-diamminedichloroplatinum(II) is the first of a series of square planar platinum(II)-containing chemotherapy drugs. Others include carboplatin and oxaliplatin. These compounds are capable of crosslinking DNA, and kill cells by similar pathways to alkylating chemotherapeutic agents. (Side effects of cisplatin include nausea and vomiting, hair loss, tinnitus, hearing loss, and nephrotoxicity.)

Organoplatinum compounds such as the above anti-tumor agents, as well as soluble inorganic platinum complexes, are routinely characterized using ^{195}Pt nuclear magnetic resonance spectroscopy.

The hexachloroplatinate ion

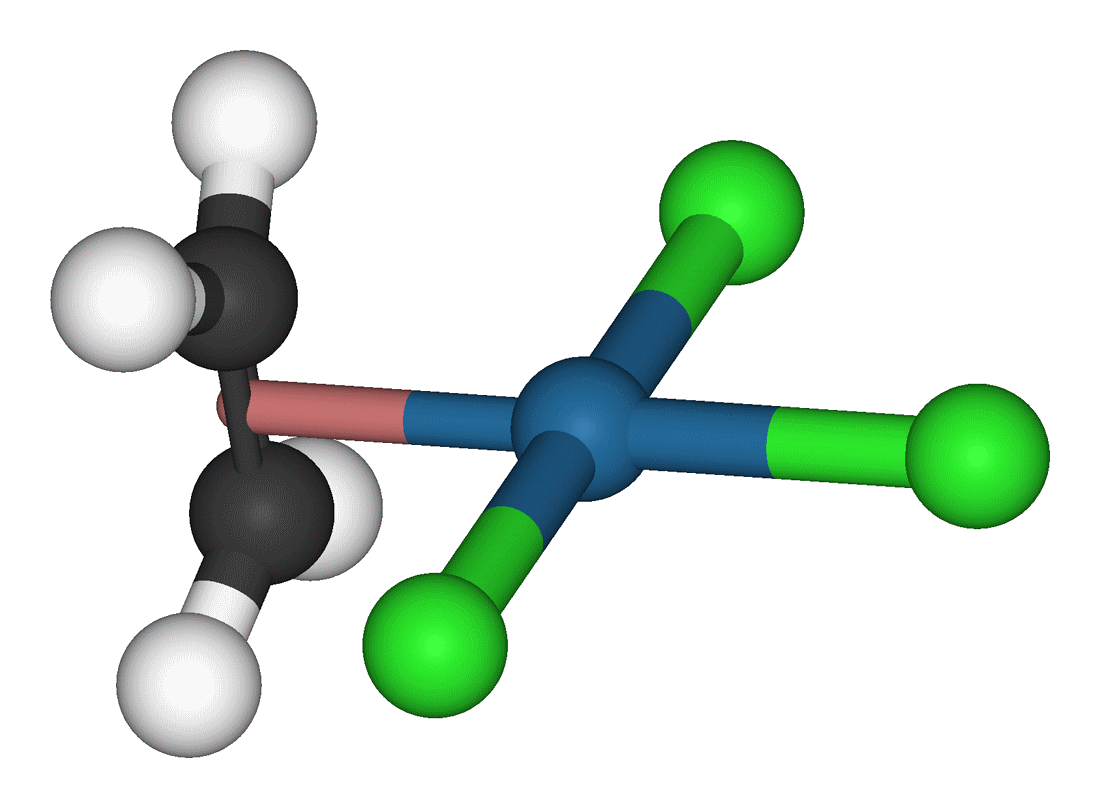
The anion of Zeise's salt

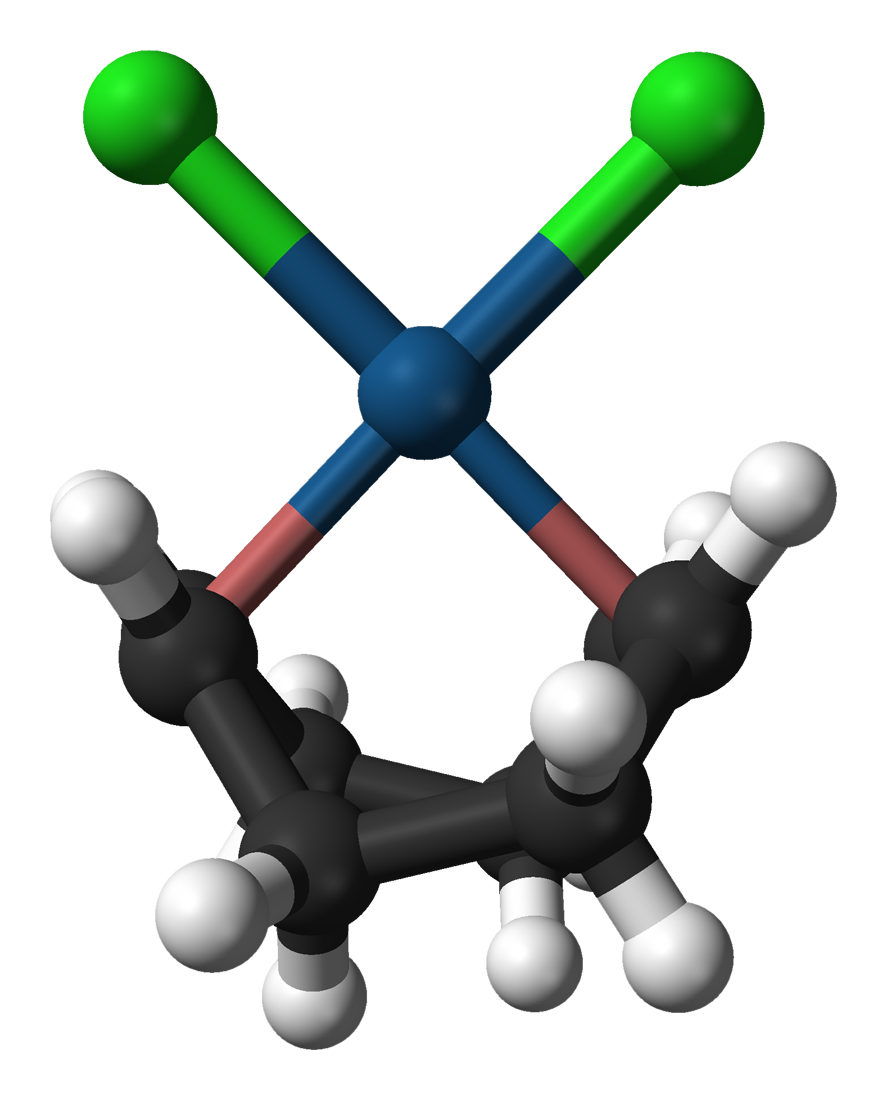
Dichloro(cycloocta-1,5-diene)platinum(II)

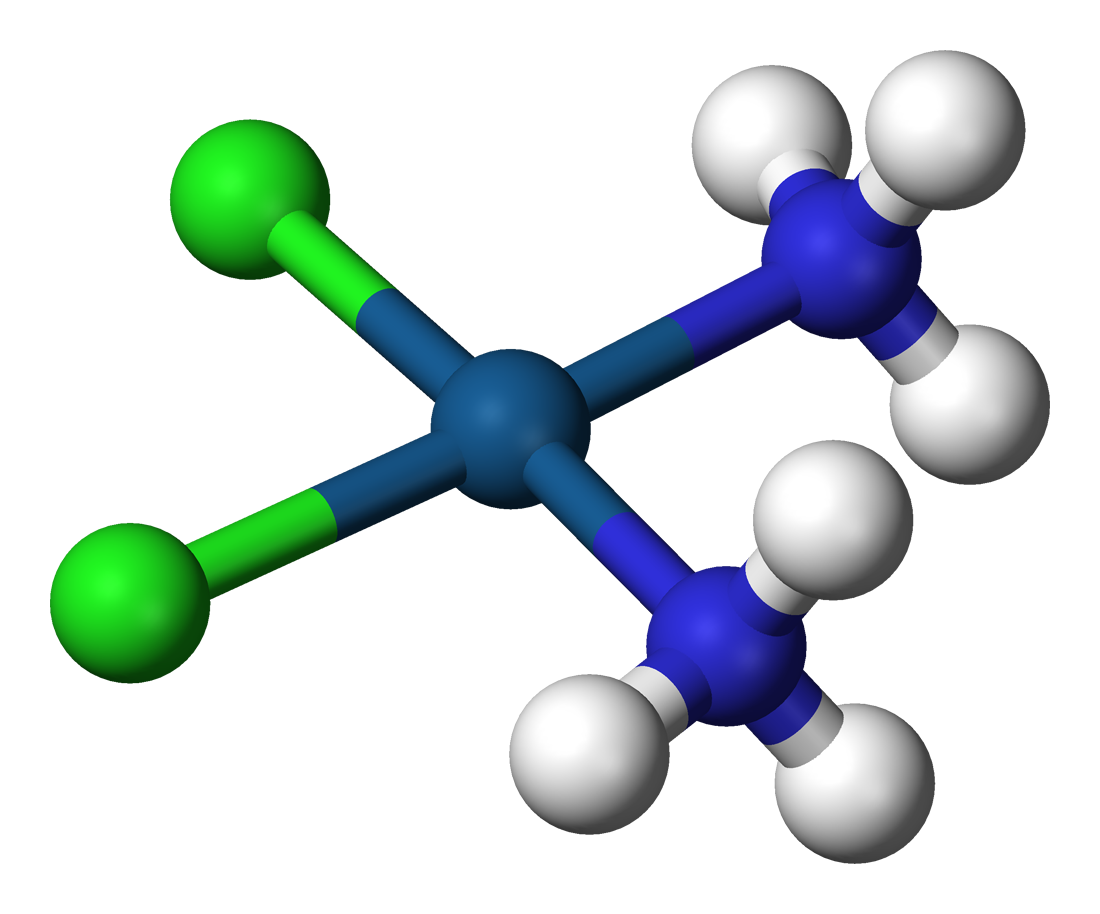
Cisplatin

=== Non-reactivity with animal life ===
Platinum exposure has shown no adverse effects with animal life as it is one of the least reactive metals.

As platinum is a catalyst in the manufacture of the silicone rubber and gel components of several types of medical implants (breast implants, joint replacement prosthetics, artificial lumbar discs, vascular access ports, etc.), the possibility that platinum could enter the body and cause adverse effects has been studied. The Food and Drug Administration and other institutions have reviewed the issue and found no evidence to suggest toxicity in vivo.

==== Platinum salts ====
Short-term exposure to platinum salts may cause irritation of the eyes, nose, and throat, and long-term exposure may cause both respiratory and skin allergies. The current OSHA standard is 2 micrograms per cubic meter of air averaged over an 8-hour work shift.

== History ==
=== Early uses ===
Archaeologists have discovered traces of platinum in the gold used in ancient Egyptian burials. For example, a small box from burial of Shepenupet II was found to be decorated with gold-platinum hieroglyphs. However, the extent of early Egyptians' knowledge of the metal is unclear. It is possible they did not recognize there was platinum in their gold.

The metal was used by Native Americans near modern-day Esmeraldas, Ecuador to produce artifacts of a white gold-platinum alloy. Archeologists usually associate the tradition of platinum-working in South America with the La Tolita Culture (c. 600 BCE – 200 CE), but precise dates and location are difficult, as most platinum artifacts from the area were bought secondhand through the antiquities trade rather than obtained by direct archeological excavation. To work the metal, they would combine gold and platinum powders by sintering. The resulting gold–platinum alloy would then be soft enough to shape with tools. The platinum used in such objects was not the pure element, but rather a naturally occurring mixture of the platinum group metals, with small amounts of palladium, rhodium, and iridium.

=== Early scientific studies ===
The first European reference to platinum appears in 1557 in the writings of the Italian humanist Julius Caesar Scaliger as a description of an unknown noble metal found between Darién and Mexico, "which no fire nor any Spanish artifice has yet been able to liquefy". From their first encounters with platinum, the Spanish generally saw the metal as a kind of impurity in gold, and it was treated as such. It was often simply thrown away, and there was an official decree forbidding the adulteration of gold with platinum impurities.

This alchemical symbol for platinum was made by joining the symbols of silver (moon) and gold (sun).

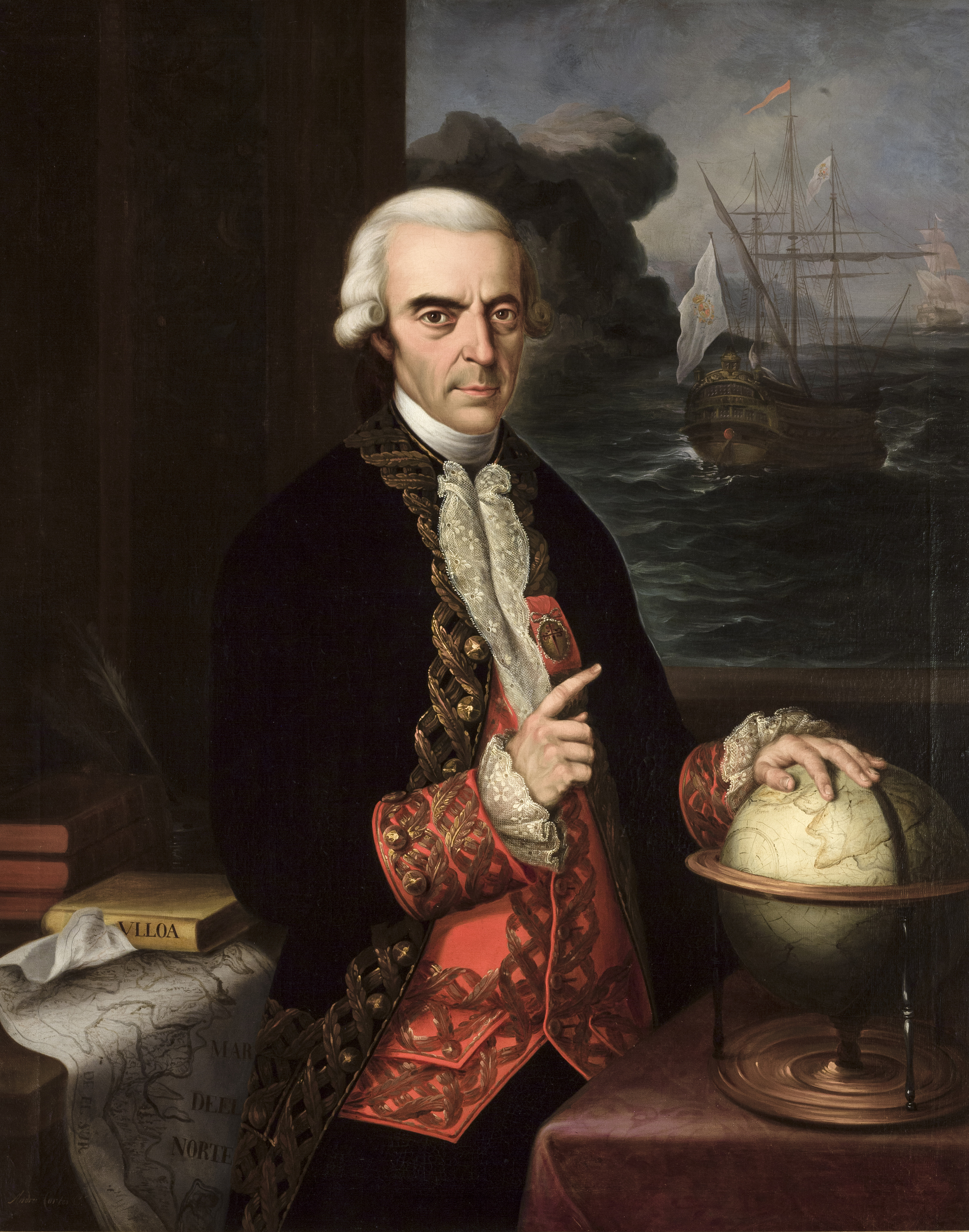
Antonio de Ulloa's report on his trip to South America described metal "platina" that interfered with the mining of gold and silver.

In 1735, Antonio de Ulloa and Jorge Juan y Santacilia saw Native Americans mining platinum while the Spaniards were travelling through Colombia and Peru for eight years. Ulloa and Juan found mines with the whitish metal nuggets and took them home to Spain. His historical account of the expedition included a description of platinum as being neither separable nor calcinable. Ulloa also anticipated the discovery of platinum mines. After publishing the report in 1748, Ulloa did not continue to investigate the new metal. In 1758, he was sent to superintend mercury mining operations in Huancavelica.

In 1741, Charles Wood, a British metallurgist, found various samples of Colombian platinum in Jamaica, which he sent to William Brownrigg for further investigation.

In 1750, after studying the platinum sent to him by Wood, Brownrigg presented a detailed account of the metal to the Royal Society, stating that he had seen no mention of it in any previous accounts of known minerals. Brownrigg also made note of platinum's extremely high melting point and refractoriness toward several metallurgical fluxes. Other chemists across Europe soon began studying platinum, including Andreas Sigismund Marggraf, Torbern Bergman, Jöns Jakob Berzelius, William Lewis, and Pierre Macquer. In 1752, Henrik Scheffer published a detailed scientific description of the metal, which he referred to as "white gold", including an account of how he succeeded in fusing platinum ore with the aid of arsenic. Scheffer described platinum as being less pliable than gold, but with similar resistance to corrosion.

=== Means of malleability ===
Karl von Sickingen researched platinum extensively in 1772. He succeeded in making malleable platinum by alloying it with gold, dissolving the alloy in hot aqua regia, precipitating the platinum with ammonium chloride, igniting the ammonium chloroplatinate, and hammering the resulting finely divided platinum to make it cohere. Franz Karl Achard made the first platinum crucible in 1784. He worked with the platinum by fusing it with arsenic, then later volatilizing the arsenic.

=== "Platinum age" in Spain ===
In 1786, Charles III of Spain provided a library and laboratory to Pierre-François Chabaneau to aid in his research of platinum. Chabaneau succeeded in removing various impurities from the ore, including gold, mercury, lead, copper, and iron. This led him to believe he was working with a single metal, but in truth the ore still contained the yet-undiscovered platinum-group metals. This led to inconsistent results in his experiments. At times, the platinum seemed malleable, but when it was alloyed with iridium, it would be much more brittle. Sometimes the metal was entirely incombustible, but when alloyed with osmium, it would volatilize. After several months, Chabaneau succeeded in producing 23 kilograms of pure, malleable platinum by hammering and compressing the sponge form while white-hot. Chabeneau realized the infusibility of platinum would lend value to objects made of it and so started a business with Joaquín Cabezas producing platinum ingots and utensils. This started what is known as the "platinum age" in Spain.

== Production ==
Platinum, along with the rest of the platinum-group metals, is obtained commercially as a by-product from nickel and copper mining and processing. During electrorefining of copper, noble metals such as silver, gold and the platinum-group metals as well as selenium and tellurium settle to the bottom of the cell as "anode mud", which forms the starting point for the extraction of the platinum-group metals.

If pure platinum is found in placer deposits or other ores, it is isolated from them by various methods of subtracting impurities. Because platinum is significantly denser than many of its impurities, the lighter impurities can be removed by simply floating them away in a liquid. Platinum is paramagnetic, whereas nickel and iron are both ferromagnetic. These two impurities are thus removed by running an electromagnet over the mixture. Because platinum has a higher melting point than most other substances, many impurities can be burned or melted away without melting the platinum. Finally, platinum is resistant to hydrochloric and sulfuric acids, whereas other substances are readily attacked by them. Metal impurities can be removed by stirring the mixture in either of the two acids and recovering the remaining platinum.

One suitable method for purification for the raw platinum, which contains platinum, gold, and the other platinum-group metals, is to process it with aqua regia, in which palladium, gold and platinum are dissolved, whereas osmium, iridium, ruthenium and rhodium stay unreacted. The gold is precipitated by the addition of iron(II) chloride and after filtering off the gold, the platinum is precipitated as ammonium chloroplatinate by the addition of ammonium chloride. Ammonium chloroplatinate can be converted to platinum by heating. Unprecipitated hexachloroplatinate(IV) may be reduced with elemental zinc, and a similar method is suitable for small scale recovery of platinum from laboratory residues. Mining and refining platinum has environmental impacts.

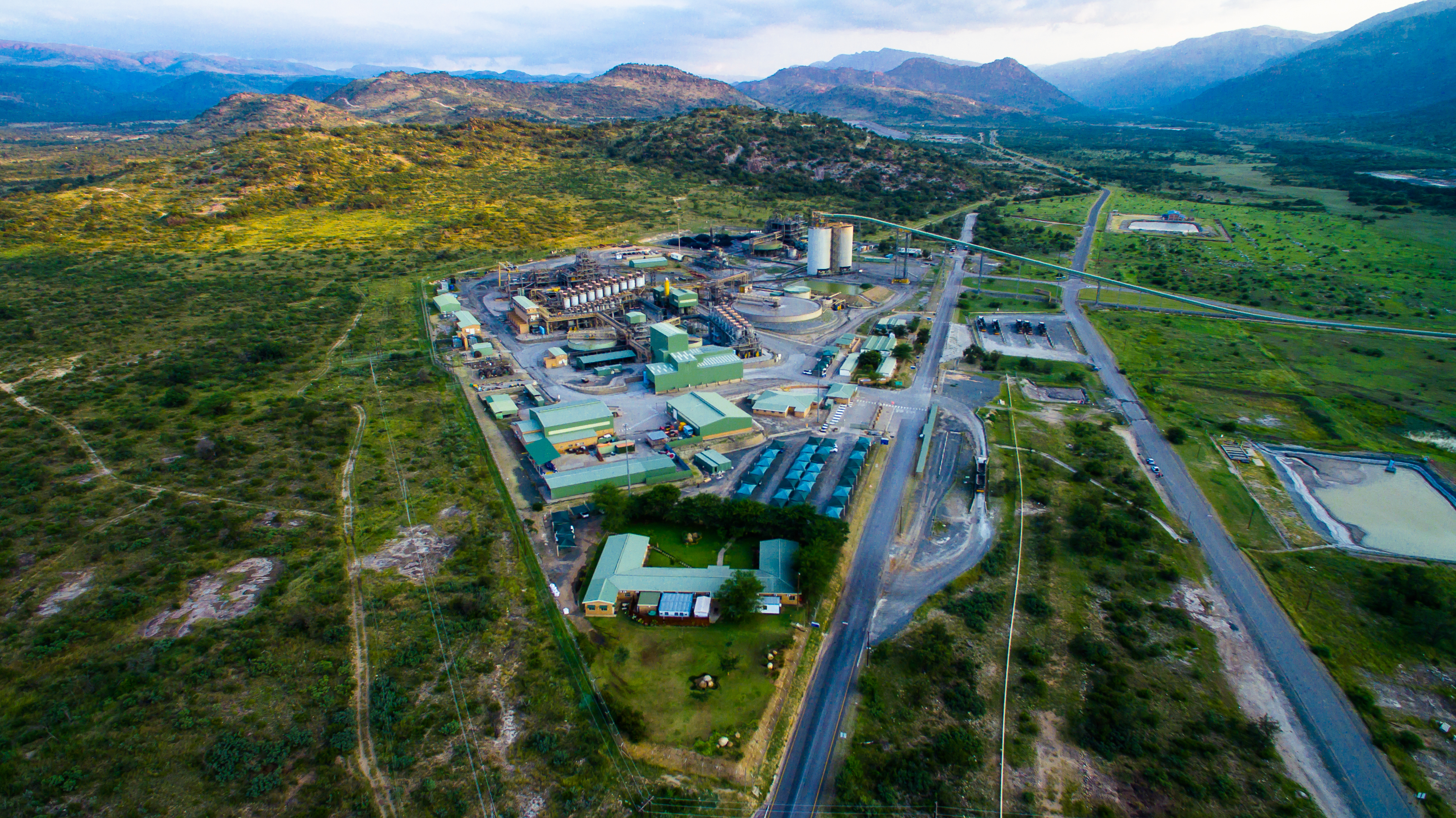
An aerial photograph of a platinum mine in South Africa.

Time trend of platinum production

Platinum production by country
Country	Production (kg)	Year
World	170,000	2024
South Africa	120,000	2024
Zimbabwe	19,000	2024
Russia	18,000	2024
Canada	5,200	2024
China	2,800	2022
United States	2,000	2024
Finland	1,243	2022
Colombia	501	2022
Australia	100	2022
Ethiopia	30	2022
Serbia	10	2022
Poland	5	2022

== Applications ==
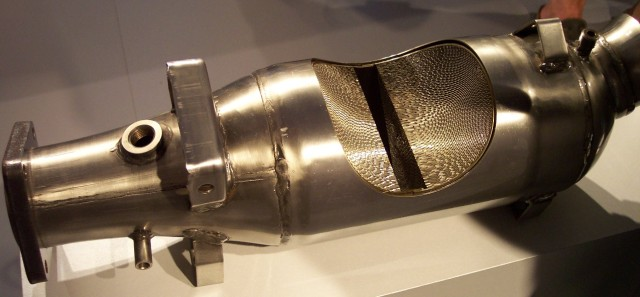
Cutaway view of a metal-core catalytic converter

Of the 218 tonnes of platinum sold in 2014, 98 tonnes were used for vehicle emissions control devices (45 %), 74.7 tonnes for jewelry (34 %), 20.0 tonnes for chemical production and petroleum refining (9.2 %), and 5.85 tonnes for electrical applications such as hard disk drives (2.7 %). The remaining 28.9 tonnes went to various other minor applications, such as medicine and biomedicine, glassmaking equipment, investment, electrodes, anticancer drugs, oxygen sensors, spark plugs and turbine engines.

=== Catalyst ===
The most common use of platinum is as a catalyst in chemical reactions, often as platinum black. It has been employed as a catalyst since the early 19th century, when platinum powder was used to catalyze the ignition of hydrogen. In an automobile catalytic converter, it completes the combustion of low concentrations of unburned hydrocarbons from the exhaust into carbon dioxide and water vapor. Platinum is also used in the petroleum industry as a catalyst in a number of separate processes, but especially in catalytic reforming of straight-run naphthas into higher-octane gasoline that becomes rich in aromatic compounds. PtO_{2}, also known as Adams' catalyst, is used as a hydrogenation catalyst, specifically for vegetable oils. Platinum also strongly catalyzes the decomposition of hydrogen peroxide into water and oxygen and it is used in fuel cells as a catalyst for the reduction of oxygen.

=== Green energy transition ===
As a fuel cell catalyst, platinum enables hydrogen and oxygen reactions to take place at an optimum rate. It is used in platinum-based proton exchange membrane (PEM) technologies required in green hydrogen production as well as fuel cell electric vehicle adoption (FCEV).

=== Standard ===
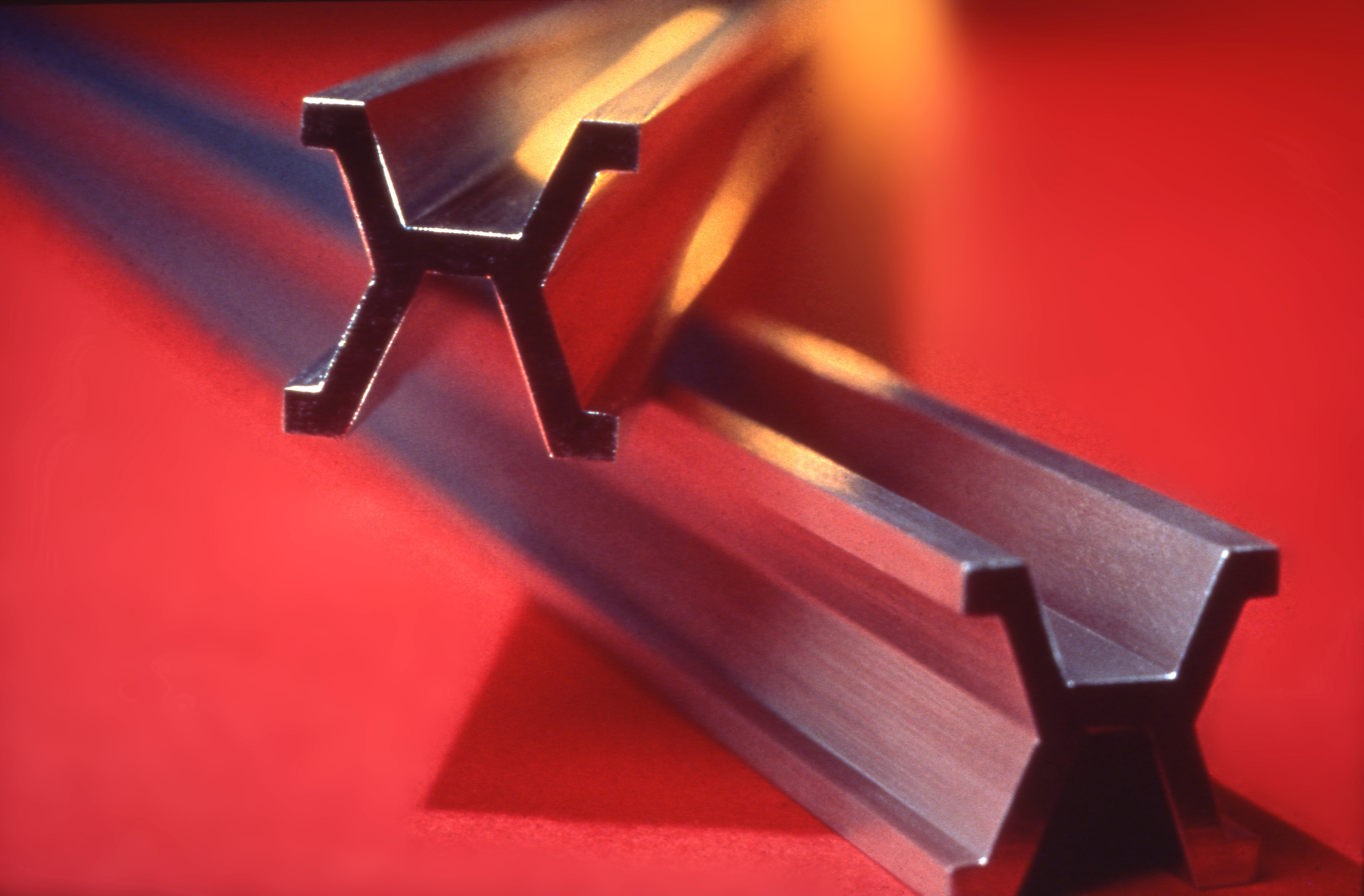
Prototype International Meter bar made by Johnson Matthey

From 1889 to 1960, the meter was defined as the length of a platinum-iridium (90:10) alloy bar, known as the international prototype meter. The previous bar was made of platinum in 1799. Until May 2019, the kilogram was defined as the mass of the international prototype of the kilogram, a cylinder of the same platinum-iridium alloy made in 1879.

The standard platinum resistance thermometer (SPRT) is one of the four types of thermometers used to define the International Temperature Scale of 1990 (ITS-90), the international calibration standard for temperature measurements. The resistance wire in the thermometer is made of pure platinum (NIST manufactured the wires from platinum bar stock with a chemical purity of 99.999 % by weight). In addition to laboratory uses, platinum resistance thermometry (PRT) also has many industrial applications, industrial standards include ASTM E1137 and IEC 60751.

The standard hydrogen electrode also uses a platinized platinum electrode due to its corrosion resistance, and other attributes.

=== As an investment ===
Platinum is a precious metal commodity; its bullion has the ISO currency code of XPT. Coins, bars, and ingots are traded or collected. Platinum finds use in jewelry, commonly sold as .999 or .9995 fine. It is used for this purpose for its prestige and inherent bullion value.

In watchmaking, Rolex, Vacheron Constantin, Patek Philippe, Breitling, and other master watchmakers use platinum in select watches. Watchmakers appreciate the unique properties of platinum, as it is more durable than gold, but similarly does not tarnish.

During periods of sustained economic stability and growth, the price of platinum can exceed that of the price of gold. As an investment, platinum is similar to gold in being a relatively low risk investment, or "safe-haven", in times of economic crisis. When the price of gold has exceeded that of platinum, many buyers in major markets, including the famous Dubai "gold souk" have turned to buying platinum instead for investment and for jewelry.

In the 18th century King Louis XV of France said of platinum that it is "the only metal fit for a king", owing to platinum's scarcity, traits, and intrinsic value.

As of 2024, the American multinational warehouse club chain, Costco, sells platinum bars on its website.

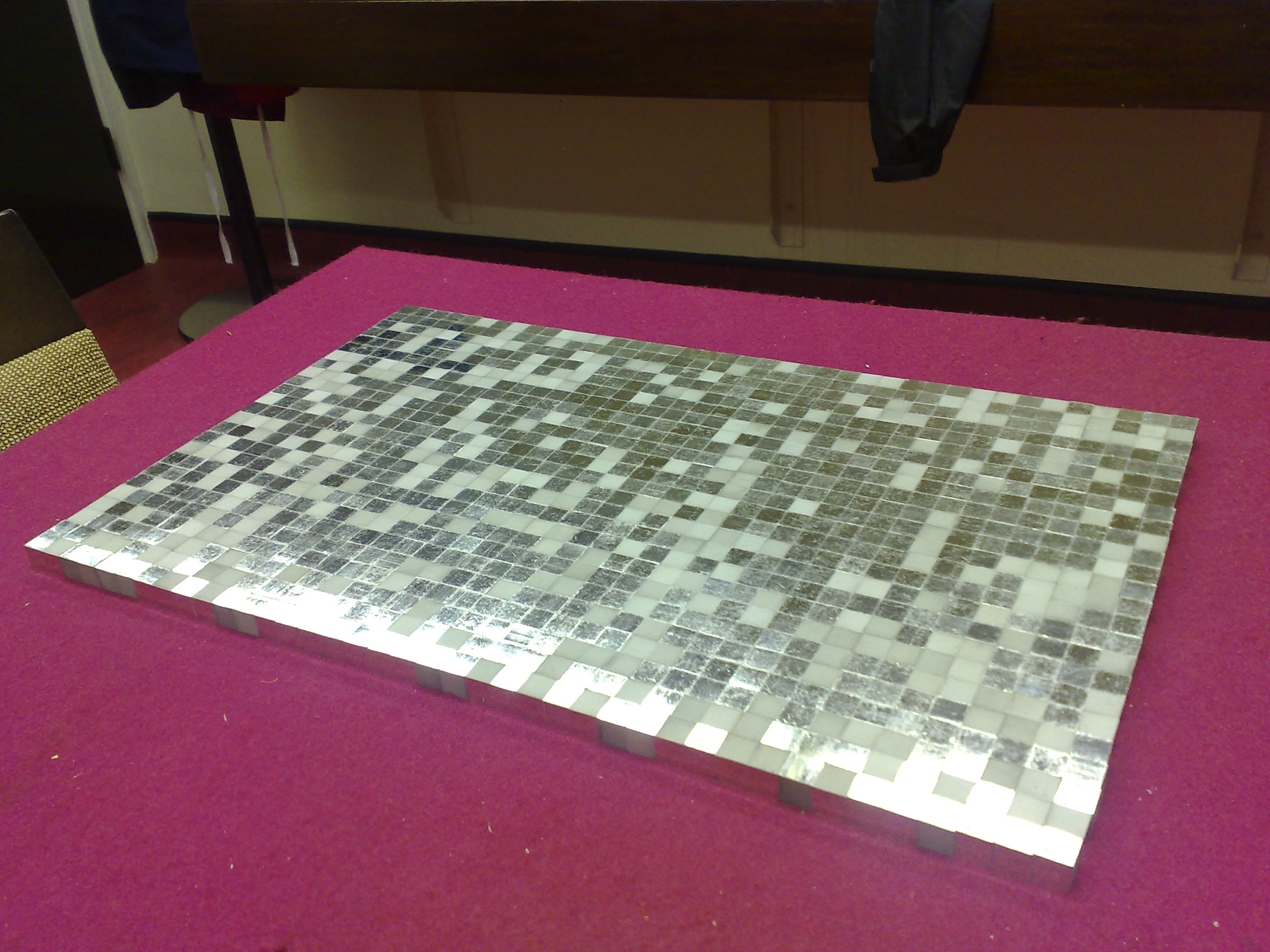
1,000 cubic centimeters of 99.9 % pure platinum, worth about US$696,000 as of 29 Jun 2016 ($933,694 adjusted for inflation)

=== Other uses ===
In the laboratory, platinum wire is used for electrodes; platinum pans and supports are used in thermogravimetric analysis because of the stringent requirements of chemical inertness upon heating to high temperatures (~1000 °C). Platinum is used as an alloying agent for various metal products, including fine wires, noncorrosive laboratory containers, medical instruments, dental prostheses, electrical contacts, and thermocouples. Platinum-cobalt, an alloy of roughly three parts platinum and one part cobalt, is used to make relatively strong permanent magnets. Platinum-based anodes are used in ships, pipelines, and steel piers. Platinum drugs are used to treat a wide variety of cancers, including testicular and ovarian carcinomas, melanoma, small-cell and non-small-cell lung cancer, myelomas and lymphomas.

=== Symbol of prestige in marketing ===
Platinum's rarity as a metal has caused advertisers to associate it with exclusivity and wealth. "Platinum" debit and credit cards have greater privileges than "gold" cards. "Platinum awards" are frequently the highest, or near highest possible, often ranking above "gold", "silver" and "bronze". In the United States, a musical album that has sold more than 1 million copies will be credited as "platinum". Some products, such as blenders and vehicles, with a silvery-white color are identified as "platinum". The frame of the Crown of Queen Elizabeth the Queen Mother, manufactured for her coronation as consort of King George VI, is made of platinum. It was the first British crown to be made of this particular metal.

== See also ==
- Chelated platinum
- Iron–platinum nanoparticle
- List of countries by platinum production
- Mixed metal oxide electrode
- Nox (unit)
- Platinum group
- Platinum in Africa
- Platinum nanoparticle
- Platinum print
- Skot (unit)
- 2000s commodities boom
