= Pierre-François Chabaneau =

French chemist (1754–1842)

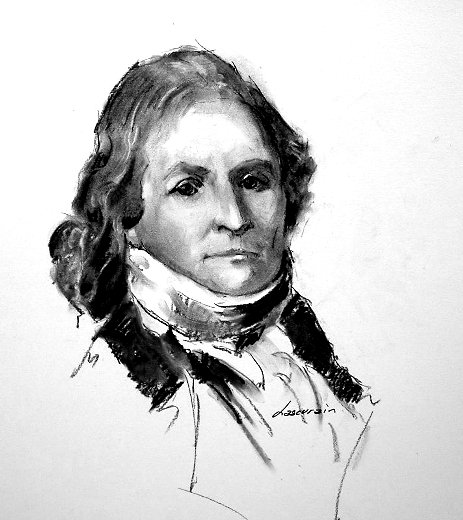
- Born: 27 June 1754; Nontron, France
- Died: 18 February 1842 (aged 87); Lussas, France
- Other name: Chavaneau
- Occupations: Chemist, teacher
- Known for: Producing malleable platinum

Pierre-François Chabaneau (27 June 1754 – 18 February 1842) was a French chemist who spent much of his life working in Spain. He was one of the first chemists to succeed in producing malleable platinum. Chabaneau was born in Dordogne, France, and died near his home village at the age of 88 years.

== Early life ==
Chabaneau was born in 1754 in Nontron, a village in the Dordogne department of France. His uncle, a member of the order of Saint Anthony, encouraged him to study theology. While Chabaneau excelled in his studies, his distaste for metaphysical speculation led him to antagonize his teachers, which in turn caused him to be expelled from school.

Sympathetic towards Chabaneau's state of poverty, the director of a Jesuit college in Passy offered him a position as a mathematics professor, despite Chabaneau having only a basic understanding of arithmetic. In studying the material for the next day's lessons, Chabaneau taught himself algebra and geometry. His academic interest soon spread to physics, natural history, and chemistry. At the age of twenty, Chabaneau was convinced to join the newly established Real Seminario Patriotico at Vergara to teach French and physics by brothers Fausto and Juan José Elhuyar. The two brothers, who later made a name for themselves by isolating metallic tungsten, had been hired by the Count of Peñaflorida, who had sent them to France to find professors for the Vergara Seminary.

== Platinum research ==
After the Elhuyar brothers isolated metallic tungsten in 1783, Chabaneau collaborated with them in researching platinum. This did not last long, though, as the brothers had been appointed Directors General of Mining, and soon left Spain for South America. King Charles III created a public chair of mineralogy, physics and chemistry for Chabaneau in Madrid and provided him with a laboratory for his research. The Count d'Aranda secured the government's entire supply of platinum for Chabaneau's laboratory.

Chabaneau was able to easily remove most of platinum's natural impurities, including gold, mercury, lead, copper, and iron, leading him to believe that he was working with pure platinum. However, the metal displayed inconsistent characteristics. At times it was malleable, yet at times it was highly brittle. Sometimes it was entirely incombustible, yet sometimes it burned readily. These inconsistencies were a result of various impurities: rhodium, palladium, osmium, iridium, and ruthenium. These elements would later come to be known as the platinum group metals, but at the time of Chabaneau's research, they had not yet been discovered.

So frustrated was Chabaneau by his research that, in 1786, he lost his temper and smashed all of his equipment, exclaiming, "Away with it all! I'll smash the whole business; you shall never again get me to touch the damned metal!" Nevertheless, three months later Chabaneau presented the Count d'Aranda with a 10 cm cube of pure malleable platinum. His process, involving powder metallurgy and intense heating, was kept secret until 1914.

== Platinum age and death ==
Chabaneau realized that the sheer difficulty of working with platinum would lend value to objects made from it. He and Don Joaquín Cabezas carried on a lucrative business producing platinum ingots and utensils. This marked the beginning of what is now known as the "platinum age in Spain," during which nearly 18,000 troy ounces of malleable platinum were produced in a span of 22 years. The platinum age ended in 1808 when Chabaneau's laboratory was destroyed during Napoleon's second invasion.

In 1799, Chabaneau returned to France seeking rest near his native village of Nontron. There he remained until January 1842, when he died at the age of 88 years.
