= NMR tube =

Laboratory glassware

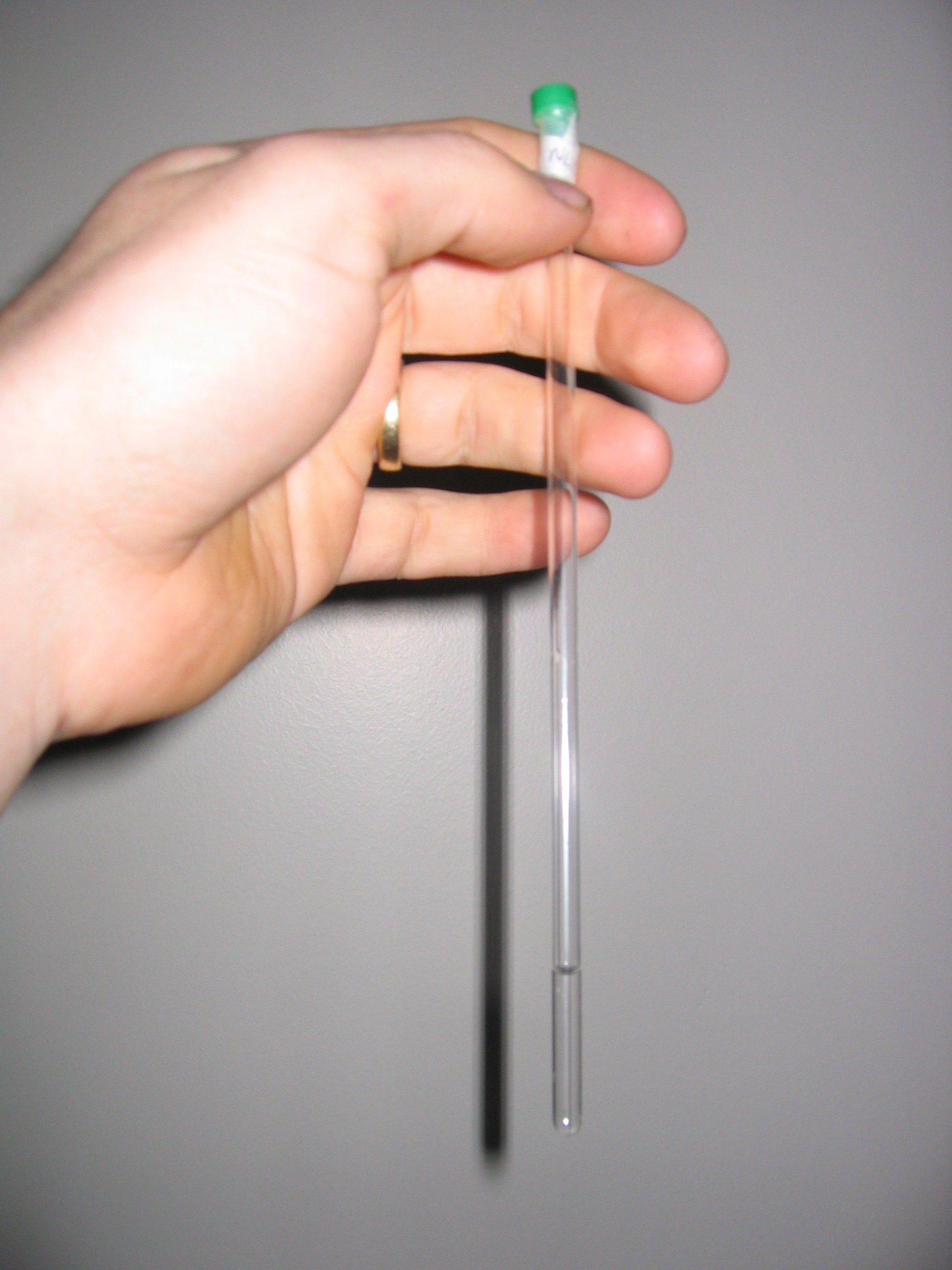
An NMR tube filled with a colorless sample, sealed with a green polyethylene cap and Parafilm

An NMR tube is a thin glass walled tube used to contain samples in nuclear magnetic resonance spectroscopy. Typically NMR tubes come in 5 mm diameters but 10 mm and 3 mm samples are known. It is important that the tubes are uniformly thick and well-balanced to ensure that NMR tube spins at a regular rate (i.e., they do not wobble), usually about 20 Hz in the NMR spectrometer.

== Construction ==
NMR tubes are typically made of borosilicate glass. They are available in seven and eight inch lengths; a 5 mm tube outer diameter is most common, but 3 mm and 10 mm outer diameters are available as well. Where boron NMR is desired, quartz NMR tubes containing low concentrations of boron (as opposed to borosilicate glass) are available. Specialized closures such as J. Young valves and screwcap closures are available aside from more common polyethylene caps.

Two common specifications for NMR tubes are concentricity and camber. Concentricity refers to the variation in the radial centers, measured at the inner and outer walls. Camber refers to the "straightness" of the tube. Poor values for either may cause poorer quality spectra by reducing the homogeneity of the sample. In particular, an NMR tube which has poor camber may wobble when rotated, giving rise to spinning side bands. With modern manufacturing techniques even cheap tubes give good spectra for routine applications.

== Sample preparation ==
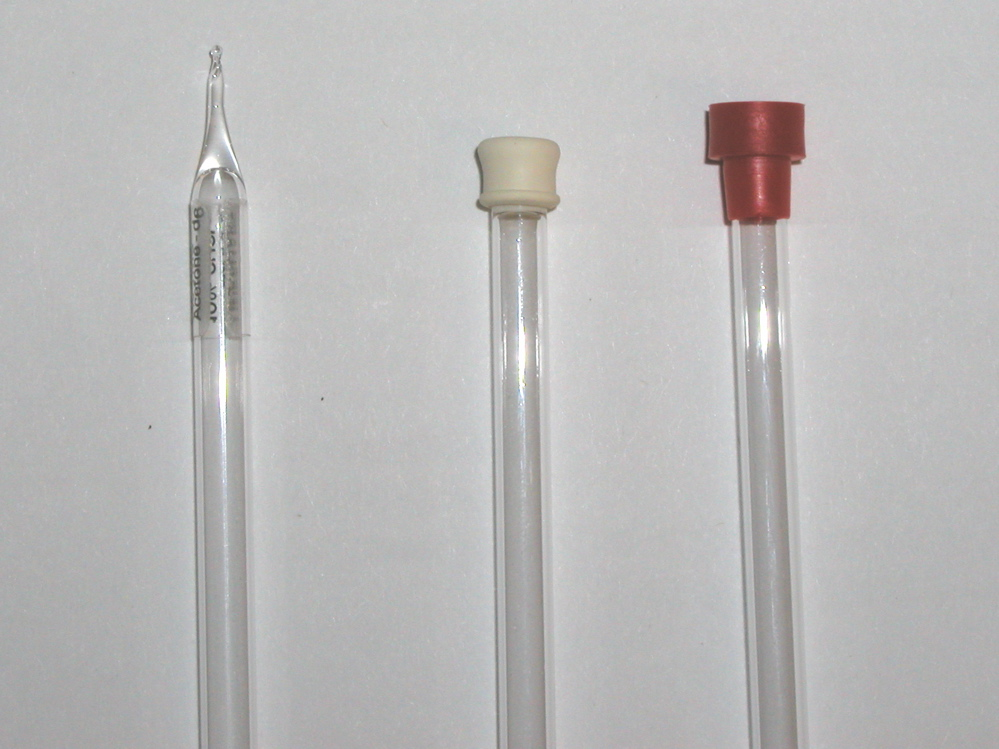
Left to right: Flame, septum and polyethylene cap sealed NMR tubes

Usually, only a small sample is dissolved in an appropriate solvent. For ^{1}H NMR experiments, this will usually be a deuterated solvent such as CDCl_{3}. Sufficient solvent should be used in order to fill the tube by 4–5 cm (depending on the spectrometer). Protein NMR is usually performed in a 90% H_{2}O (or buffer)/10% D_{2}O mixture.

The sample may be sonicated or agitated to aid dissolution, and solids are removed via filtering through a plug of celite layered on a cotton wool plug in a Pasteur pipette, directly into the NMR tube.

The NMR tube is then usually sealed with a polyethylene cap, but can be flame sealed or sealed with a Teflon 'Schlenk' tap or even a very small rubber septum. Parafilm may be wrapped around the cap to reduce solvent evaporation.

== Shigemi tubes ==
A Shigemi tube is a microscale NMR tube used with an ordinary-size NMR tube. Shigemi tubes may be appropriate for protein NMR experiments, where only a smaller sample is available. A corresponding smaller solvent volume is desired to maintain a higher sample concentration. The reduced sample depth is compensated for by solid glass on the NMR tube beneath the level of sample, which varies for the make of spectrometer. Once air bubbles have been expelled, the plunger is secured to the tube proper by parafilm. Ideally, the tubes are matched with the deuterated solvent used to have better spectrum resolution.

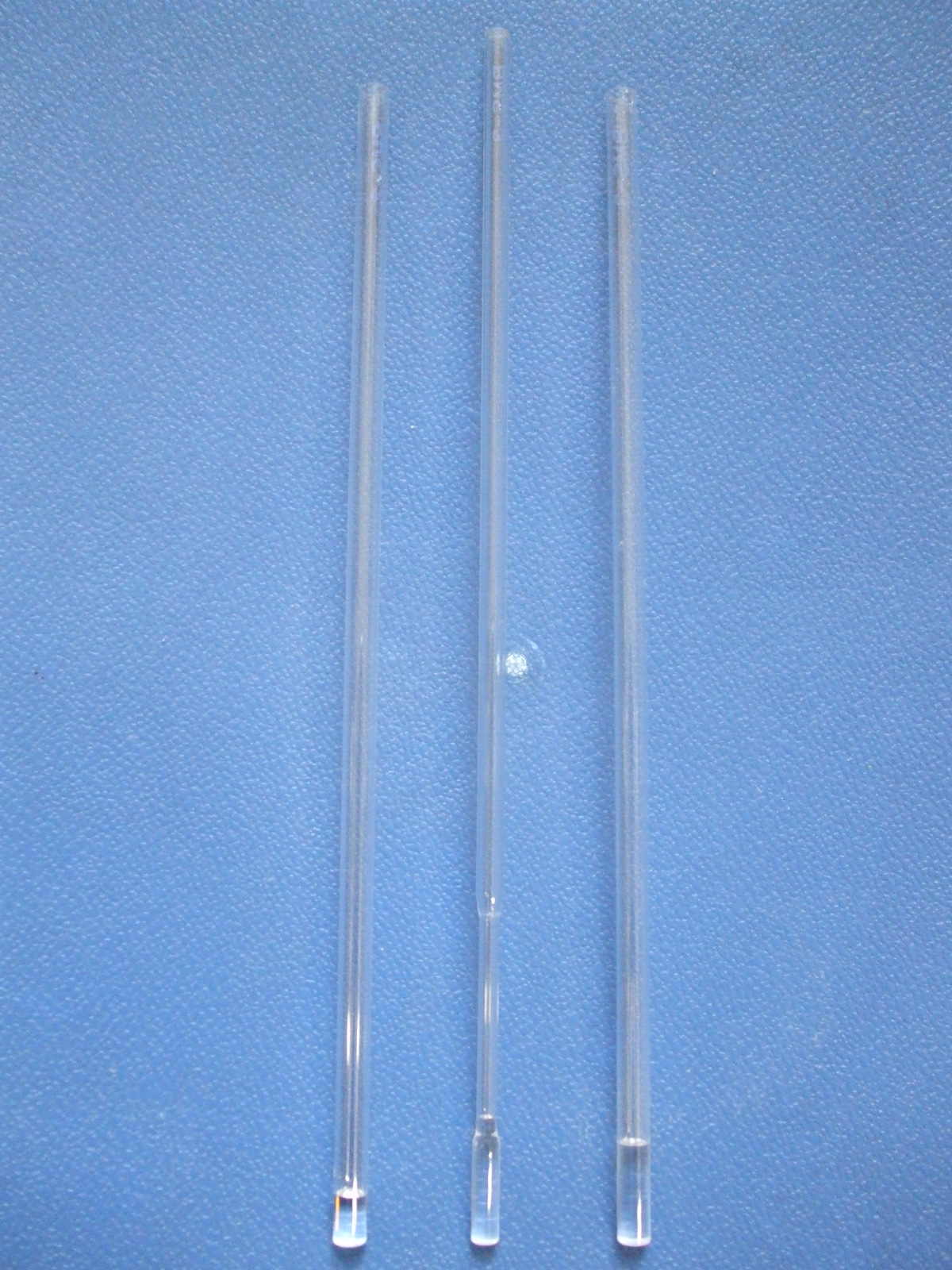
Plunger/insert centre, left 8 mm "bottom length" outer tube suitable for Bruker and Varian NMR spectrometers, right 15 mm outer tube suitable for Varian only

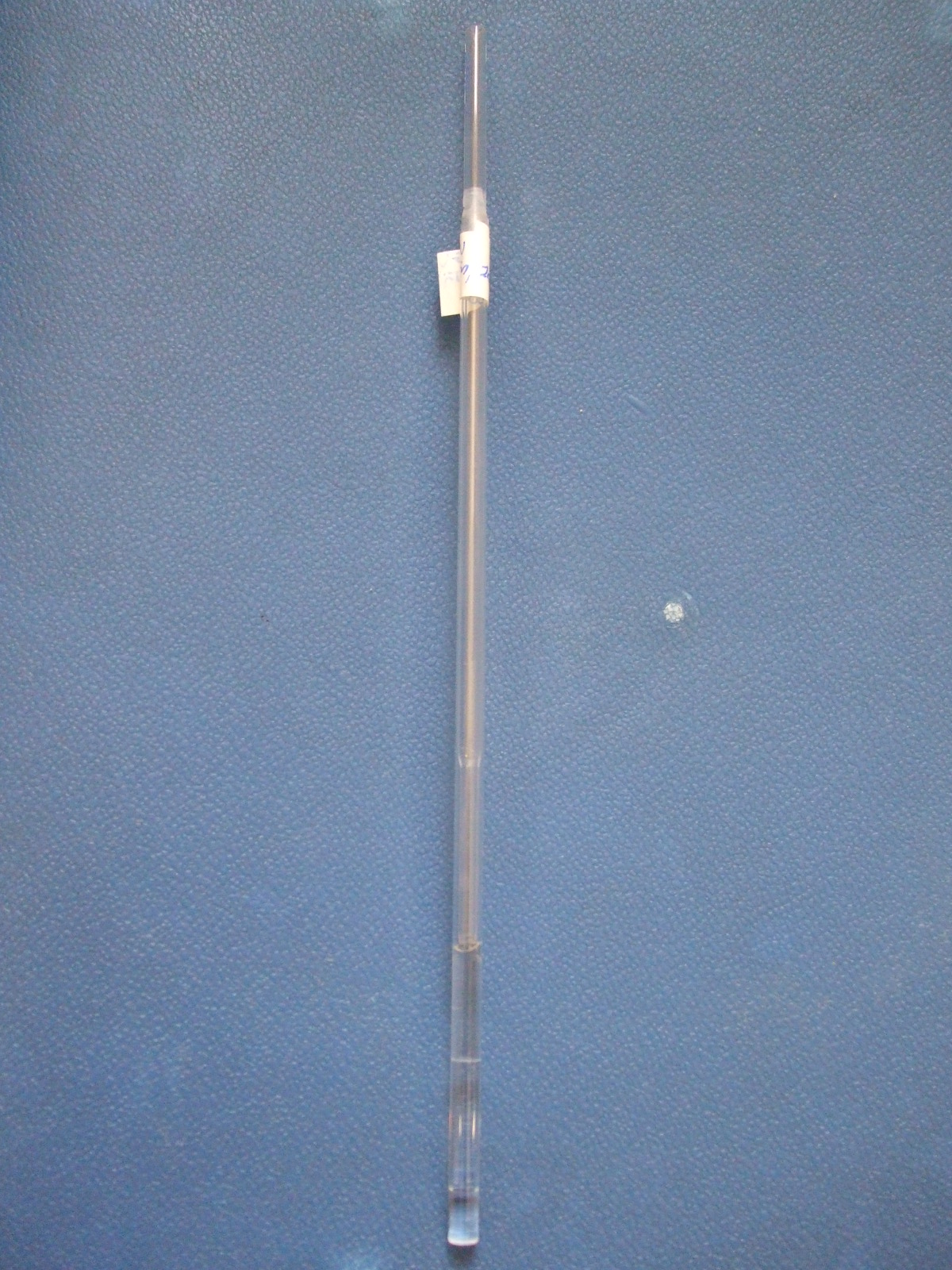
Fully assembled 8 mm Shigemi tube, insert secured to outer tube with parafilm

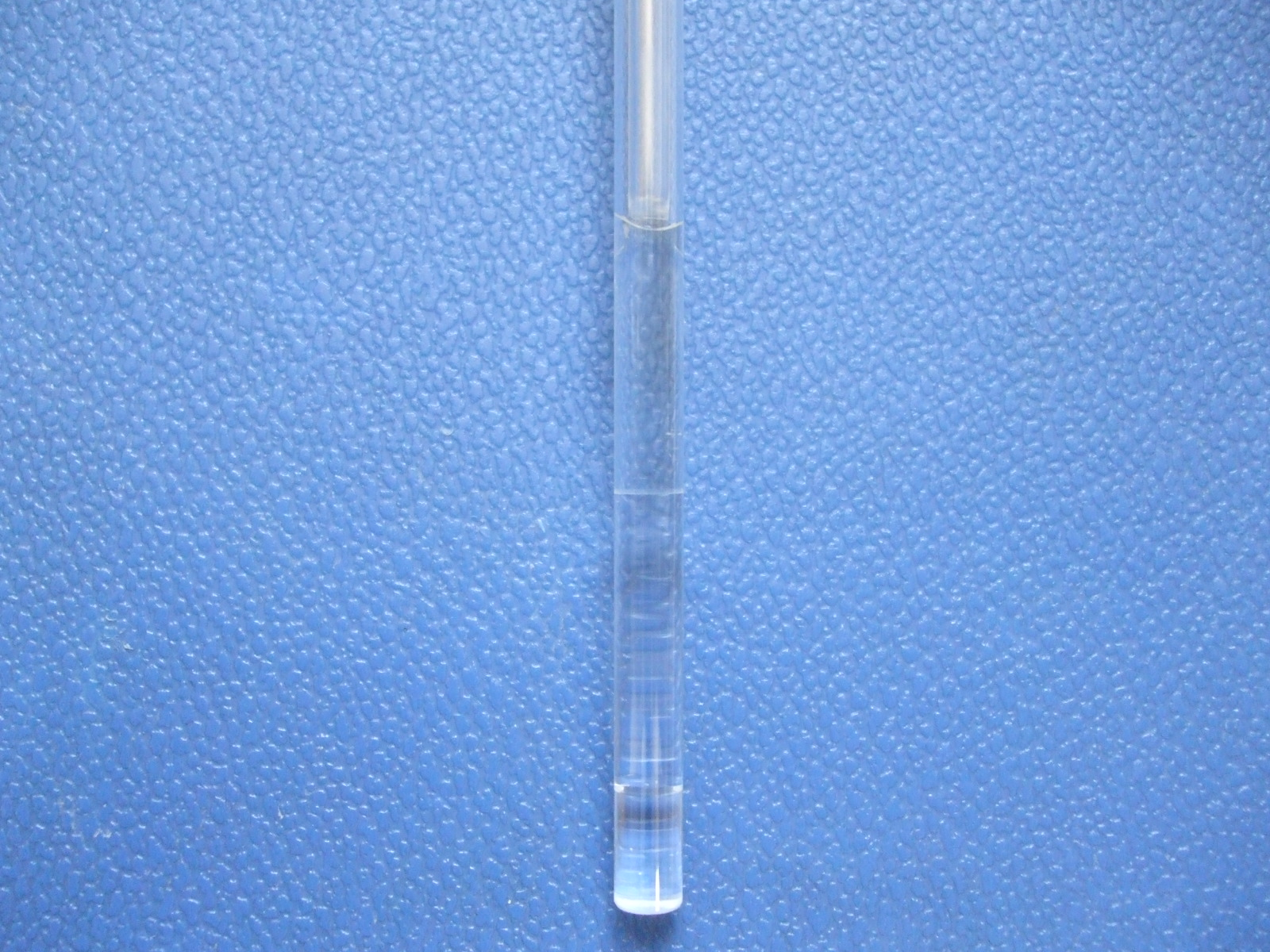
Close-up of the sample lying in between insert and "bottom length"

== Cleaning ==
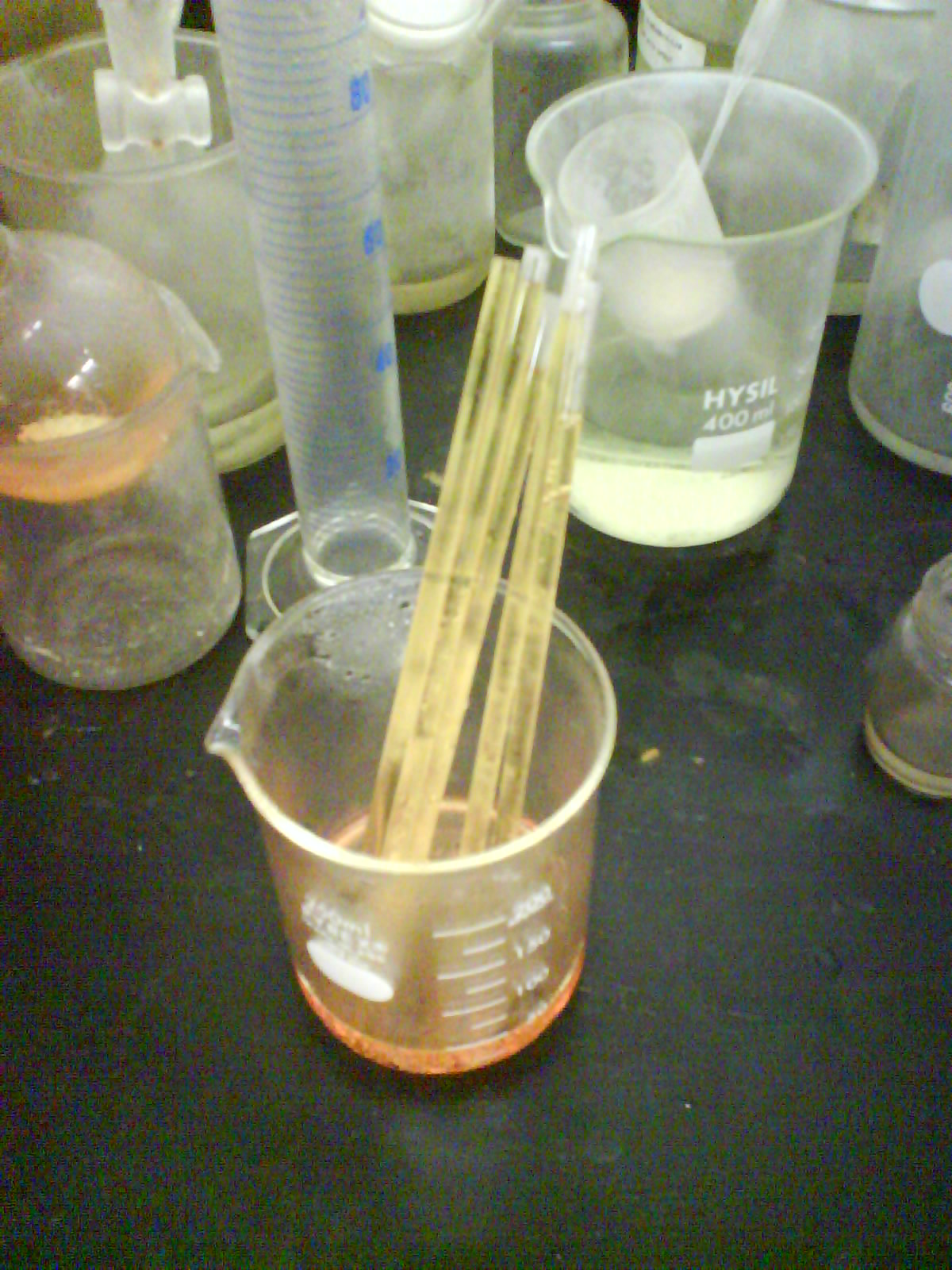
Aqua regia has been added to these NMR tubes to remove all traces of organic material.

NMR tube cleaning apparatus: 1: NMR tube, 2: Compound residue, 3, 4: NMR tube cap, able to form a vacuum seal, 5: Cleaning Tube fits within NMR tube, 6: Solvent reservoir container, 7: Solvent/solvent level, 8: Vacuum applied, 9: Waste solvent.

NMR tubes are hard to clean because of their small bore. They are cleaned best before the sample has dried.

Cleaning is performed usually by rinsing with the same (non-deuterated) solvent used to dissolve the initial sample. Dichloromethane or acetone are good choices because dichloromethane is similar in polarity to chloroform, a common NMR solvent, while acetone dissolves many organic compounds. Sonication and scrubbing with a pipe cleaner may be helpful in removing traces of solid contaminants. If necessary, the tube may be filled with an oxidizing solution of aqua regia or piranha solution (H_{2}O_{2}/H_{2}SO_{4}). Care should be taken with these solutions, as they can unexpectedly and violently erupt from the NMR tube due to pressure build-up (aqua regia) or explosion (piranha). Chromic acid solutions are never used, due to traces of paramagnetic chromium left behind on the tubes causing interference with NMR experiments.

When the NMR tube is determined to be clean, it is triple-rinsed with distilled water and left to air-dry or dry in an oven at low temperature. It is best not to exceed 60 °C. At higher temperatures, slight tube distortion can occur which will affect tube camber. If NMR tubes are washed, a final rinse is recommended with a solvent that easily evaporates at 60 °C and that has no residue such as methanol. Avoid acetone, which leaves a residue.

=== NMR tube cleaner ===
A better alternative to the use of potentially hazardous oxidizers is an NMR tube cleaner (right). It is an apparatus which uses a vacuum to flush solvent and/or a detergent solution through the entire length of the NMR tube.

In this apparatus, the NMR tube 1 (with the cap 3 fixed to the base of the NMR tube), is placed upside down on the apparatus. The NMR tube fits over an inner tube 5 linked to the solvent reservoir 6. The NMR cap rests on the outer tube of the apparatus 4. A vacuum is applied (usually via a water aspirator via the vacuum inlet). The NMR tube cap forms a vacuum seal. Solvent 7 is drawn from the solvent reservoir 6 and is forced to the base of the NMR tube and flushes the NMR tube out 9 with solvent cleaning it. Note to complete the vacuum a flask is attached to the NMR tube cleaning apparatus.

This sort of apparatus is commercially available, though it is costly and easy to destroy by shattering or breaking off the cleaning tube. Equivalent designs may be assembled from ordinary labware as well.

== Gallery ==
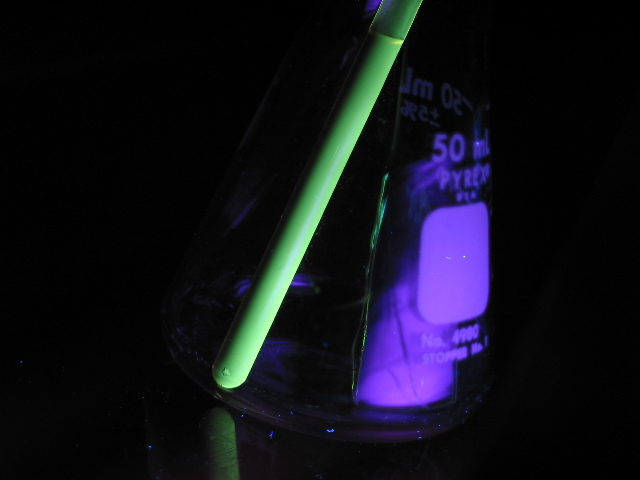
A sample of polythiophenes in an NMR tube. Due to the high degree of conjugation, the sample fluoresces under ultraviolet light.

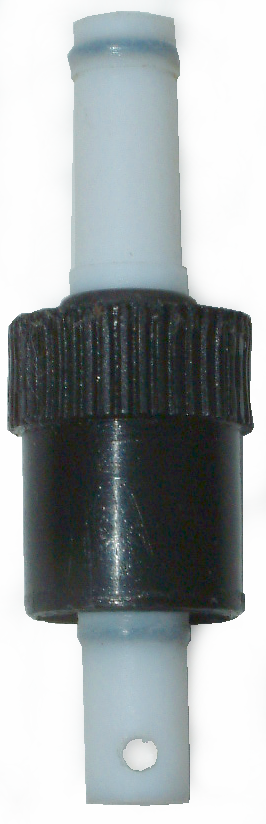
Teflon tap used to seal NMR tubes for air-sensitive samples – has a central bore starting at the top of the tap, which splits into a T-junction at the bottom. One of the openings of the inverted "T" can be seen in this picture.

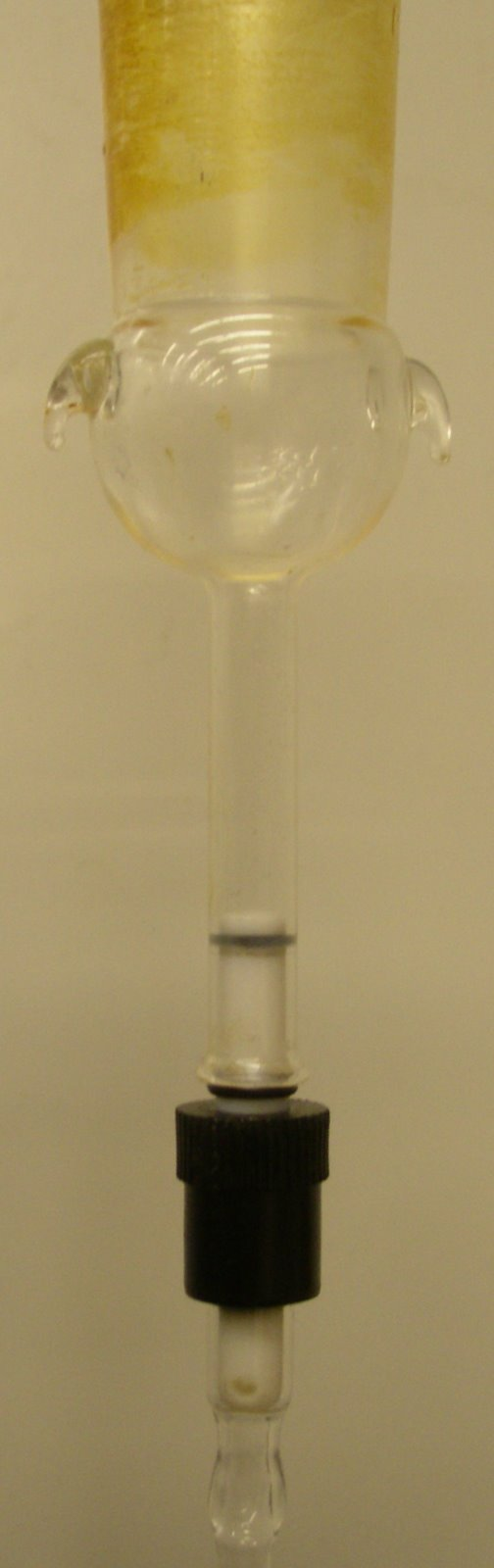
A J. Young NMR tube attached to an adapter with a female 24/40 joint already greased. Note the hole resulting from the T-bore in the side of the PTFE plug.

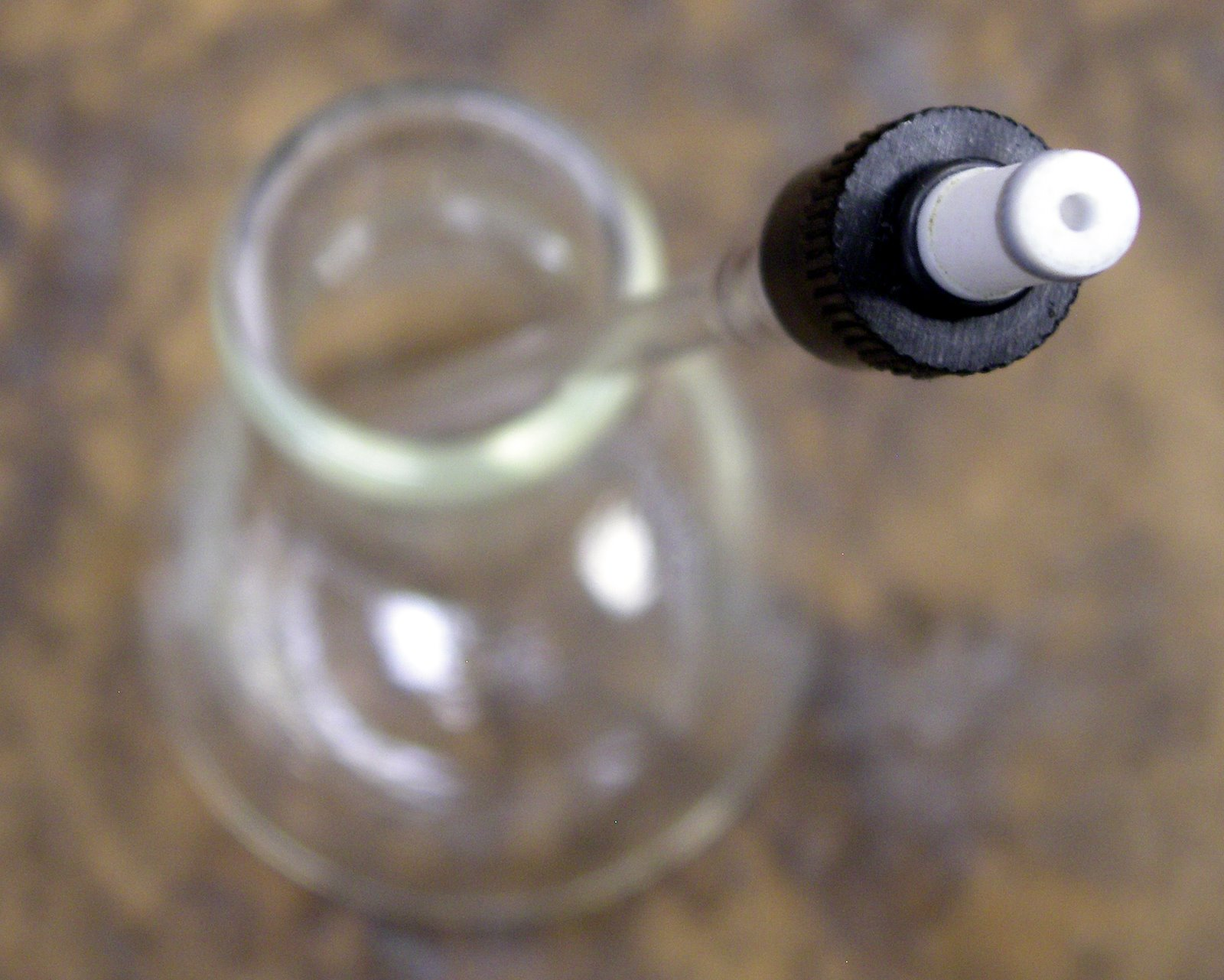
A J. Young NMR tube from above looking down the hole that leads to the T-bore.
