= Green death =

Aggressive solution used to test the resistance of metals to corrosion

Green death is a solution used to test the resistance of metals and alloys to corrosion. It consists of a mixture of sulfuric acid, hydrochloric acid, iron(III) chloride and copper(II) chloride and its boiling point is at approximately 103 °C. Its typical chemical composition is given in the table hereafter:

Chemical composition of the green death solution
Reagent	Formula (—)	Usually (wt. %)	Min (wt. %)	Max (wt. %)
Sulfuric acid	H_{2}SO_{4}	11.9	11.5	11.9
Hydrochloric acid	HCl	1.3	1.2	1.3
Iron(III) chloride	FeCl_{3}	1.0	1.0	1.0
Copper(II) chloride	CuCl_{2}	1.0	1.0	1.0

== Uses ==
The chemical composition of the green death solution allows it to achieve a particularly aggressive oxidizing chloride solution. Indeed, among the four reagents, all are oxidizing species (H_{2}SO_{4}, Fe^{3+}, Cu^{2+}) except hydrochloric acid (HCl) in which the chlorine atom is present in its lowest oxidation state as Cl^{−} anion. The chloride anions, also added to the solution as counter-ions of iron(III) and copper(II) species, are very aggressive for the localized corrosion of metals and alloys as they induce severe pitting corrosion problems. The green death solution is also used to determine the critical pitting temperature (CPT) and the critical crevice temperature (CCT) of metals and alloys.

== See also ==
- Aqua regia – Mixture of nitric acid and hydrochloric acid in a 1:3 molar ratio
- Piranha solution – Oxidizing acid mixture containing sulfuric acid and hydrogen peroxide
