= RCA clean =

Silicon wafer cleaning procedure in semiconductor manufacturing

The RCA clean is a standard set of wafer cleaning steps which need to be performed before high-temperature processing steps (oxidation, diffusion, CVD) of silicon wafers in semiconductor manufacturing.

Werner Kern developed the basic procedure in 1965 while working for RCA, the Radio Corporation of America. It involves the following chemical processes performed in sequence:

1. Removal of the organic contaminants (organic clean + particle clean)
2. Removal of thin oxide layer (oxide strip, optional)
3. Removal of ionic contamination (ionic clean)

== Standard recipe ==
The wafers are prepared by soaking them in deionized water. If they are grossly contaminated (visible residues), they may require a preliminary cleanup in piranha solution. The wafers are thoroughly rinsed with deionized water between each step.

Ideally, the steps below are carried out by immersing the wafers in solutions prepared in fused silica or fused quartz vessels (borosilicate glassware must not be used, as its impurities leach out and cause contamination). Likewise it is recommended that the chemicals used be of electronic grade (or "CMOS grade") to avoid impurities that will recontaminate the wafer.

=== First step (SC-1): organic clean + particle clean ===
The first step (called SC-1, where SC stands for Standard Clean) is performed with a solution of (ratios may vary)

- 5 parts of deionized water
- 1 part of ammonia water, (29% by weight of NH_{3})
- 1 part of aqueous H_{2}O_{2} (hydrogen peroxide, 30%)

at 75 or 80 °C typically for 10 minutes. This base-peroxide mixture removes organic residues. Particles are also very effectively removed, even insoluble particles, since SC-1 modifies the surface and particle zeta potentials and causes them to repel. This treatment results in the formation of a thin silicon dioxide layer (about 1 nm) on the silicon surface, along with a certain degree of metallic contamination (notably iron) that will be removed in subsequent steps.

=== Second step (optional): oxide strip ===
The optional second step (for bare silicon wafers) is a short immersion in a 1:100 or 1:50 solution of aqueous HF (hydrofluoric acid) at 25 °C for about fifteen seconds, in order to remove the thin oxide layer and some fraction of ionic contaminants. If this step is performed without ultra high purity materials and ultra clean containers, it can lead to recontamination since the bare silicon surface is very reactive. In any case, the subsequent step (SC-2) dissolves and regrows the oxide layer.

=== Third step (SC-2): ionic clean ===
The third and last step (called SC-2) is performed with a solution of (ratios may vary)

- 6 parts of deionized water
- 1 part of aqueous HCl (hydrochloric acid, 37% by weight)
- 1 part of aqueous H_{2}O_{2} (hydrogen peroxide, 30%)

at 75 or 80 °C, typically for 10 minutes. This treatment effectively removes the remaining traces of metallic (ionic) contaminants, some of which were introduced in the SC-1 cleaning step. It also leaves a thin passivating layer on the wafer surface, which protects the surface from subsequent contamination (bare exposed silicon is contaminated immediately).

=== Fourth step: rinsing and drying ===
Provided the RCA clean is performed with high-purity chemicals and clean glassware, it results in a very clean wafer surface while the wafer is still submersed in water. The rinsing and drying steps must be performed correctly (e.g., with flowing water) since the surface can be easily recontaminated by organics and particulates floating on the surface of water. A variety of procedures can be used to rinse and dry the wafer effectively.

== Additions ==
The first step in the ex situ cleaning process is to ultrasonically degrease the wafer in trichloroethylene, acetone and methanol.

== See also ==
- Chemical-mechanical planarization
- Piranha solution
- Plasma etching
- Silicon on insulator
- Wafer (electronics)
