= Aqua regia =

Mixture of nitric acid and hydrochloric acid in a 1:3 molar ratio

Aqua regia (Note: The information in the infobox is specific to a 1:3 molar mixing ratio between nitric acid and hydrochloric acid.)

Names
- IUPAC name Nitric acid trihydrochloride
- Other names: Aqua regis; Nitrohydrochloric acid; Royal water

Identifiers
CAS Number	8007-56-5
3D model (JSmol)	Interactive image
PubChem CID	90477010
UNII	X3TT5X989E
CompTox Dashboard (EPA)	DTXSID50893666
- SMILES: [N+](=O)(O)[O-].Cl.Cl.Cl

Properties
Chemical formula	HNO_{3} + 3 HCl
Appearance	Fuming liquid. Freshly prepared aqua regia is colourless, but it turns yellow, orange, or red within seconds.
Density	1.01–1.21 g/cm^{3}
Melting point	−42 °C (−44 °F; 231 K)
Boiling point	108 °C (226 °F; 381 K)
Solubility in water	Miscible
Vapor pressure	21 mbar

Hazards
NFPA 704 (fire diamond)	3 0 0 OX
- Except where otherwise noted, data are given for materials in their standard state (at 25 °C [77 °F], 100 kPa). Infobox references

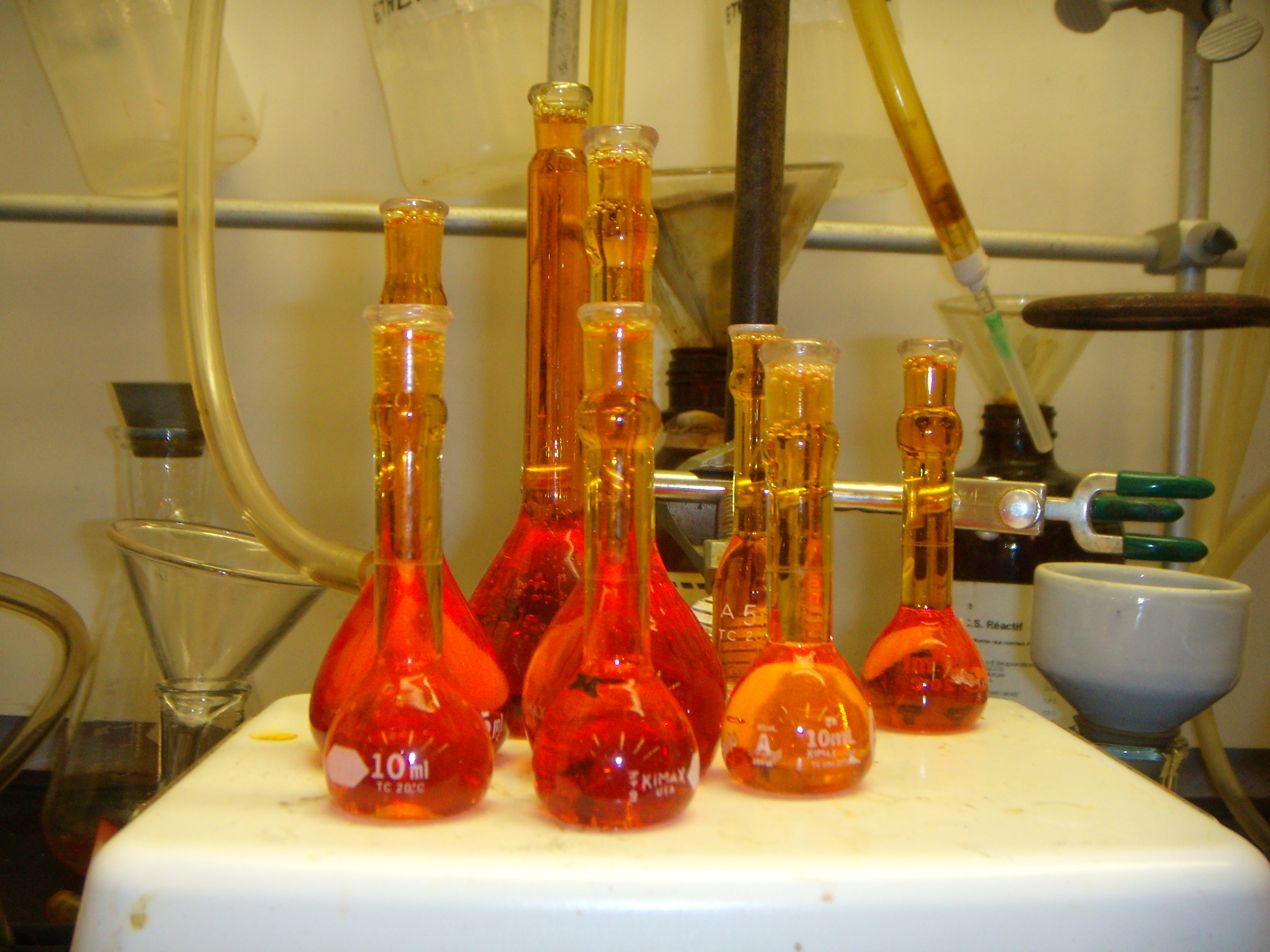
Freshly prepared aqua regia to remove metal salt deposits

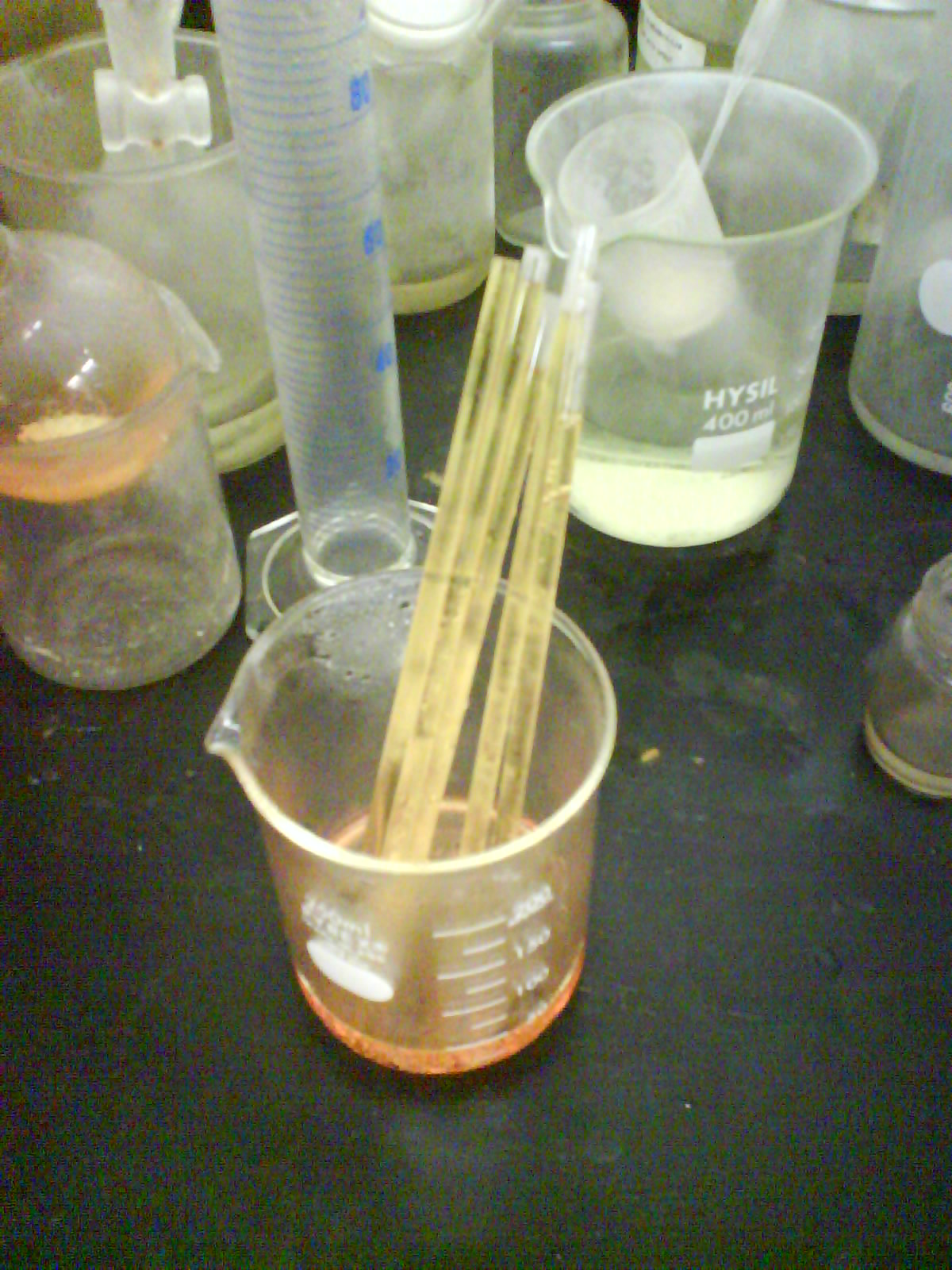
Freshly prepared aqua regia is colorless, but it turns orange within seconds. Here, fresh aqua regia has been added to these NMR tubes to remove all traces of organic material.

Aqua regia (/ˈreɪɡiə, ˈriːdʒiə/; from Latin, "regal water" or "royal water") is a mixture of nitric acid and hydrochloric acid, optimally in a molar mixing ratio of 1:3. (Note: The relative concentrations of the two acids in water differ; values could be 65% w/v for nitric acid and 35% w/v for hydrochloric acid – that is, the actual HNO_{3}:HCl mass ratio is less than 1:2.) Aqua regia is highly corrosive and fuming liquid. Freshly prepared aqua regia is colorless, but it turns yellow, orange, or red within seconds from the formation of nitrosyl chloride and nitrogen dioxide. It was so named by alchemists because it can dissolve noble metals, such as gold and platinum, while leaving many other metals unaffected. It has been used to process or conceal gold into the modern era.

== Preparation and decomposition ==
Upon mixing of concentrated hydrochloric acid and concentrated nitric acid, chemical reactions occur. These reactions result in the volatile products nitrosyl chloride and chlorine gas:

HNO_{3} + 3 HCl → NOCl + Cl_{2} + 2 H_{2}O

as evidenced by the fuming nature and characteristic yellow color of aqua regia. As the volatile products escape from solution, aqua regia loses its potency. Nitrosyl chloride (NOCl) can further decompose into nitric oxide (NO) and elemental chlorine (Cl_{2}):

2 NOCl → 2 NO + Cl_{2}

This dissociation is equilibrium-limited. Therefore, in addition to nitrosyl chloride and chlorine, the fumes over aqua regia also contain nitric oxide (NO). Because nitric oxide readily reacts with atmospheric oxygen, the gases produced also contain nitrogen dioxide, NO_{2} (red fume):

2 NO + O_{2} → 2 NO_{2}

== Applications ==
Aqua regia is primarily used to produce chloroauric acid, the electrolyte in the Wohlwill process for refining the highest purity (99.999%) gold.

Aqua regia is also used in etching and in specific analytic procedures. It is also used in some laboratories to clean glassware of organic compounds and metal particles. This method is preferred among most over the more traditional chromic acid bath for cleaning NMR tubes, because no traces of paramagnetic chromium can remain to spoil spectra. While chromic acid baths are discouraged because of the high toxicity of chromium and the potential for explosions, aqua regia is itself very corrosive and has been implicated in several explosions due to mishandling.

Because its components react quickly, resulting in its decomposition, aqua regia quickly loses its effectiveness (yet remains a strong acid), so its components are usually only mixed immediately before use.

== Chemistry ==
=== Dissolving gold ===
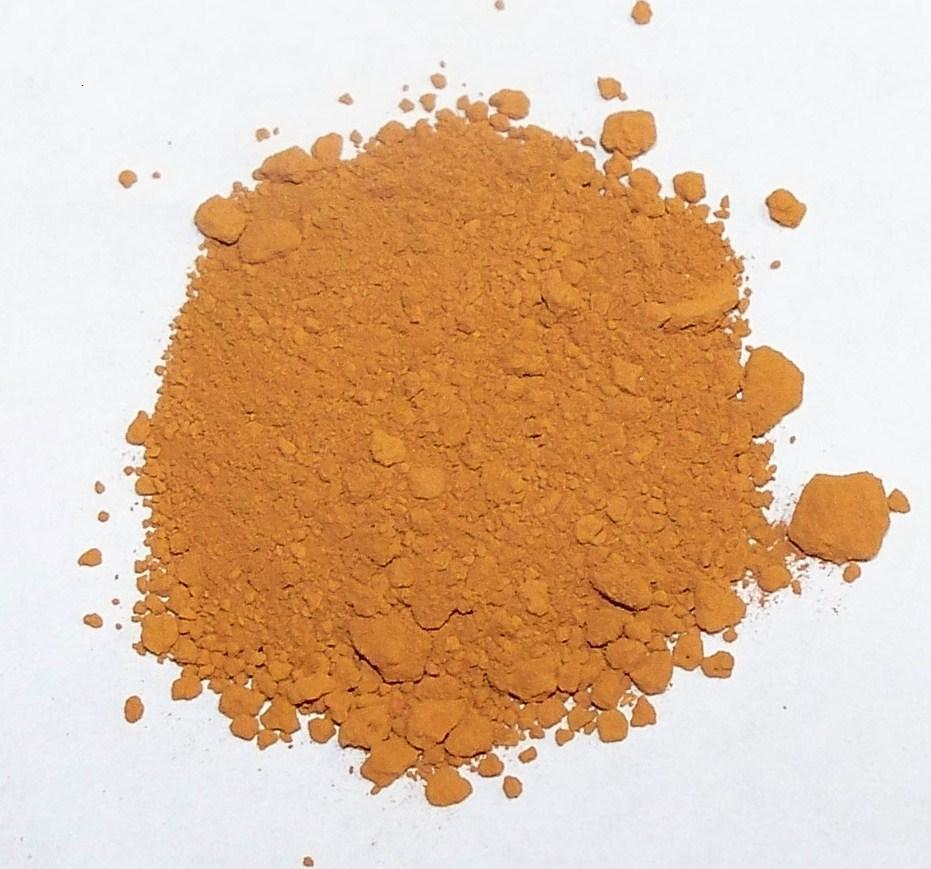
Pure gold precipitate produced by the aqua regia chemical refining process

Aqua regia dissolves gold, although neither constituent acid can dissolve significant quantities alone. Nitric acid is a powerful oxidizer, which will dissolve a very small quantity of gold, forming gold(III) ions (Au^{3+}). The hydrochloric acid provides a ready supply of chloride ions (Cl^{−}), which react with the gold ions to produce tetrachloroaurate(III) anions ([AuCl_{4}]^{−}), also in solution. The reaction with hydrochloric acid is an equilibrium reaction that favors formation of tetrachloroaurate(III) anions. This results in a removal of gold ions from solution and allows further oxidation of gold to take place. The gold dissolves to become chloroauric acid. In addition, gold may be dissolved by the chlorine present in aqua regia. The equations are:

Au + 3 HNO_{3} + 4 HCl $\ce{<=>>}$ [AuCl_{4}]^{−} + 3 NO_{2} + H_{3}O^{+} + 2 H_{2}O

or

Au + HNO_{3} + 4 HCl $\ce{<=>>}$ [AuCl_{4}]^{−} + NO + H_{3}O^{+} + H_{2}O.

Solid tetrachloroauric acid may be isolated by evaporating the excess aqua regia, and decomposing the residual nitric acid by repeatedly heating the solution with additional hydrochloric acid. That step reduces nitric acid (see decomposition of aqua regia). If elemental gold is desired, it may be selectively reduced with reducing agents such as sulfur dioxide, hydrazine, oxalic acid, etc. The equation for the reduction of oxidized gold (Au^{3+}) by sulfur dioxide (SO_{2}) is the following:

2 [AuCl_{4}]^{−}(aq) + 3 SO_{2}(g) + 6 H_{2}O(l) → 2 Au(s) + 12 H^{+}(aq) + 3 SO^{2−}_{4}(aq) + 8 Cl^{−}(aq)

Dissolution of gold by aqua regia.

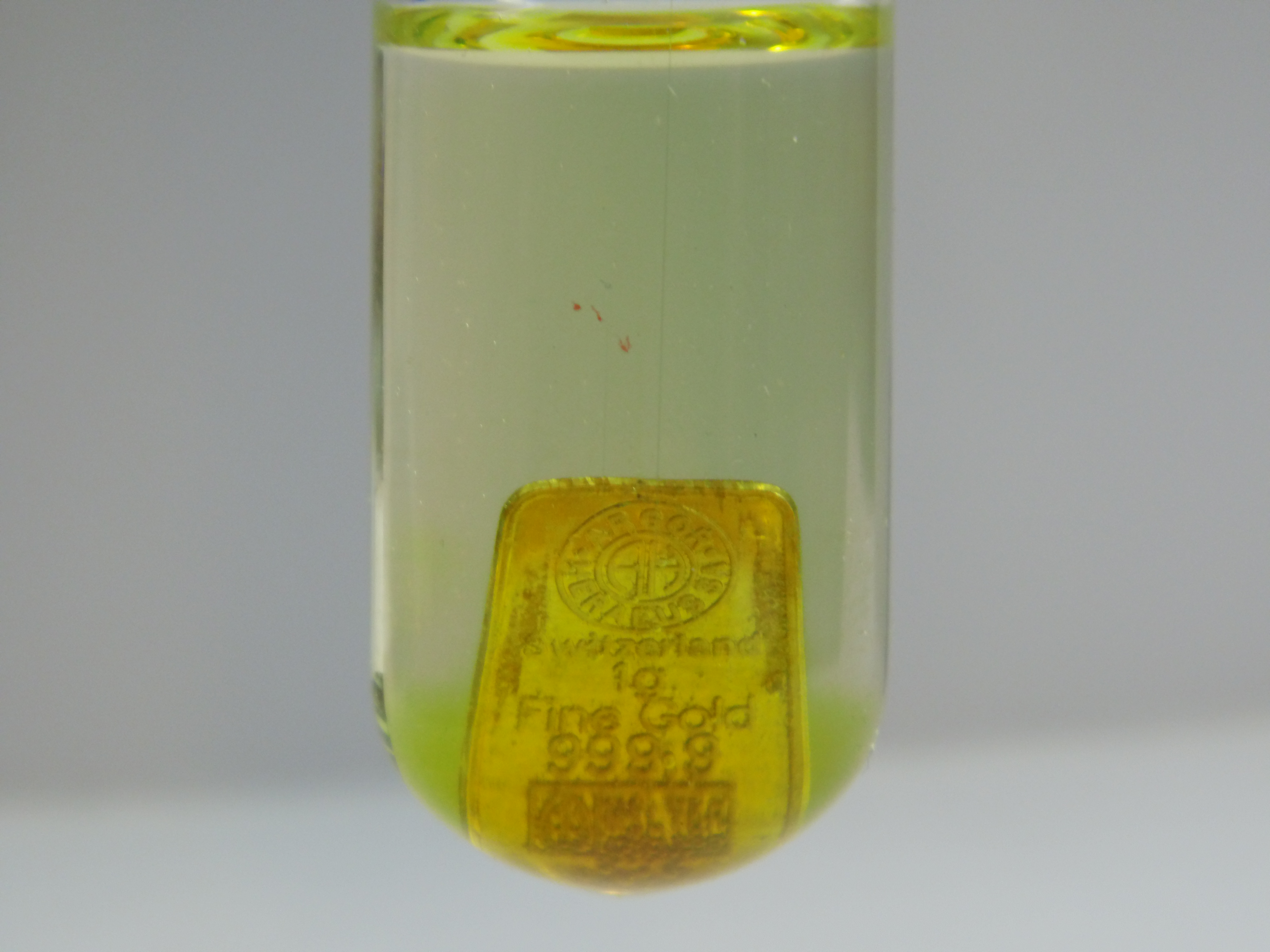
Initial state of the transformation.

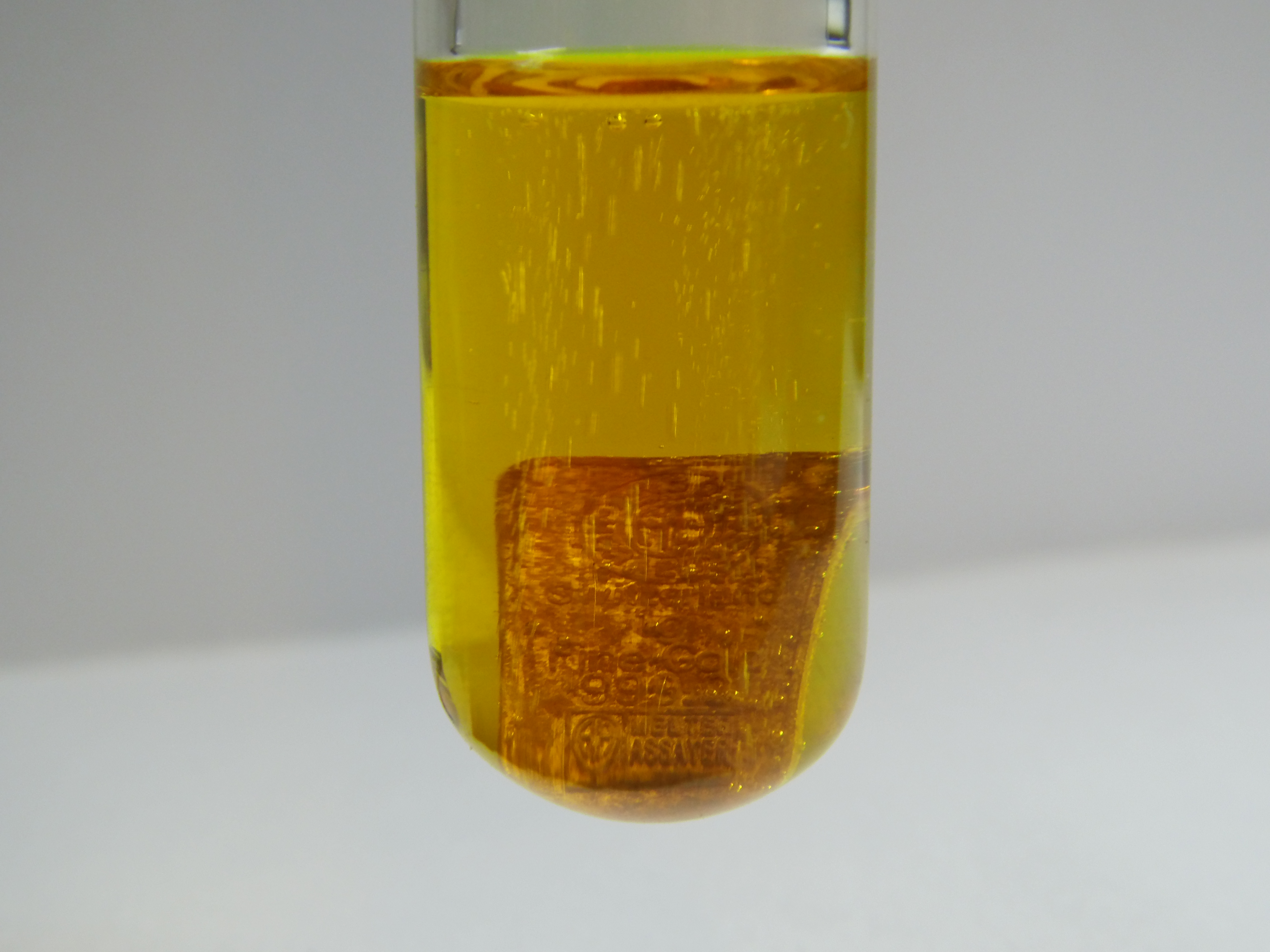
Intermediate state of the transformation.

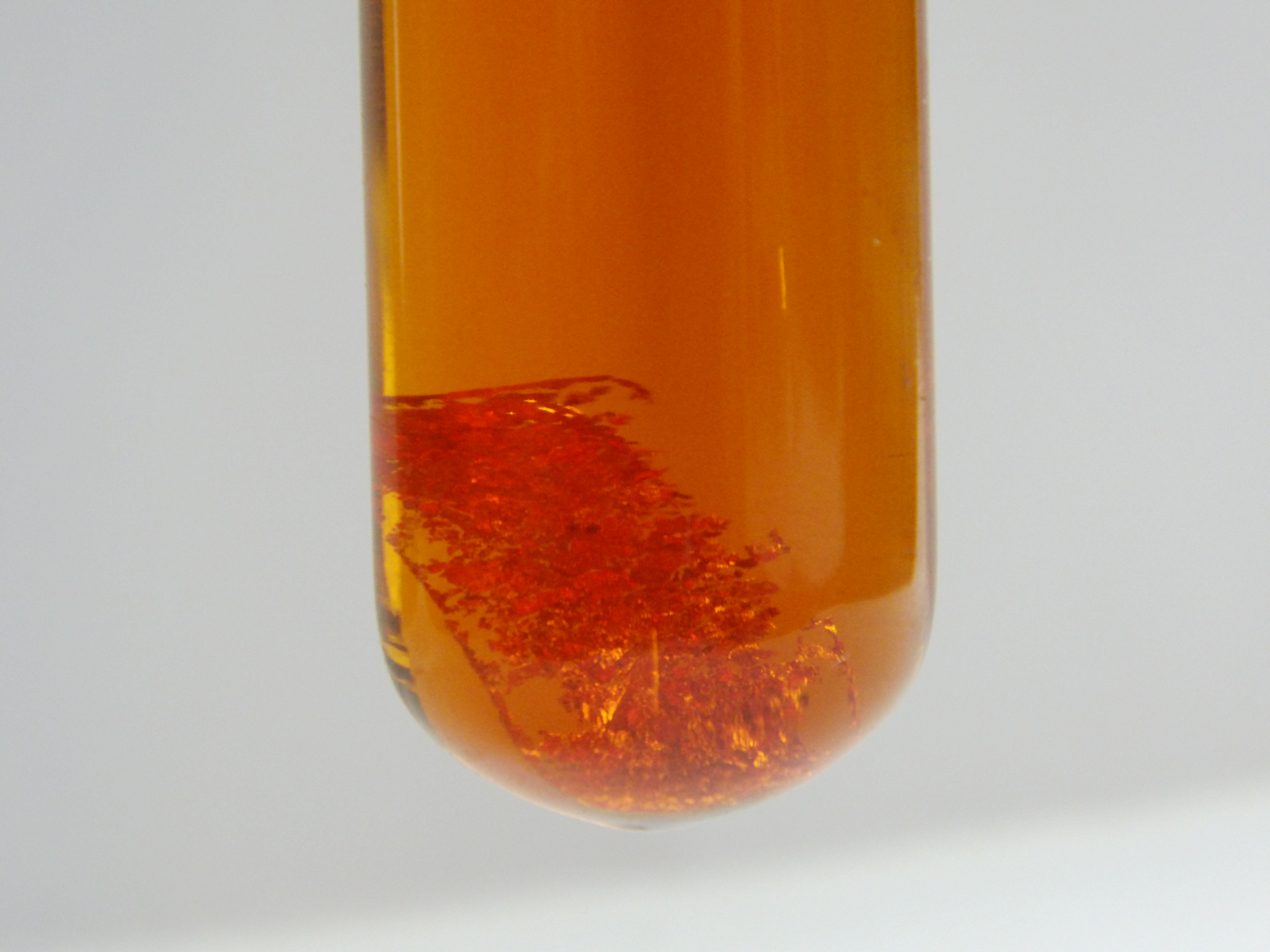
Final state of the transformation.

Click on images to enlarge

=== Dissolving platinum ===
Similar equations can be written for platinum. As with gold, the oxidation reaction can be written with either nitric oxide or nitrogen dioxide as the nitrogen oxide product:

Pt(s) + 4 NO^{−}_{3}(aq) + 8 H^{+}(aq) → Pt^{4+}(aq) + 4 NO_{2}(g) + 4 H_{2}O(l)
3 Pt(s) + 4 NO^{−}_{3}(aq) + 16 H^{+}(aq) → 3 Pt^{4+}(aq) + 4 NO(g) + 8 H_{2}O(l)

The oxidized platinum ion then reacts with chloride ions resulting in the chloroplatinate ion:

Pt^{4+}(aq) + 6 Cl^{−}(aq) → [PtCl_{6}]^{2−}(aq)

Experimental evidence reveals that the reaction of platinum with aqua regia is considerably more complex. The initial reactions produce a mixture of chloroplatinous acid (H_{2}[PtCl_{4}]) and nitrosoplatinic chloride ([NO]_{2}[PtCl_{4}]). The nitrosoplatinic chloride is a solid product. If full dissolution of the platinum is desired, repeated extractions of the residual solids with concentrated hydrochloric acid must be performed:

2 Pt(s) + 2 HNO_{3}(aq) + 8 HCl(aq) → [NO]_{2}[PtCl_{4}](s) + H_{2}[PtCl_{4}](aq) + 4 H_{2}O(l)

and

[NO]_{2}[PtCl_{4}](s) + 2 HCl(aq) ⇌ H_{2}[PtCl_{4}](aq) + 2 NOCl(g)

The chloroplatinous acid can be oxidized to chloroplatinic acid by saturating the solution with molecular chlorine (Cl_{2}) while heating:

H_{2}[PtCl_{4}](aq) + Cl_{2}(g) → H_{2}[PtCl_{6}](aq)

Dissolving platinum solids in aqua regia was the mode of discovery for the densest naturally-occurring metals, iridium and osmium, both of which are found in platinum ores and are not dissolved by aqua regia, instead collecting as insoluble metallic powder (elemental Ir, Os) on the base of the vessel.

Dissolution of platinum (Note: A platinum Soviet commemorative coin to be precise.) by aqua regia.

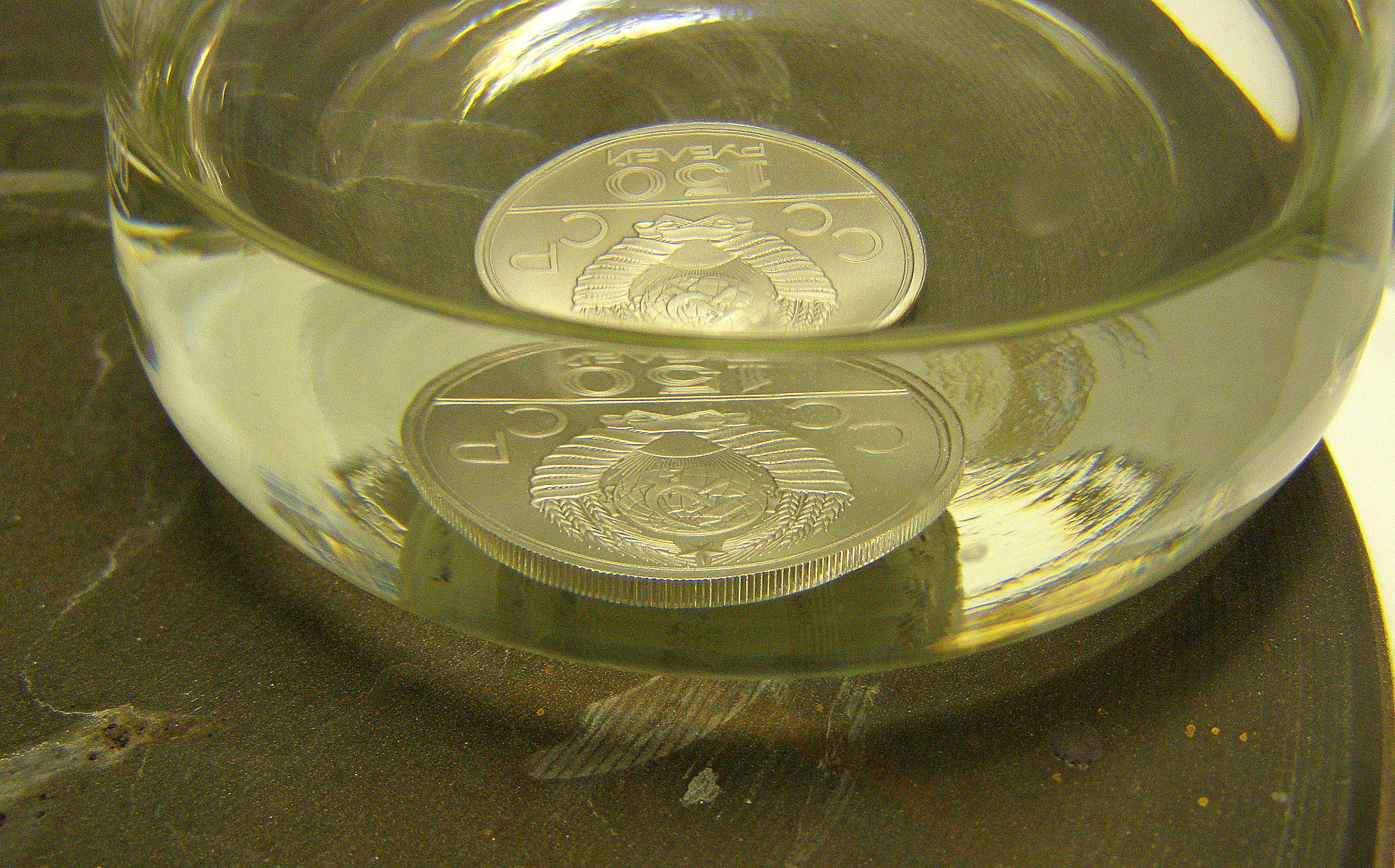
Initial state of the transformation.

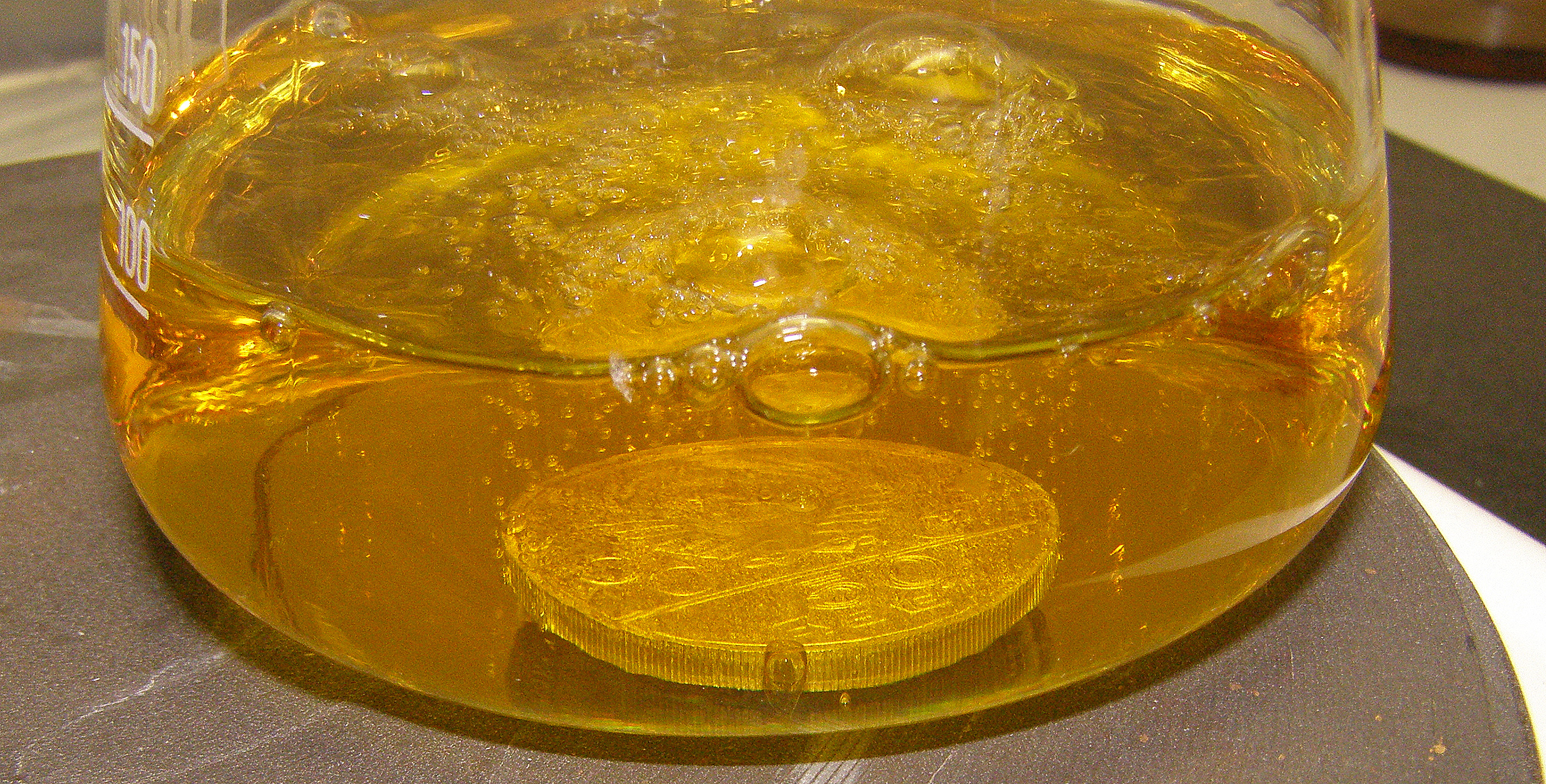
Intermediate state of the transformation.

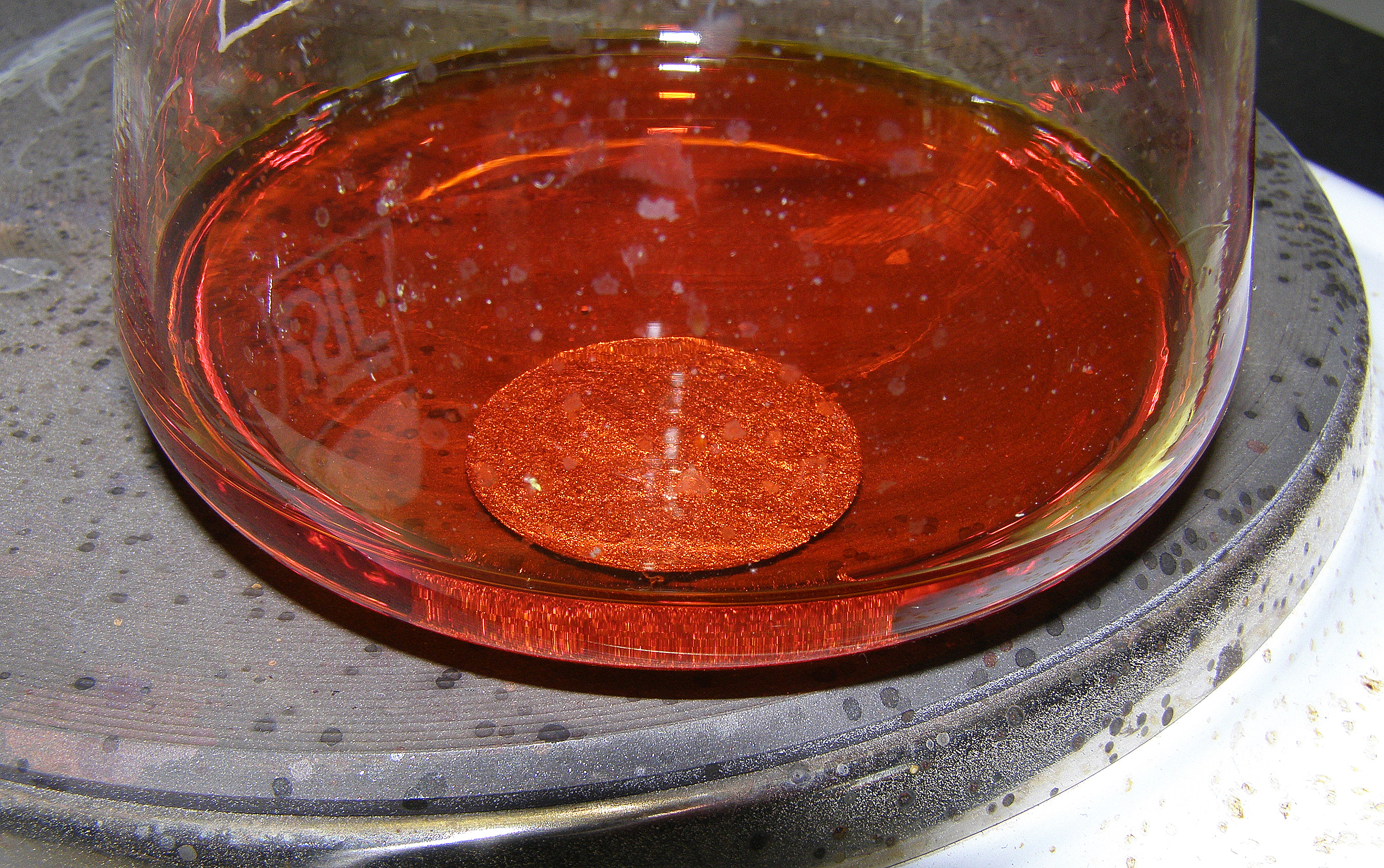
Final state of the transformation
(four days later).

Click on images to enlarge

=== Precipitating dissolved platinum ===
As a practical matter, when platinum group metals are purified through dissolution in aqua regia, gold (commonly associated with PGMs) is precipitated by treatment with iron(II) chloride. Platinum in the filtrate, as hexachloroplatinate(IV), is converted to ammonium hexachloroplatinate by the addition of ammonium chloride. This ammonium salt is extremely insoluble, and it can be filtered off. Ignition (strong heating) converts it to platinum metal:

3 [NH_{4}]_{2}[PtCl_{6}] → 3 Pt + 2 N_{2} + 2 [NH_{4}]Cl + 16 HCl

Unprecipitated hexachloroplatinate(IV) is reduced with elemental zinc, and a similar method is suitable for small scale recovery of platinum from laboratory residues.

=== Reaction with tin ===
Aqua regia reacts with tin to form tin(IV) chloride, containing tin in its highest oxidation state:

4 HCl + 2 HNO_{3} + Sn → SnCl_{4} + NO_{2} + NO + 3 H_{2}O

=== Reaction with other substances ===
Aqua regia can react with iron pyrite to form iron(III) chloride:

FeS_{2} + 5 HNO_{3} + 3 HCl → FeCl_{3} + 2 H_{2}SO_{4} + 5 NO + 2 H_{2}O

== History ==
According to the British historian of science Joseph Needham, records of nitrate being used to make aqua regia appear in the Hsin Hsiu Pên Tshao by 660 AD.

In Europe, aqua regia first appeared in the De inventione veritatis ("On the Discovery of Truth") by pseudo-Geber (after c. 1300), who produced it by adding sal ammoniac (ammonium chloride) to nitric acid. (Note: However, Ahmad Y. Al-Hassan (2005) claimed that Islamic texts dated to before the 13th century, including the works of Jabir ibn Hayyan and Abu Bakr al-Razi, did in fact contain detailed descriptions of aqua regia.) The preparation of aqua regia by directly mixing hydrochloric acid with nitric acid only became possible after the discovery in the late sixteenth century of the process by which free hydrochloric acid can be produced.

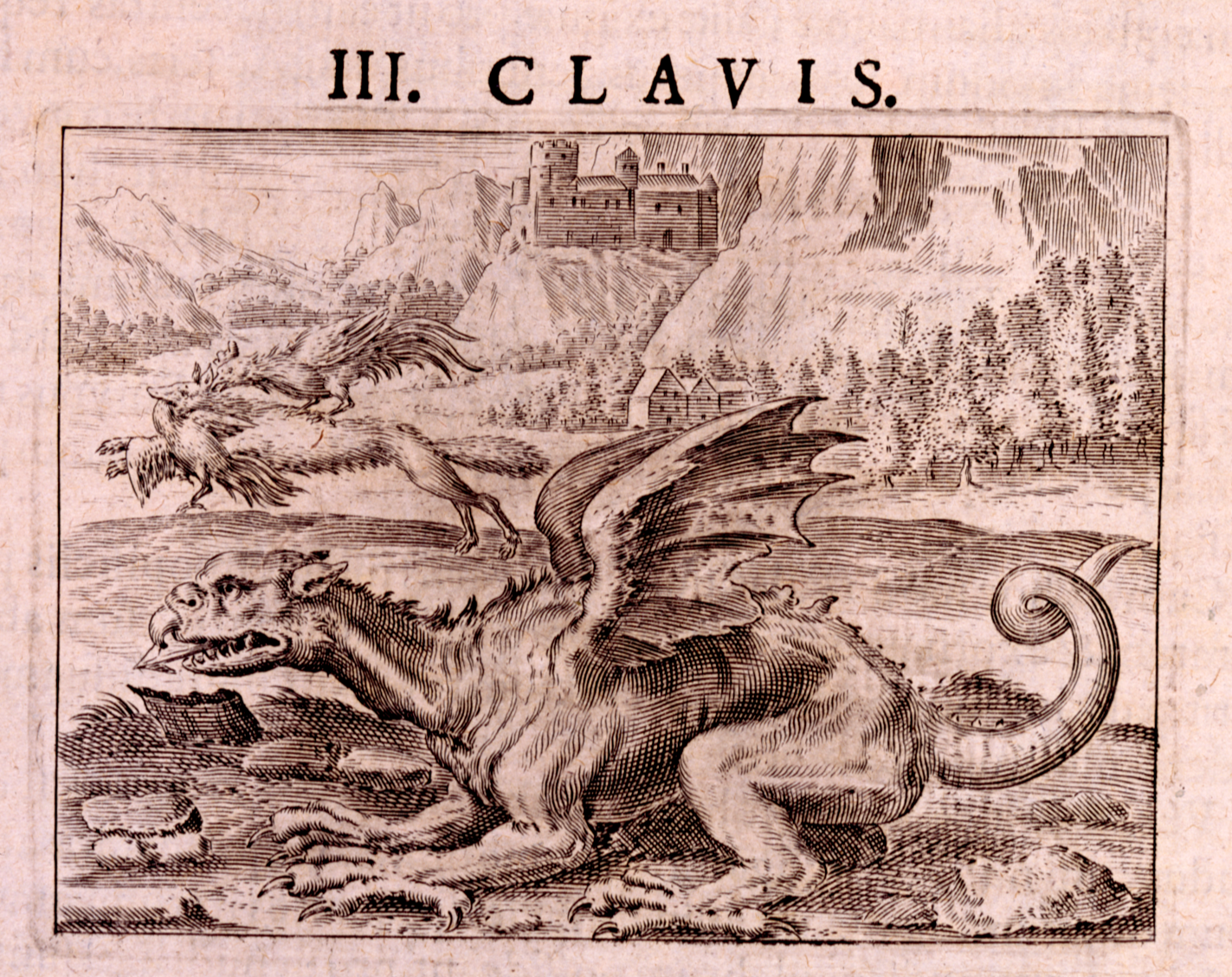
The fox in Basil Valentine's Third Key represents aqua regia, Musaeum Hermeticum, 1678

The third of Basil Valentine's keys (c. 1600) shows a dragon in the foreground and a fox eating a rooster in the background. The rooster symbolizes gold (from its association with sunrise and the sun's association with gold), and the fox represents aqua regia. The repetitive dissolving, heating, and redissolving (the rooster eating the fox eating the rooster) leads to the buildup of chlorine gas in the flask. The gold then crystallizes in the form of gold(III) chloride, whose red crystals Basil called "the rose of our masters" and "the red dragon's blood". The reaction was not reported again in the chemical literature until 1895.

Antoine Lavoisier called aqua regia nitro-muriatic acid in 1789.

When Germany invaded Denmark in World War II, Hungarian chemist George de Hevesy dissolved the gold Nobel Prizes of German physicists Max von Laue (1914) and James Franck (1925) in aqua regia to prevent the Nazis from confiscating them. The German government had prohibited Germans from accepting or keeping any Nobel Prize after jailed peace activist Carl von Ossietzky had received the Nobel Peace Prize in 1935. De Hevesy placed the resulting solution on a shelf in his laboratory at the Niels Bohr Institute. It was subsequently ignored by the Nazis who thought the jar—one of perhaps hundreds on the shelving—contained common chemicals. After the war, de Hevesy returned to find the solution undisturbed and precipitated the gold out of the acid. The gold was returned to the Royal Swedish Academy of Sciences and the Nobel Foundation. They re-cast the medals and again presented them to Laue and Franck.

== See also ==
- Green death – Aggressive solution used to test the resistance of metals to corrosion
- Piranha solution – Oxidizing acid mixture containing sulfuric acid and hydrogen peroxide sometimes also used to clean glassware
