= Piranha solution =

Oxidizing acid mixture containing sulfuric acid and hydrogen peroxide

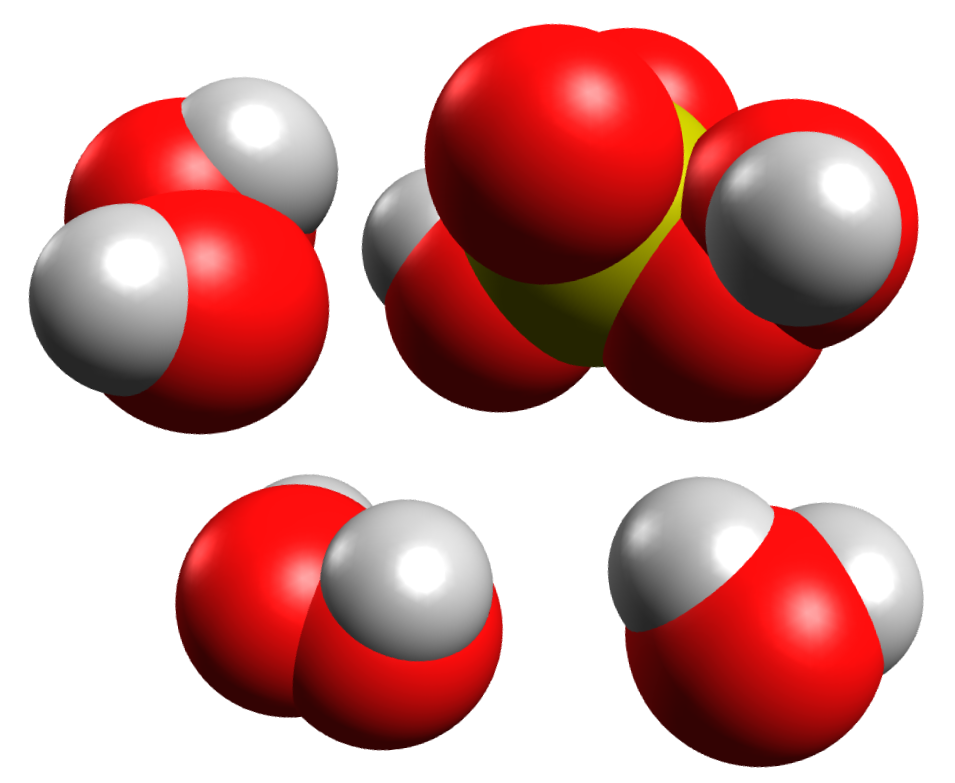
Molecular models of the different molecules in piranha solution: peroxysulfuric acid (H_{2}SO_{5}), hydrogen peroxide (H_{2}O_{2}) and water (H_{2}O).

Piranha solution, which contains but is not to be confused with Caro's acid, also known as piranha etch, is a mixture of sulfuric acid (H_{2}SO_{4}) and hydrogen peroxide (H_{2}O_{2}). The resulting mixture is used to clean organic residues off substrates, for example silicon wafers. Because the mixture is a strong oxidizing agent, it will decompose most organic matter, and it will also hydroxylate most surfaces (by adding –OH groups), making them highly hydrophilic (water-compatible). This means the solution can also easily dissolve fabric and skin, potentially causing severe damage and chemical burns in case of inadvertent contact. It is named after the piranha fish due to its tendency to rapidly dissolve and 'consume' organic materials through vigorous chemical reactions.

== Preparation and use ==
Many different mixture ratios are commonly used, and all are called piranha. A typical mixture is 3 parts of concentrated sulfuric acid and 1 part of 30 wt. % hydrogen peroxide solution; other protocols may use a 4:1 or even 7:1 mixture. A closely related mixture, sometimes called "base piranha", is a 5:1:1 mixture of water, ammonia solution (NH_{4}OH, or NH_{3}(aq)), and 30% hydrogen peroxide. As hydrogen peroxide is less stable at high pH than under acidic conditions, NH_{4}OH (pH c. 11.6) also accelerates its decomposition. At higher pH, H_{2}O_{2} will decompose violently.

Piranha solution must be prepared with great care. It is highly corrosive and an extremely powerful oxidizer. Surfaces must be reasonably clean and completely free of organic solvents from previous washing steps before coming into contact with the solution. Piranha solution cleans by decomposing organic contaminants, and a large amount of contaminant will cause violent bubbling and a release of gas that can cause an explosion.

Piranha solution should always be prepared by adding hydrogen peroxide to sulfuric acid slowly, never in reverse order. This minimises the concentration of hydrogen peroxide during the mixing process, helping to reduce instantaneous heat generation and explosion risk. Mixing the solution is an extremely exothermic process. If the solution is made rapidly, it will instantly boil, releasing large amounts of corrosive fumes. Even when made with care, the resulting heat can easily bring the solution temperature above 100 °C. It must be allowed to cool reasonably before it is used. A sudden increase in temperature can also lead to a violent boiling of the extremely acidic solution. Solutions made using hydrogen peroxide at concentrations greater than 50 wt % may cause an explosion. The 1:1 acid–peroxide mixtures will also create an explosion risk even when using common 30 wt. % hydrogen peroxide.

Once the mixture has stabilized, it can be further heated to sustain its reactivity. The hot (often bubbling) solution cleans organic compounds off substrates and oxidizes or hydroxylates most metal surfaces. Cleaning usually requires about 10 to 40 minutes, after which the substrates can be removed from the solution and rinsed with deionized water.

The solution may be mixed before application or directly applied to the material, applying the sulfuric acid first, followed by the peroxide. Due to the self-decomposition of hydrogen peroxide, piranha solution should always be used freshly prepared (extemporaneous preparation). The solution should not be stored, as it generates gas and therefore cannot be kept in a closed container because of the risk of overpressure and explosion. As the solution violently reacts with many oxidizable substances commonly disposed of as chemical waste, if the solution has not yet been completely self-decomposed, or safely neutralized, it must be left in an open container under a fume hood, and clearly marked.

== Applications ==
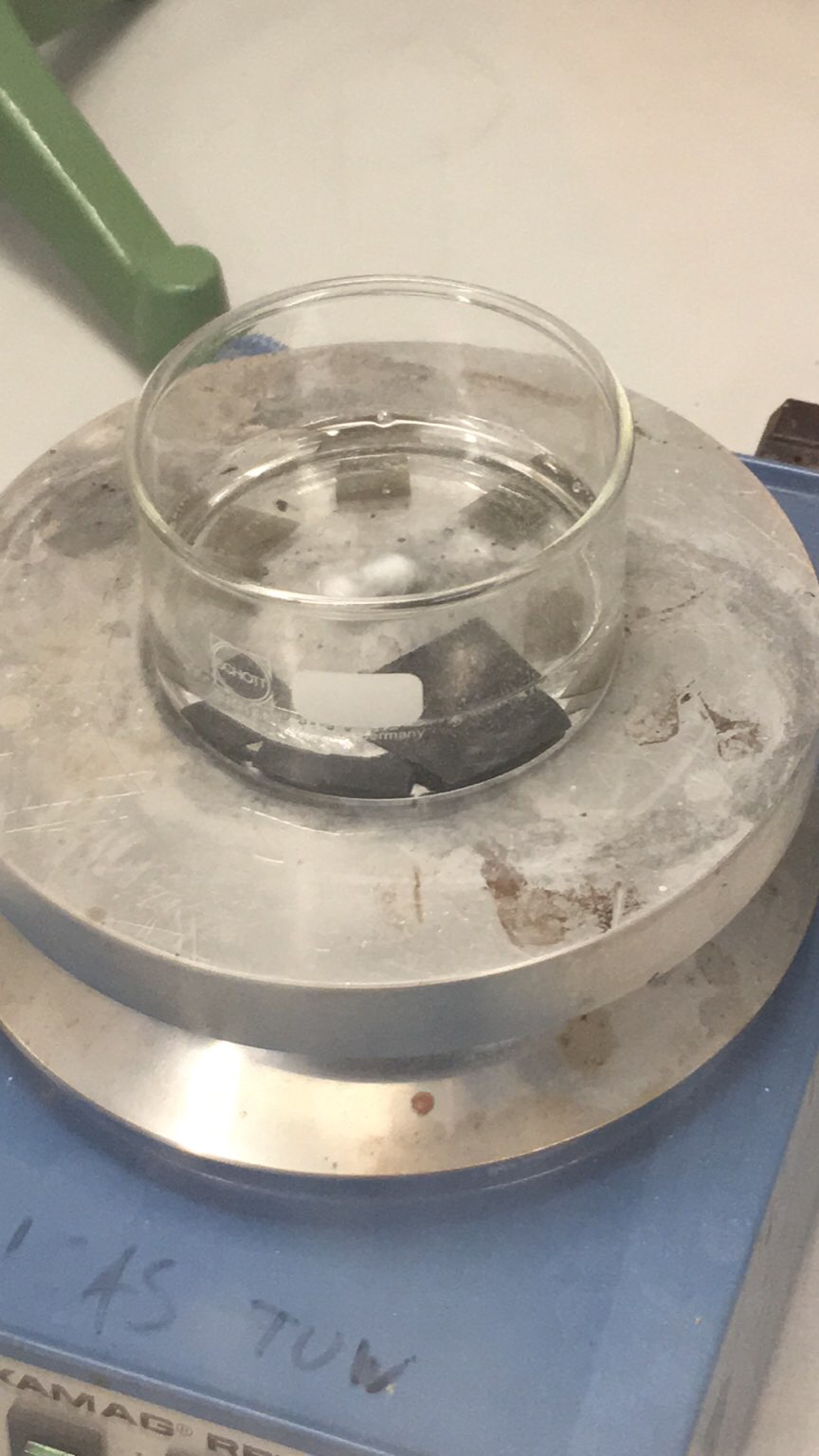
Fragments of silicon wafer immersed in a piranha solution for cleaning their surfaces. One can see bubbles of gaseous O_{2} formed by the coalescence of nascent atomic oxygen produced by the reaction between hydrogen peroxide and sulfuric acid.

Piranha solution is used frequently in the microelectronics industry, e.g. to clean photoresist or organic material residue from silicon wafers. It is also widely employed in wet etching of wafers in the semiconductor fabrication process.

In the laboratory, this solution is sometimes used to clean glassware, though it is discouraged in many institutions and it should not be used routinely due to its dangers. Unlike chromic acid solutions, piranha does not contaminate glassware with Cr^{3+} ions.

Piranha solution is particularly useful when cleaning sintered (or "fritted") glass filters. A good porosity and sufficient permeability of the sintered glass filter is critical for its proper function, so it should never be cleaned with strong bases (NaOH, Na_{3}PO_{4}, Na_{2}CO_{3}, ...) which dissolve the silica of the glass sinter and clog the filter. Sintered glass also tends to trap small solid particles deep inside its porous structure, making it difficult to remove them. Where less aggressive cleaning methods fail, piranha solution can be used to return the sinter to a pristine white, free-flowing form without excessive damage to the pore dimensions. This is usually achieved by allowing the solution to percolate backwards through the sintered glass. Although cleaning sintered glass with piranha solution will leave it as clean as possible without damaging the glass, it is not recommended due to the risk of explosion from reacting with traces of organic compounds, such as acetone.

Piranha solution is also used to make glass more hydrophilic by hydroxylating its surface, thus increasing the number of silanol groups present on its surface.

== Mechanism ==
The effectiveness of piranha solution in decomposing organic residues is due to two distinct processes operating at noticeably different rates. The first and faster process is the removal of hydrogen and oxygen as units of water by the concentrated sulfuric acid. This occurs because hydration of concentrated sulfuric acid is strongly thermodynamically favorable, with a standard enthalpy of reaction (ΔH) of −880 kJ/mol. The dehydration process exhibits itself as the rapid carbonization of common organic materials, especially carbohydrates, when they enter in contact with sulfuric acid.

$$\underset{\text{polysaccharide}}{\ce{[C6H10O5]}_n} \longrightarrow 6n\ \ce{C} + 5n\ \ce{H2O}$$

With respect to organic residues such as thin films or wax, this results in the formation of carbon compounds rich in C=C double bonds.

Simultaneously, sulfuric acid reacts with hydrogen peroxide to produce Caro's acid, which then undergoes homeolytic cleavage to produce oxygen-based radicals. Thus, with the addition of sulfuric acid, hydrogen peroxide is converted from a relatively mild oxidizing agent into one sufficiently aggressive to dissolve elemental carbon, a material that is notoriously resistant to room-temperature aqueous reactions (as, e.g., with sulfochromic acid). This transformation can also be viewed as the energetically favorable dehydration of hydrogen peroxide by concentrated sulfuric acid to form hydronium ions, bisulfate ions, and, transiently, atomic oxygen radicals (very labile O^{•}):

H_{2}SO_{4} + H_{2}O_{2} ⇌ H_{2}SO_{5} (Caro's acid) + H_{2}O
H_{2}SO_{5} → HSO_{3}O• + •OH
H_{2}SO_{4} + H_{2}O_{2} → [H_{3}O]^{+} + HSO^{−}_{4} + O^{•}

The resulting oxyradicals then interact with carbon-based compounds, generating alkyl radicals while breaking C–H and C–C bonds:

RH + HSO_{3}O• → R• + H_{2}SO_{4}
RCH_{2}R + •OH → R• + H_{2}O

Finally, the alkyl radicals react with additional oxygen radicals, terminating the reaction and fully oxidizing the carbon to CO2:

•R + •O → CO
•R + •O → CO_{2}

The carbon removed by the piranha solution may be either original residues or char from the dehydration step. The oxidation process is slower than the dehydration process, taking place over a period of minutes. The oxidation of carbon exhibits itself as a gradual clearing of suspended soot and carbon char left by the initial dehydration process. With time, piranha solutions in which organic materials have been immersed typically return to complete clarity, with no visible traces of the original organic materials remaining.

A last secondary contribution to the piranha solution cleaning is its high acidity, which dissolves deposits such as metal oxides, hydroxides, and carbonates. However, since it is safer and easier to remove such deposits using milder acids, the solution is more typically used in situations where high acidity facilitates cleaning instead of complicating it. For substrates with low tolerance for acidity, an alkaline solution consisting of ammonium hydroxide and hydrogen peroxide, known as base piranha, is preferred.

== Etymology ==
Piranha solution is named after the piranha fish. This is due to the vigor of the dehydration process, as large quantities of organic residues become dehydrated so violently when immersed in the solution, that the process is said to resemble the fish's reputed feeding frenzy. The second and more definitive rationale for the name, however, is the dissolution ability of piranha solution, capable of "eating anything", especially elemental carbon in the form of soot or char.

== Safety and disposal ==
Piranha solution is dangerous to handle, being both strongly acidic and a strong oxidizer. Solution that is no longer being used should never be left unattended if hot. It should never be stored in a closed receptacle because of the risk of gas overpressure and explosive burst with spills (especially with fragile thin wall volumetric flask). Piranha solution should never be disposed of with organic solvents (e.g. in waste-solvent carboys), as this will cause a violent reaction and a substantial explosion, and any aqueous waste container containing even a weak or depleted piranha solution should be labelled appropriately to prevent this.

The solution should be allowed to cool, and oxygen gas should be allowed to dissipate prior to disposal. When cleaning glassware, it is both prudent and practical to allow the piranha solution to react overnight taking care to leave the receptacles open under a ventilated fume cupboard. This allows the spent solution to degrade prior to disposal and is especially important if a large portion of peroxide was used in the preparation. While some institutions believe that used piranha solution should be collected as hazardous waste, others consider that it can be neutralized and poured down the drain with copious amounts of water. Improper neutralization can cause a fast decomposition, which releases pure oxygen (increased risk of fire of flammable substances in a close space).

One procedure for acid-base neutralization consists of pouring the piranha solution into a sufficiently large glass container filled with at least five times the solution's mass of ice (for cooling the exothermic reaction, and for dilution purposes), then slowly adding 1M sodium or potassium hydroxide solution until neutralized. If ice is not available then the piranha solution can be added very slowly to a saturated solution of sodium bicarbonate in a large glass container, with a large amount of undissolved bicarbonate at the bottom that is renewed if it is depleted. The bicarbonate method also releases a large amount of gaseous CO_{2} and therefore is not preferred since it can easily overflow with a lot of foam if the addition of the piranha solution is not slow enough, and without cooling the solution can also become very hot.

== See also ==
- Aqua regia (HNO_{3} + 3 HCl)
- Chromic acid (H_{2}CrO_{4})
- Chlorine trifluoride ClF_{3} (An even more dangerous substance also used in semiconductor manufacture)
- Fenton's reagent (H_{2}O_{2} + Fe^{2+})
- Green death (xH_{2}SO_{4} + yHCl + zFeCl_{3} + wCuCl_{2})
- Peroxydisulfuric acid, or Marshall's acid (H_{2}S_{2}O_{8})
- Peroxymonosulfuric acid, or Caro's acid (H_{2}SO_{5})
- Plasma etching
- RCA clean (silicon wafer cleaning procedure)
- Superhydrophilicity
- Ultrahydrophobicity
