= Fritted glass =

Finely porous glass permeable to fluids

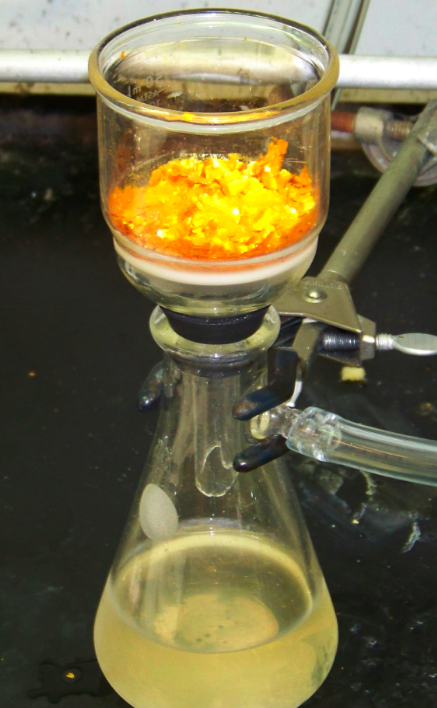
A sintered glass filter connected to a Büchner flask

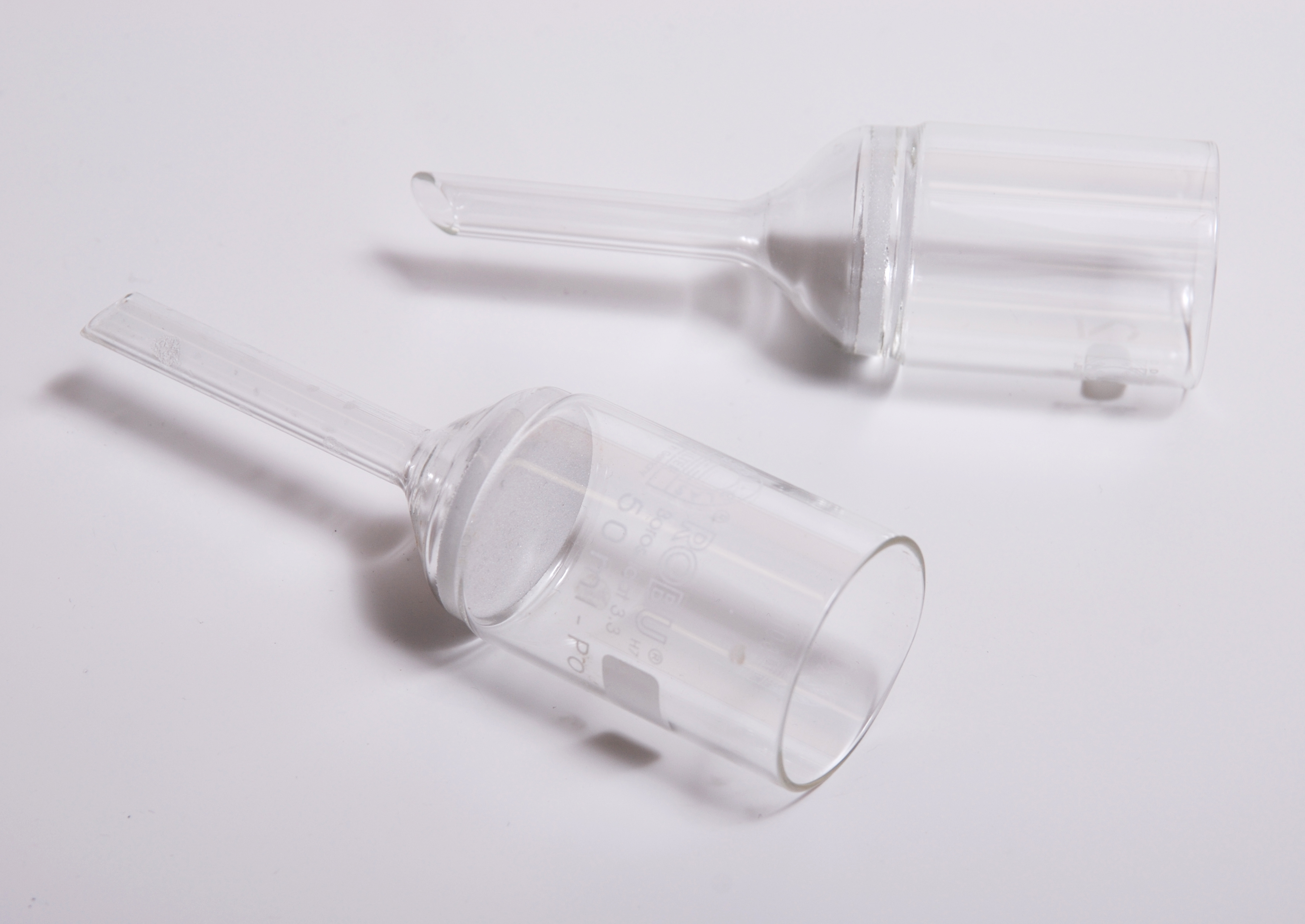
Fritted glass funnels

Fritted glass is finely porous glass through which gas or liquid may pass, made by sintering together glass particles into a solid but porous body. This porous glass body can also be called a frit. Applications in laboratory glassware include use in fritted glass filter items, scrubbers, or spargers. Other laboratory applications of fritted glass include packing in chromatography columns and resin beds for special chemical synthesis.

In a fritted glass filter, a disc or pane of fritted glass is used to filter out solid particles, precipitate, or residue from a fluid, similar to a piece of filter paper. The fluid can go through the pores in the fritted glass, but the frit will often stop a solid from going through. A fritted filter is often part of a glassware item, so fritted glass funnels and fritted glass crucibles are available.

Laboratory scale spargers (also known as gas diffusing stones or diffusors) as well as scrubbers, and gas-washing bottles (or Drechsel bottles) are similar glassware items which may use a fritted glass piece fused to the tip of a gas-inlet tube. This fritted glass tip is placed inside the vessel with liquid inside during use such that the fritted tip is submerged in the liquid. To maximize surface area contact of the gas to the liquid, a stream of gaseous particles is slowly blown into the vessel through the fritted glass tip so that it breaks up the gas into many tiny bubbles. The purpose of sparging is to saturate the enclosed liquid with the gas, often to displace another gaseous component. The purpose of a scrubber or gas-washing bottle is to scrub the gas such that the liquid absorbs one (or more) of the gaseous components to remove it from the gas stream, effectively purifying the gas stream.

Glass frit products are not recommended for strongly alkaline solutions which can sometimes attack laboratory glass. Although such solutions only dissolve a negligible layer from the surface of ordinary labware, because frit particles are small, they expose a much larger surface area to the solution, and have tiny particle-contact areas vunerable to attack, resulting in gradual loss of particles.
