= Parafilm =

Wrapping plastic often used in chemistry

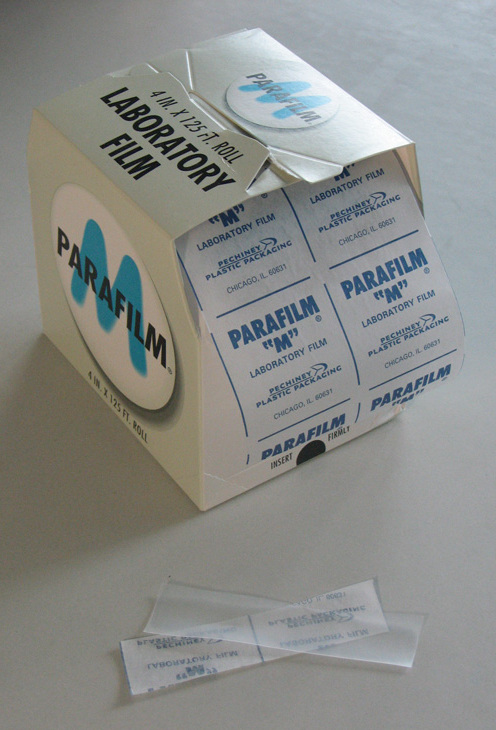
A carton box with Parafilm.

Parafilm is a semi-transparent, flexible film composed of a blend of waxes and polyolefins. It is a ductile, malleable, non-toxic, tasteless, odorless, and self-sealing thermoplastic. It has been manufactured by the company Amcor since its acquisition of Bemis Company, Inc in 2018. It comes in two colors, natural (colorless) and purple.

== Laboratories ==
Parafilm M is commonly used in health care, pharmaceutical and research laboratories for covering or sealing vessels such as flasks, cuvettes, test tubes, beakers, petri dishes and more. The "M" stands for mounting or maps, as Parafilm was originally used to mount charts and other objects using heat. Parafilm M was marketed in 1950s for lab use and for various home applications.

Because it melts quickly when heated, Parafilm M is not safe for use in an autoclave. It is also soluble in many organic solvents.

== Other applications ==
=== Produce ===
Some growers use Parafilm M instead of fungicides or other coatings to prevent rot, wrapping it around the freshly cut crowns of bananas, pineapples and other produce.

=== Stem wrap ===
Florists use Parafilm Stem Wrap to extend the flower's life by protecting moisture in the stem as a floral tape.

=== Grafting ===
Horticulturalists use Parafilm Grafting Tape in grafting. Several grafting styles call for wrapping a graft to hold it together, and sealing it to prevent drying and Parafilm Grafting Tape does both. In this context Parafilm is also known as grafting tape.

=== Modeling ===
Parafilm M is used by some modelers as a masking material during airbrushing, due to its lack of adhesion, which can destroy a finish.

=== Entomology ===
Entomologists have used Parafilm M as a membrane to feed hematophagous insects such as mosquitoes and bedbugs reared in the lab.

=== Microfluidics ===
An application of Parafilm M is to make paper-based microfluidic devices. Paper-based microfluidic devices are considered a suitable way to fabricate low-cost point-of-care diagnostics for developing countries and areas where expensive medical instrumentation is not accessible. Digital microfluidic devices can also use it as the electrode insulator and hydrophobic layer

== Similar products ==
A similar but now discontinued product is Fuji's Sealon film.

Another similar product is Seal-R-Film.

== See also ==
- Plastic wrap
