= Potassium hexachloroosmate =

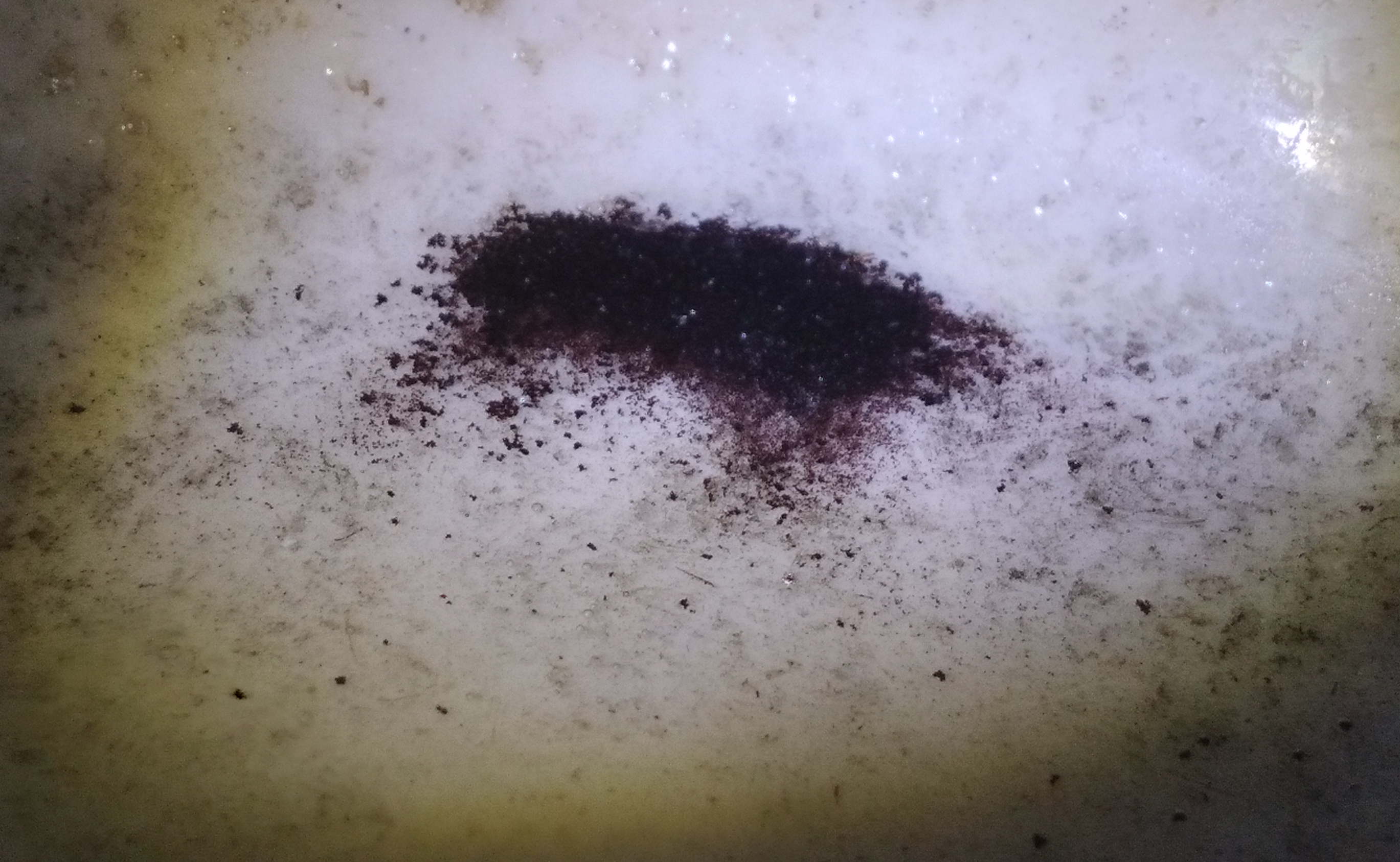
- K_{2}OsCl_{6} in an evaporating dish

Identifiers
CAS Number	16871-60-6
3D model (JSmol)	Interactive image
ChemSpider	19990460
ECHA InfoCard	100.037.160
EC Number	240-893-6
PubChem CID	167580
UNII	3X55YB10CW
CompTox Dashboard (EPA)	DTXSID10276572
- InChI: InChI=1S/6ClH.2K.Os/h6*1H;;;/q;;;;;;2*+1;+4/p-6 Key: VGKQJCSDERXWRV-UHFFFAOYSA-H
- SMILES: [Cl-].[Cl-].[Cl-].[Cl-].[Cl-].[Cl-].[K+].[K+].[Os+4]

Properties
Chemical formula	K_{2}OsCl_{6}
Molar mass	481.13 g/mol
Appearance	Dark red to black solid
Density	2.03 g/cm^{3}
Solubility in water	slightly soluble

Hazards
- GHS labelling
Pictograms	(GHS05: Corrosive) (GHS06: Toxic) (GHS07: Exclamation mark)
Signal word	Danger
Hazard statements	H301, H302, H311, H314, H331, H335
Precautionary statements	P260, P262, P264, P264+P265, P270, P271, P280, P301+P316, P301+P317, P301+P330+P331, P302+P352, P302+P361+P354, P304+P340, P305+P354+P338, P316, P317, P319, P321, P330, P332+P317, P337+P317, P361+P364, P363, P403+P233, P405, P501

Related compounds
Other anions	Potassium hexachloroplatinate, Potassium hexachloropalladate(IV)
Other cations	Sodium hexachloroosmate, Ammonium hexachloroosmate(IV), Hexachloroosmic acid
- Except where otherwise noted, data are given for materials in their standard state (at 25 °C [77 °F], 100 kPa). Infobox references

Potassium hexachloroosmate is an inorganic chemical compound with the chemical formula K_{2}OsCl_{6}. It is a darkly colored solid with limited solubility in water.

== Properties ==
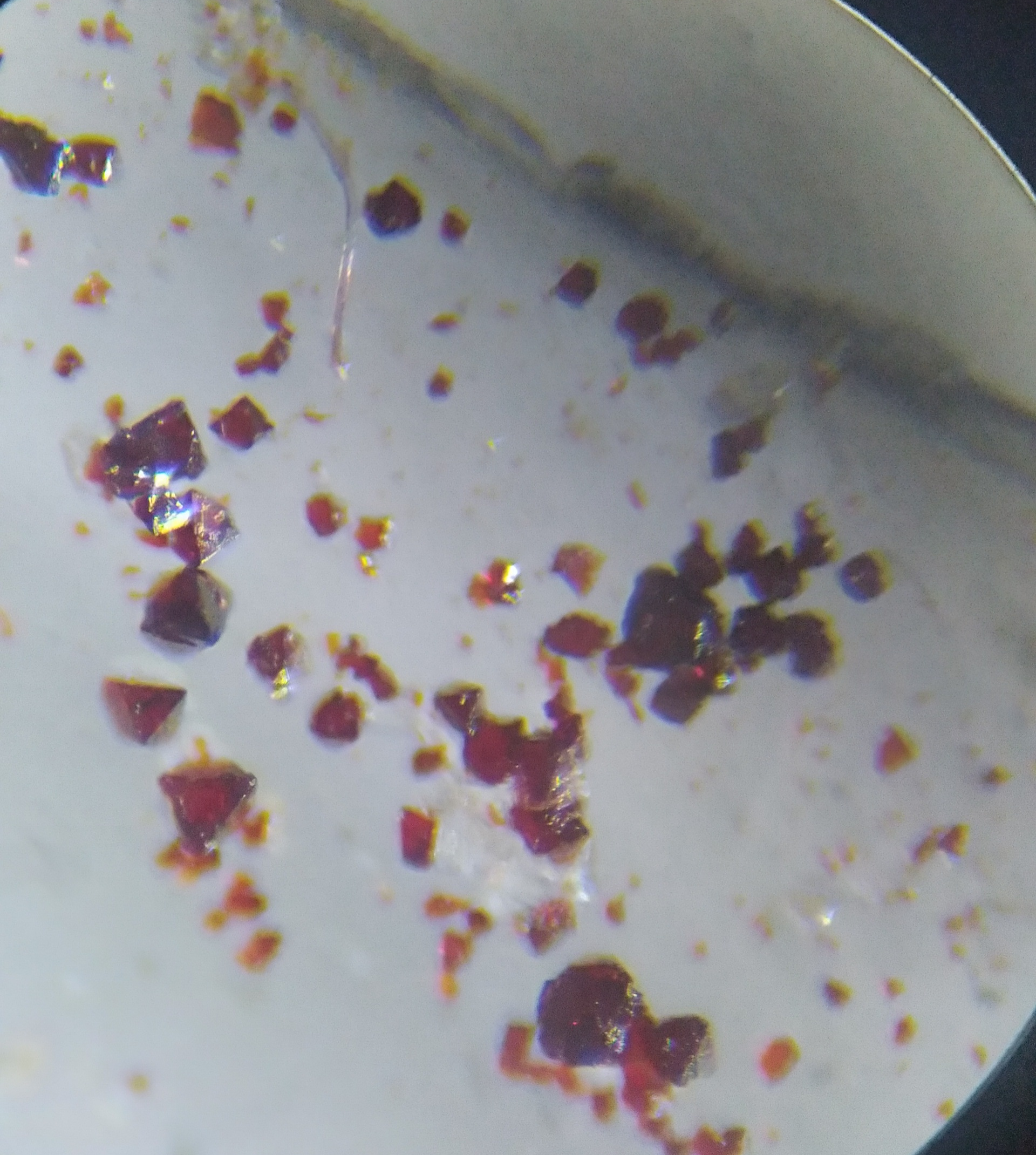
Crystals of K_{2}OsCl_{6} viewed under a microscope

Potassium hexachloroosmate forms dark red octahedral crystals of the space group Fm3̅m, which produce a dark yellow color when dissolved in water. The crystal structure is isomorphic to the corresponding cations of palladium, platinum, and iridium. It is slightly soluble in water, and is insoluble in saline solutions as well as alcohol.

Potassium hexachloroosmate is most stable in acidic solutions, although with nitric acid it reacts to form osmium tetroxide. It slowly hydrolyses in water yielding osmium dioxide, and in strong alkali it also decomposes to the dioxide.

== Synthesis ==
There are several methods for producing potassium hexachloroosmate. The first involves reducing osmium tetroxide to chloroosmic acid with hydrochloric acid and alcohol, followed by addition of potassium chloride.

It can also be obtained by heating finely divided osmium metal with potassium chloride and chlorine.

Addition of potassium chloride to a solution of sodium hexachloroosmate will precipitate this salt, and the last method involves treating potassium osmyl oxynitrite with hydrochloric acid.

== Reactions ==
Potassium hexachloroosmate reacts with a variety of reagents to produce different compounds. It reacts with hydrazine and pyridine to form [Os(NH_{3})_{5}N_{2}]^{2+} and Os(py)_{2}Cl_{4} respectively. When it reacts with a mixture of nitrogen dioxide, nitric oxide, and hydrochloric acid, Os(NO)Cl_{5} is formed. With thiourea it reacts to form the [Os(NH_{2}CSNH_{2})_{6}]Cl_{3} complex, which gives red colored solutions. Sodium phosphate and borax both react with it to yield the dioxide.

The reaction of K_{2}OsCl_{6} with BrF_{3} results in a stepwise substitution.

OsCl^{2−}_{6} → OsCl_{5}F^{2−} → cis-OsCl_{4}F^{2−}_{2} → fac-OsCl_{3}F^{2−}_{3} → cis-OsCl_{2}F^{2−}_{4} → OsClF^{2−}_{5} → OsF^{2−}_{6}

The reaction time determines which isomers are obtained and in which ratio they're present. Advantageously, the stronger trans effect of the chloride ion can yield the following reaction:

cis-OsCl_{2}F^{2−}_{4} → mer-OsCl_{3}F^{2−}_{3}
