= Ammonium hexachloroosmate(IV) =

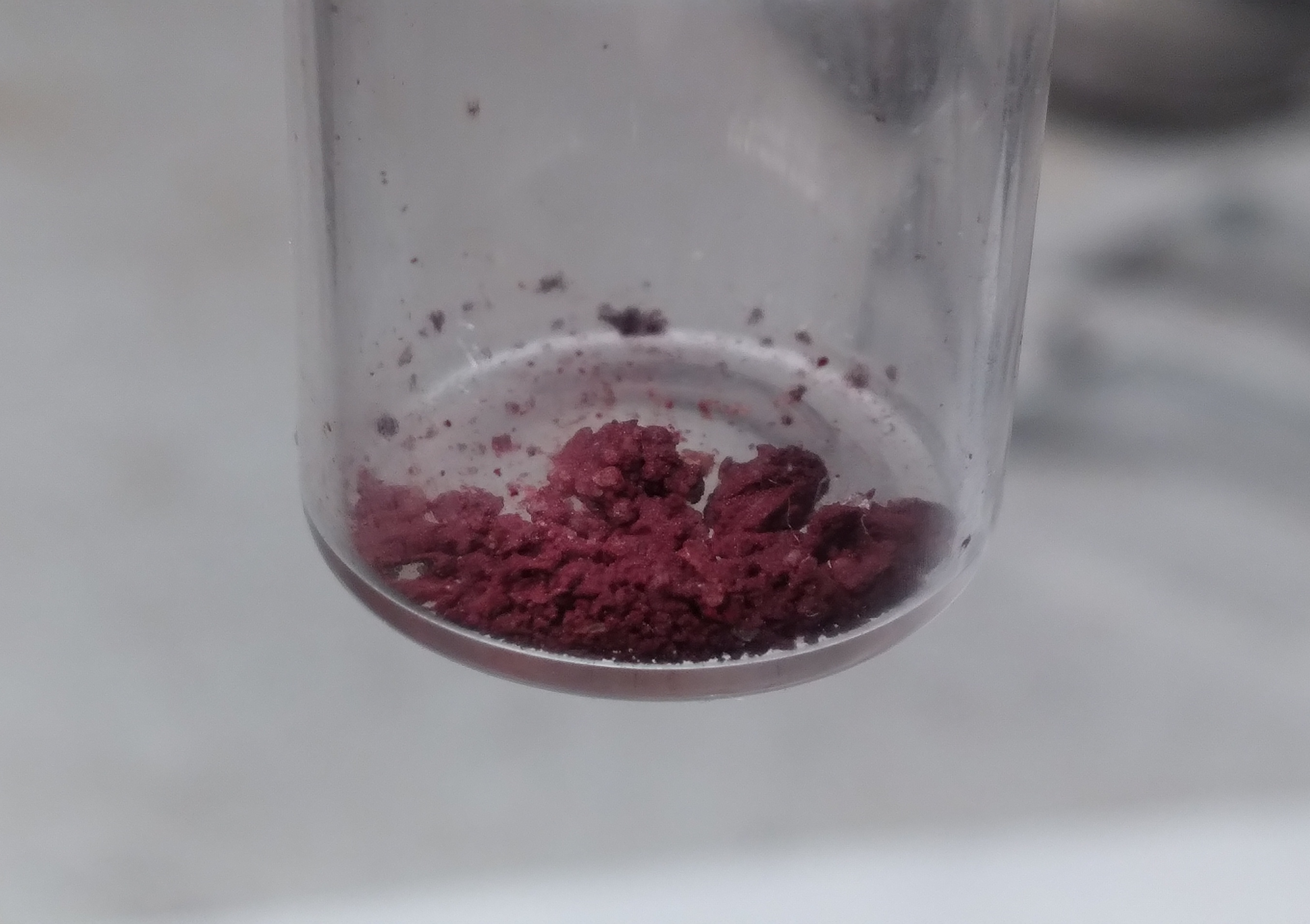

Names
- IUPAC name Ammonium hexachloroosmate(IV)

Identifiers
CAS Number	12125-08-5
3D model (JSmol)	Interactive image
ChemSpider	145801
ECHA InfoCard	100.031.977
EC Number	235-188-5
PubChem CID	11729867
UNII	30S4860S8D
CompTox Dashboard (EPA)	DTXSID70923737
- InChI: InChI=1S/6ClH.2H3N.Os/h6*1H;2*1H3;/q;;;;;;;;+4/p-4 Key: SRBXXQDKBKTWOC-UHFFFAOYSA-J
- SMILES: [NH4+].[NH4+].Cl[Os-2](Cl)(Cl)(Cl)(Cl)Cl

Properties
Chemical formula	Cl_{6}H_{8}N_{2}Os
Molar mass	439.01 g·mol^{−1}
Appearance	Dark red
Density	2.93 g/cm^{3}
Melting point	170
Solubility in water	poorly soluble

Hazards
- GHS labelling
Pictograms	(GHS07: Exclamation mark)
Signal word	Warning

Related compounds
Other anions	Ammonium hexachloroplatinate, Ammonium hexachloropalladate, Ammonium hexachloroiridate, Ammonium hexachlororhodate(III)
Other cations	Sodium hexachloroosmate, Potassium hexachloroosmate, Hexachloroosmic acid
- Except where otherwise noted, data are given for materials in their standard state (at 25 °C [77 °F], 100 kPa). Infobox references

Ammonium hexachloroosmate(IV) is an inorganic chemical compound with the chemical formula (NH_{4})_{2}OsCl_{6}.

== Synthesis ==
Ammonium hexachloroosmate(IV) can be produced by the reduction of osmium tetroxide with iron dichloride in hydrochloric acid in the presence of ammonium ions:

OsO_{4} + 4FeCl_{2} + 8HCl + 2NH_{4}Cl → (NH_{4})_{2}[OsCl_{6}] + 3FeCl_{3} + 4H_{2}O

It can also be prepared by addition of an ammonium chloride solution to hexachloroosmic acid, or by addition of ammonium chloride to a solution of sodium hexachloroosmate.

H_{2}OsCl_{6} + 2NH_{4}Cl → (NH_{4})_{2}OsCl_{6} + 2HCl

== Physical properties ==
Ammonium hexachloroosmate(IV) forms dark red crystals of the cubic system, space group Fm3m, cell parameters a = 0.9729 nm, Z = 4.

It dissolves sparingly in water to form greenish-yellow solutions. It is insoluble in alcohol.

== Chemical properties ==
The compound is reduced by hydrogen to metallic osmium:

3 (NH_{4})_{2}[OsCl_{6}] → 3 Os + 2 N_{2} + 16 HCl + 2 NH_{4}Cl
(NH_{4})_{2}[OsCl_{6}] + 2 H_{2} → Os + 2 NH_{4}Cl + 4 HCl

Ammonium hexachloroosmate is stable in hydrochloric acid, but it is oxidized by nitric acid, forming osmium tetroxide. When exposed to strong alkali, it reacts to produce osmium oxydiammine dihydroxide, OsO(NH_{3})_{2}(OH)_{2}.

It can hydrolyze, whereby it forms osmium dioxide. It can also undergo a reversible aquation, producing the aquopentachloroosmate anion.

[OsCl_{6}]^{2−} + H_{2}O ⇌ [Os(OH_{2})Cl_{5}]^{−} + Cl^{−}

== Reactions ==
Ammonium hexachloroosmate reacts with triphenylphosphine to form various complexes in which osmium is divalent.

(NH_{4})_{2}OsCl_{6} + 4PPh_{3} ^{2-(2-methoxyethoxy)ethanol}_{———————————→} OsHCl(CO)(PPh_{3})_{3} + 2NH_{4}Cl + 2PPh_{3}Cl_{2}

(NH_{4})_{2}OsCl_{6} + 6PPh_{3} ^{2-methoxyethanol}_{———————→} OsH_{2}(CO)(PPh_{3})_{3} + 2NH_{4}Cl + 3PPh_{3}Cl_{2}

It also reacts with triphenylphosphine in a solution of t-butyl alcohol and water to produce OsCl_{2}(PPh_{3})_{3}.

When ammonium hexachloroosmate is refluxed with diethylphenylphosphine, OsCl_{3}(PEt_{2}Ph)_{3} is formed.

It reacts with hydrazine hydrate to form a variety of different products, chief of which are [Os(NH_{3})_{5}(N_{2})]Cl_{2} and [(NH_{3})_{5}OsNOs(NH_{3})_{5}]Cl_{5}•H_{2}O.

== Uses ==
The compound is used as a pharmaceutical, organic, and chemical intermediate.
