= Ammonium hexafluoroplatinate =

Names
- Other names Ammonium hexafluoroplatinate(IV)

Identifiers
3D model (JSmol)	Interactive image
PubChem CID	22238669
- InChI: InChI=1S/6FH.2H3N.Pt/h6*1H;2*1H3;/q;;;;;;;;+4/p-4 Key: XJAQQYJSKDIYFW-UHFFFAOYSA-J
- SMILES: [NH4+].[NH4+].F[Pt-2](F)(F)(F)(F)F

Properties
Chemical formula	F_{6}H_{8}N_{2}Pt
Molar mass	345.152 g·mol^{−1}
Appearance	Pale yellow crystals
Solubility in water	reacts with water

Structure
Crystal structure	cubic
Space group	Fm3m
Lattice constant	a = 8.451 Å, b = 8.451 Å, c = 8.451 Å α = 90°, β = 90°, γ = 90°
Lattice volume (V)	603.6 Å^{3}
Formula units (Z)	4 units per cell

Hazards
- GHS labelling
Pictograms	(GHS05: Corrosive) (GHS06: Toxic) (GHS08: Health hazard) (GHS09: Environmental hazard)
- Except where otherwise noted, data are given for materials in their standard state (at 25 °C [77 °F], 100 kPa). Infobox references

Ammonium hexafluoroplatinate is an inorganic chemical compound with the chemical formula (NH_{4})_{2}PtF_{6}. It forms pale yellow, cubic crystals.

== Synthesis ==
Ammonium hexafluoroplatinate can be prepared by direct fluorination of potassium hexachloroplatinate.

It can also be prepared by treating lanthanum(III) hexafluoroplatinate with ammonium hydroxide:

La_{2}[PtF_{6}]_{3} + 6 NH_{4}OH → 3 (NH_{4})_{2}PtF_{6} + 2 La(OH)_{3}

== Chemical properties ==
Ammonium hexafluoroplatinate hydrolyses, forming the insoluble platinum(IV) hydroxide:

(NH_{4})_{2}PtF_{6} + 4 H_{2}O → Pt(OH)_{4} + 4 HF + 2 NH_{4}F
