= Chloroosmic acid =

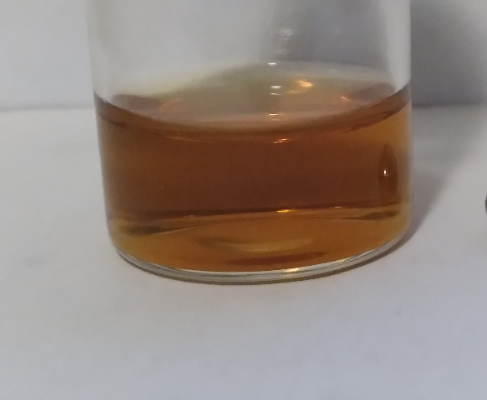
- Solution of chloroosmic acid

Names
- IUPAC name Dihydrogen hexachloroosmate(2-)
- Other names: Hexachloroosmic acid

Identifiers
CAS Number	27057-71-2
3D model (JSmol)	Interactive image
ChemSpider	21241340
ECHA InfoCard	100.043.797
EC Number	248-192-7
PubChem CID	56843362
- InChI: InChI=1S/6ClH.Os/h6*1H;/q;;;;;;+4/p-4 Key: UTIXXJBEMJZGFB-UHFFFAOYSA-J
- SMILES: [H+].[H+].Cl[Os-2](Cl)(Cl)(Cl)(Cl)Cl

Properties
Chemical formula	Cl_{6}H_{2}Os
Molar mass	404.95 g·mol^{−1}
Solubility in water	very soluble

Hazards
- GHS labelling
Pictograms	(GHS05: Corrosive) (GHS06: Toxic)
Signal word	Danger
Hazard statements	H301, H311, H314, H331
Precautionary statements	P260, P262, P264, P264+P265, P270, P271, P280, P301+P316, P301+P330+P331, P302+P352, P302+P361+P354, P304+P340, P305+P354+P338, P316, P317, P321, P330, P361+P364, P363, P403+P233, P405, P501

Related compounds
Other anions	Hexachloroplatinic acid
Other cations	Sodium hexachloroosmate, Potassium hexachloroosmate, Ammonium hexachloroosmate(IV)
- Except where otherwise noted, data are given for materials in their standard state (at 25 °C [77 °F], 100 kPa). Infobox references

Chloroosmic acid (also known as hexachloroosmic acid, and dihydrogen hexachloroosmate) is an inorganic chemical compound with the chemical formula H_{2}OsCl_{6}. It exists as a dark deliquescent solid. It forms a hexahydrate.

== Synthesis ==
Hexachloroosmic acid can be prepared by reducing osmium tetroxide in hydrochloric acid with alcohol and heating. Ferrous chloride is sometimes used in place of alcohol.

OsO_{4} + 4FeCl_{2} + 10HCl → H_{2}OsCl_{6} + 4FeCl_{3} + 4H_{2}O

Another way of preparing it is by dissolving osmium dioxide in hydrochloric acid.

OsO_{2} + 6HCl → H_{2}OsCl_{6} + 2H_{2}O

Solid crystals of the acid can be isolated upon cooling after boiling its solutions down to a syrup.

== Reactions ==
When strong alkali is added to hexachloroosmic acid, it decomposes and precipitates osmium dioxide.

It also reacts with alkali chlorides to yield hexachloroosmate salts, such as ammonium hexachloroosmate(IV).

The coordination complex [H(DMSO)_{2}]_{2}(OsCl_{6}) can be made by reacting chloroosmic acid in ethanol with dimethyl sulfoxide.

== Salts ==
Hexachloroosmates vary in color both in and out of solution depending on the cation. While solutions of the acid possess an amber-orange color, solutions of hexachloroosmate salts are yellow, sodium being the exception which forms deep red solutions. When isolated the sodium, potassium, rubidium, and ammonium salts are all red, while the cesium, silver, and thallium salts are orange, green-brown, and orange-green respectively. It also forms salts with many complex organic cations, yielding yellow, orange, red, and brown crystals.
