= Bis(oxalato)palladate(II) =

Names
- Other names Bis(ethanedioato)palladate(II)

Identifiers
CAS Number	15226-60-5
3D model (JSmol)	Interactive image
- InChI: InChI=1S/2C2H2O4.Pd/c2*3-1(4)2(5)6;/h2*(H,3,4)(H,5,6);/q;;+2/p-4 Key: KDUXSJYRSXMKRO-UHFFFAOYSA-J
- SMILES: [Pd-2]12(OC(=O)C(=O)O1)OC(=O)C(=O)O2

Properties
Chemical formula	[Pd(C_{2}O_{4})_{2}]^{2−}
Molar mass	282.46 g/mol
- Except where otherwise noted, data are given for materials in their standard state (at 25 °C [77 °F], 100 kPa). Infobox references

Bis(oxalato)palladate(II) is an anionic coordination complex of palladium in the +2 oxidation state with two oxalate units as ligands on it. It therefore can be represented by the formula [Pd(C_{2}O_{4})_{2}]^{2−}. Salts containing the ion include potassium bis(oxalato)palladate(II), K_{2}[Pd(C_{2}O_{4})_{2}], and silver bis(oxalato)palladate(II), Ag_{2}[Pd(C_{2}O_{4})_{2}].

== Preparation ==
Bis(oxalato)palladate(II) salts can be prepared by substitution of the chloride ligands in tetrachloropalladate(II) with oxalate. Potassium bis(oxalato)palladate(II) has been prepared from potassium tetrachloropalladate(II) and oxalate in aqueous solution.

[PdCl_{4}]^{2−} + 2 C_{2}O_{4}^{2−} → [Pd(C_{2}O_{4})_{2}]^{2−} + 4 Cl^{−}

Potassium bis(oxalato)palladate has also been prepared from hydrated palladium(II) oxide and oxalic acid.

Other salts can be obtained by metathesis. Silver bis(oxalato)palladate(II), Ag_{2}[Pd(C_{2}O_{4})_{2}], has for example been prepared and used as a precursor to silver–palladium colloids.

== Properties ==
=== Structure ===
Palladium(II) in [Pd(C_{2}O_{4})_{2}]^{2−} has the characteristic square-planar coordination geometry of many d^{8} Pd(II) complexes. Each oxalate ligand acts as a bidentate ligand through two oxygen atoms, producing two five-membered chelate rings.

The structure has been determined in potassium bis(oxalato)palladate(II) tetrahydrate, K_{2}[Pd(C_{2}O_{4})_{2}]·4H_{2}O. The salt crystallizes in the monoclinic space group P2_{1}/n, with lattice parameters a = 11.03 Å, b = 14.86 Å, c = 3.70 Å and β = 93.8°.

The [Pd(C_{2}O_{4})_{2}]^{2−} groups are essentially planar. Oxygen atoms belonging to neighboring complexes lie above and below the palladium coordination plane as the nearest out-of-plane neighbors of Pd.

=== Stability and reactions ===
Potassium bis(oxalato)palladate(II) is commonly isolated as a hydrate. Preparative work describes the material as sufficiently sensitive that it is normally stored in a cool, dark place.

The oxalate ligands can be displaced by other donor ligands. K_{2}[Pd(C_{2}O_{4})_{2}] has therefore been widely used as a starting material for preparing other Pd(II) oxalato complexes.

For example, reaction with substituted adenine ligands gives complexes of the general form [Pd(ox)(L)_{2}]·nH_{2}O, in which one oxalate ligand remains coordinated while the second is replaced by nitrogen donors.

=== Silver salt and photochemical reduction ===
Silver bis(oxalato)palladate(II), Ag_{2}[Pd(C_{2}O_{4})_{2}], can be photochemically reduced in the presence of poly(N-vinylpyrrolidone) to produce bimetallic silver–palladium colloids.

This reaction has been used as a route to Ag–Pd nanoparticles and is one of the better-studied applications of a bis(oxalato)palladate salt.
