= Potassium osmate =

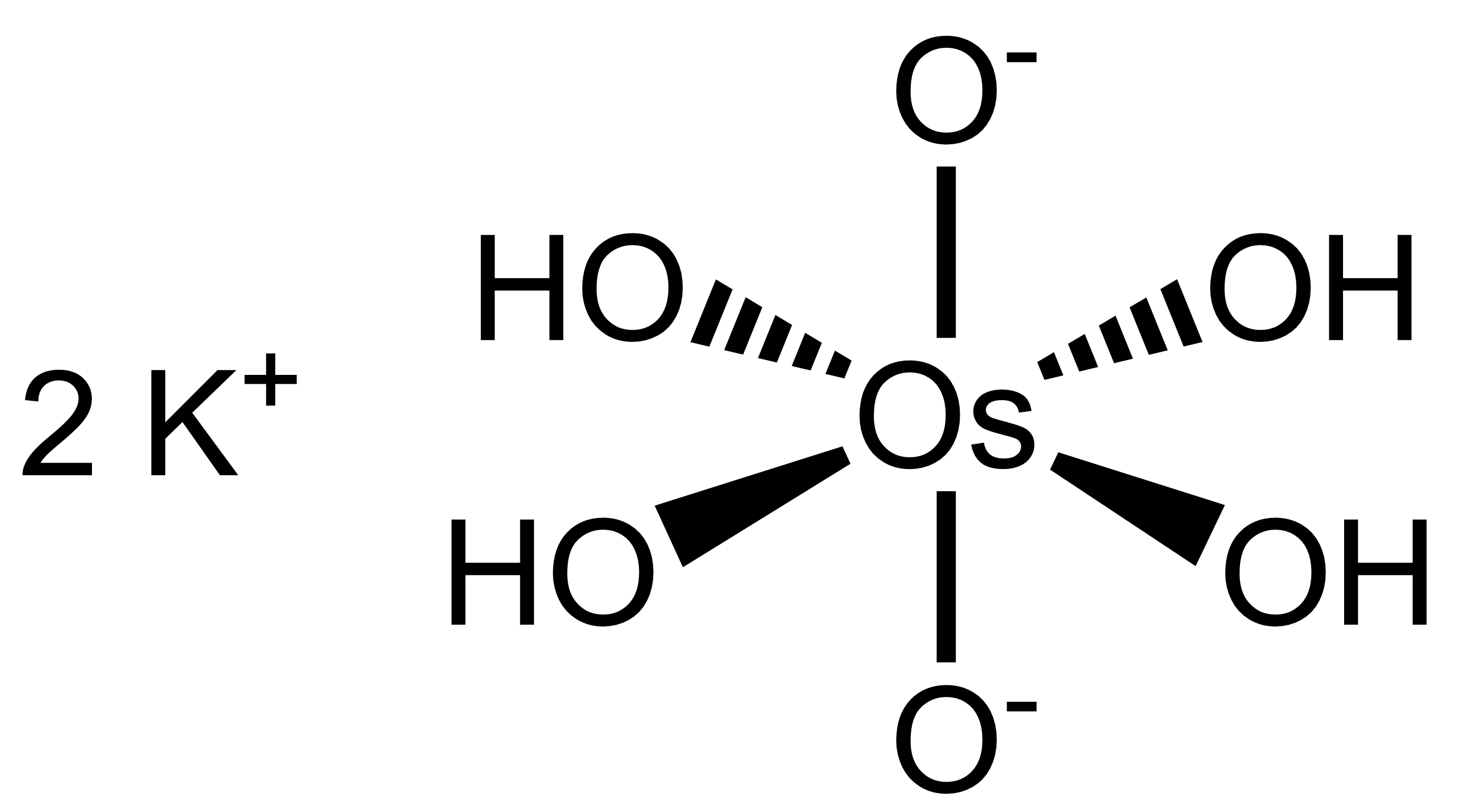

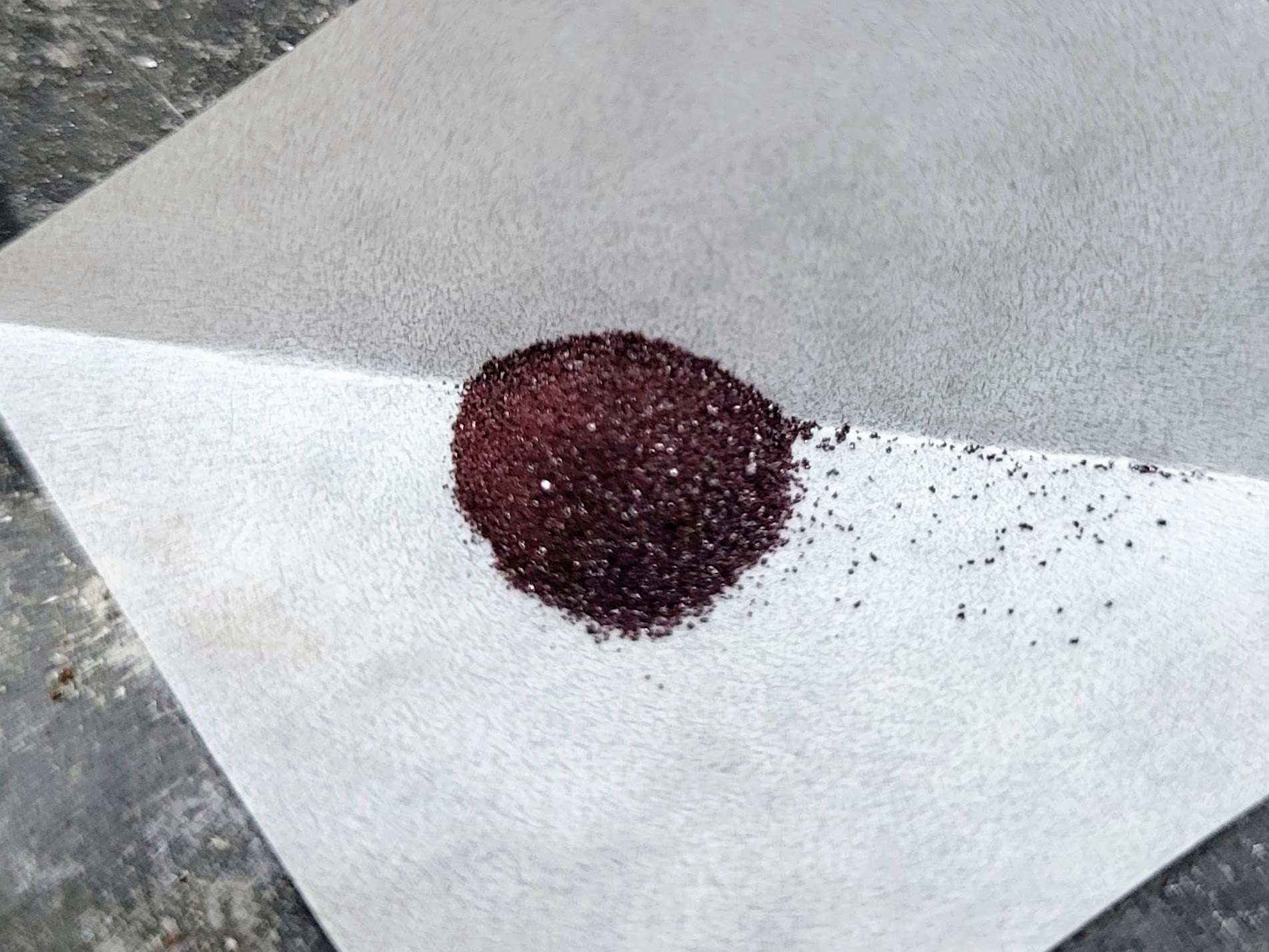

Names
- Other names Potassium osmate(VI) dihydrate

Identifiers
CAS Number	10022-66-9
3D model (JSmol)	Interactive image
ChemSpider	21241360
ECHA InfoCard	100.157.189
EC Number	243-247-1
PubChem CID	53393272
UNII	5M2BWQ2TYJ
CompTox Dashboard (EPA)	DTXSID80693853
- InChI: InChI=1S/2K.4H2O.2O.Os/h;;4*1H2;;;/q2*+1;;;;;2*-1;+4/p-4 Key: DDTIHYGDUUGVNU-UHFFFAOYSA-J
- SMILES: [K+].[K+].[O-][Os](O)(O)(O)(O)[O-]

Properties
Chemical formula	K_{2}[OsO_{2}(OH)_{4}]
Molar mass	368.42 g/mol
Appearance	Purple
Solubility in water	Soluble
Solubility	Insoluble in alcohol or ether

Hazards
- GHS labelling
Pictograms	(GHS06: Toxic)
Signal word	Danger
Hazard statements	H301, H311, H330, H331
Precautionary statements	P260, P264, P270, P271, P280, P284, P301+P310, P302+P352, P304+P340, P310, P311, P312, P320, P321, P330, P361, P363, P403+P233, P405, P501
NFPA 704 (fire diamond)	3 1 1 OX
- Except where otherwise noted, data are given for materials in their standard state (at 25 °C [77 °F], 100 kPa). Infobox references

Potassium osmate is the inorganic compound with the formula K_{2}[OsO_{2}(OH)_{4}]. This diamagnetic purple salt contains osmium in the VI (6+) oxidation state. It gained attention as a catalyst for the asymmetric dihydroxylation of olefins.

== Properties ==
Solid potassium osmate is stable in air. It is more stable in cold water under alkaline conditions, but hot water or acid accelerates decomposition. When exposed to sunlight for prolonged periods of time, it decomposes and produces a sooty powder along with the odor of the tetroxide. It is insoluble in alcohol and ether.

== Structure ==
The complex anion is octahedral. Like related d^{2} dioxo complexes, the oxo ligands are trans. The Os=O and Os-OH distances are 1.75(2) and 1.99(2) Å, respectively. It is a relatively rare example of a metal oxo complex that obeys the 18e rule.

== Preparation ==
The compound was first reported by Edmond Frémy in 1844. Potassium osmate is prepared by reducing osmium tetroxide with ethanol:

2 OsO_{4} + C_{2}H_{5}OH + 5 KOH → CH_{3}CO_{2}K + 2 K_{2}[OsO_{2}(OH)_{4}]

== Reactions ==
Potassium osmate reacts with acids to produce osmyl salts, such as potassium osmyl chloride and the osmyl bromide. It reacts with oxalic acid to produce potassium osmyl oxalate.

K_{2}[OsO_{2}(OH)_{4}] + 4 HCl → K_{2}[OsO_{2}Cl_{4}] + 4 H_{2}O
K_{2}[OsO_{2}(OH)_{4}] + 2 H_{2}C_{2}O_{4} → K_{2}[OsO_{2}(C_{2}O_{4})_{2}] + 4 H_{2}O

Potassium osmate reacts with potassium nitrite to yield potassium osmyl nitrite, and it reacts with ammonium salts to produce osmyl tetra-ammine compounds such as [OsO_{2}(NH_{3})_{4}]SO_{4} and [OsO_{2}(NH_{3})_{4}]Cl_{2}.

Potassium osmate can be reduced to osmium dioxide with alcohol.

K_{2}[OsO_{2}(OH)_{4}] + C_{2}H_{5}OH → OsO_{2}(H_{2}O)_{2} + 2KOH + CH_{3}CHO

It reacts with hydrogen sulfide to produce osmium disulfide, OsS_{2}, and with sulfurous acid to form potassium osmium sulfite.

== Applications ==
Potassium osmate is used as a catalyst for the Sharpless dihydroxylation of olefins. In this application, it shuttles to Os(VIII) derivative, which adds to the olefin. Osmium tetroxide functions equivalently.

== Related compounds ==
Other osmates are known, such as the highly water soluble sodium osmate, and insoluble osmates such as those of barium, strontium, calcium, and lead.

When osmium tetroxide is treated with an alkali hydroxide, or even when potassium osmate is oxidized in alkaline medium, red perosmates are formed, [OsO_{4}(OH)_{2}]^{2-}. When treated with alcohol, perosmates are reduced to osmates, [OsO_{2}(OH)_{4}]^{2-}, yielding purple colored solutions. Perosmate salts share the same valency as osmium tetroxide, as opposed to perruthenates. The perosmates of sodium, potassium, rubidium, cesium, and barium are known.

OsO_{4} + 2KOH → K_{2}[OsO_{4}(OH)_{2}]

When osmium tetroxide is dissolved in anhydrous methanol containing potassium hydroxide, a blue solution of dipotassium tetramethyl osmate (DTMO) is obtained. DTMO was used as a staining agent for electron microscopy.

OsO_{4} + 5CH_{3}OH + 2KOH → K_{2}[OsO_{2}(OCH_{3})_{4}] + H_{2}CO + 4H_{2}O

== See also ==
- Sodium hexachloroosmate
