= Sodium hexachloroosmate =

- Two-dimensional representation of disodium hexachloroosmate salt

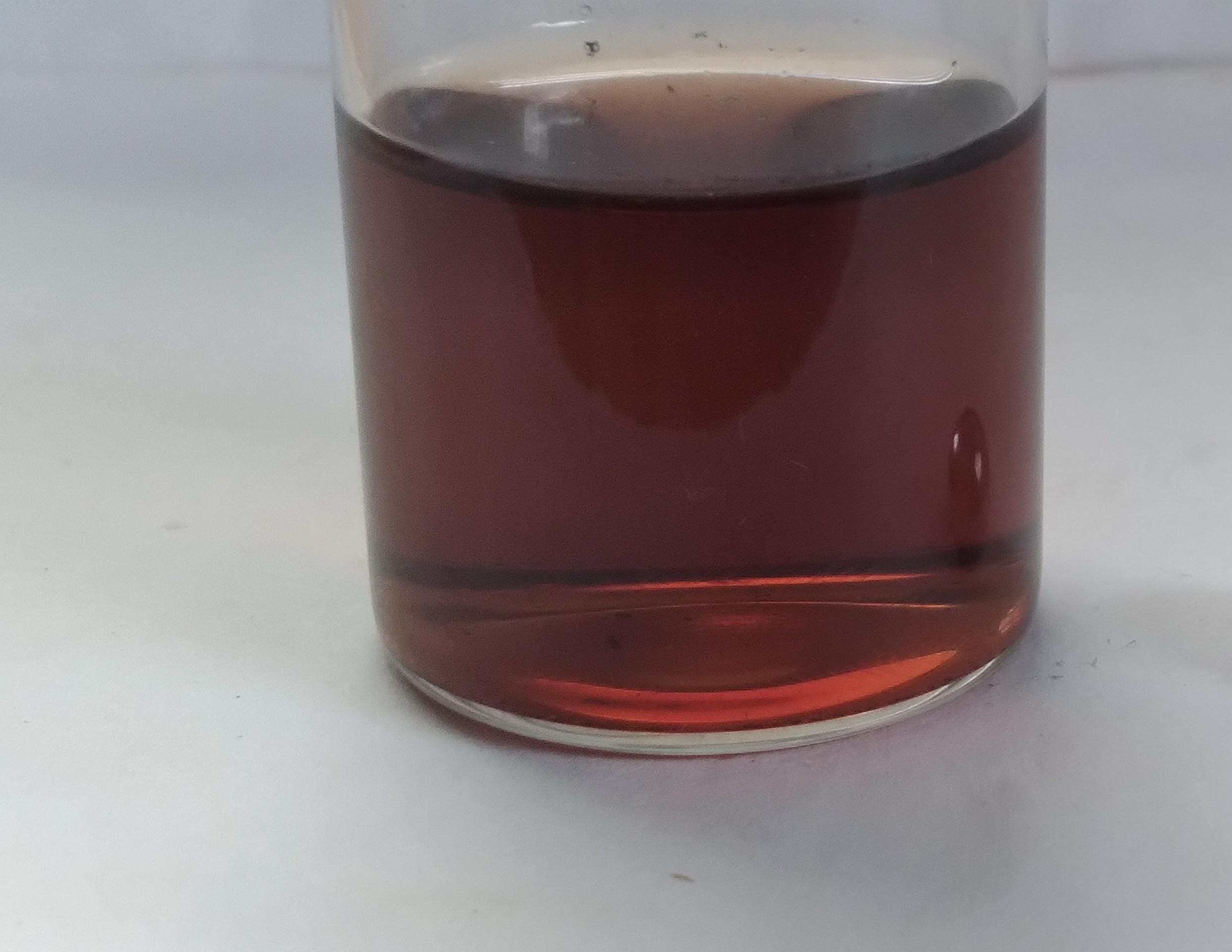
- A solution of sodium hexachloroosmate

Identifiers
CAS Number	207683-17-8 (hydrate); anhydrous: 1307-81-9
3D model (JSmol)	monohydrate: Interactive image; anhydrous: Interactive image
ChemSpider	monohydrate: 32819419; anhydrous: 21171820
ECHA InfoCard	100.013.775
PubChem CID	monohydrate: 71311526; anhydrous: 15762360
CompTox Dashboard (EPA)	DTXSID50156687
- InChI: monohydrate: InChI=1S/6ClH.2Na.H2O.Os/h6*1H;;;1H2;/q;;;;;;2*+1;;+4/p-6 Key: PQSWAUXOSHGRPF-UHFFFAOYSA-H; anhydrous: InChI=1S/6ClH.2Na.Os/h6*1H;;;/q;;;;;;2*+1;+4/p-6 Key: PVTVRPSPEDISMV-UHFFFAOYSA-H
- SMILES: monohydrate: O.[Na+].[Na+].Cl[Os-2](Cl)(Cl)(Cl)(Cl)Cl; anhydrous: [Na+].[Na+].[Cl-].[Cl-].Cl[Os](Cl)(Cl)Cl

Properties
Chemical formula	Cl_{6}Na_{2}Os
Molar mass	448.91 g·mol^{−1}
Appearance	red solid
Density	3.221 g/cm^{3}
- Except where otherwise noted, data are given for materials in their standard state (at 25 °C [77 °F], 100 kPa). Infobox references

Sodium hexachloroosmate is the inorganic compound with the formula Na_{2}OsCl_{6}. A red solid, it is the disodium salt of the osmium(IV) complex [OsCl_{6}]^{2−}. The anion is an octahedral complex with Os-Cl distance of 2.325(3) Å, as established by X-ray crystallography. The compound can be prepared by reaction of a suspension of osmium metal in molten sodium chloride with chlorine:

Os + 2 NaCl + 2 Cl_{2} → Na_{2}OsCl_{6}

Hexachloroosmate is paramagnetic, with a low-spin d^{4} configuration.

== Reactions ==
Sodium hexachloroosmate reacts with a solution of ammonium chloride to produce ammonium hexachloroosmate(IV). Upon exposure to strong alkali, hexachloroosmates will decompose to osmium dioxide. They react with excess ammonia to form so-called osmium diammine hydroxide, OsO(NH_{3})_{2}(OH)_{2}

Sodium hexachloroosmate reacts with triphenylphosphine to form various complexes. When a solution of sodium hexachloroosmate and formalin is added to a boiling solution of triphenylphosphine in 2-methoxyethanol, OsHCl(CO)(PPh_{3})_{3} is formed.

Na_{2}OsCl_{6}•6H_{2}O + 3(C_{6}H_{5})_{3}P ^{formalin}_{———→} OsHCl(CO)[P(C_{6}H_{5})_{3}]_{3}

With an aqueous solution containing potassium hydroxide and formaldehyde they react to produce OsH_{2}(CO)(PPh_{3})_{3}.

Na_{2}OsCl_{6}•6H_{2}O + 3(C_{6}H_{5})_{3}P ^{koh hcho}_{———→} OsH_{2}(CO)[P(C_{6}H_{5})_{3}]_{3}

With ethanol and sodium borohydride they react to produce OsH_{4}[P(C_{6}H_{5})_{3}]_{3}.

Na_{2}OsCl_{6}•6H_{2}O + 3(C_{6}H_{5})_{3}P ^{borohydride}_{————→} OsH_{4}[P(C_{6}H_{5})_{3}]_{3}

With 2-methoxyethanol and n-methyl-n-nitrosotoluene sulfonamide they react to yield OsCl_{3}(NO)[P(C_{6}H_{5})_{3}]_{2}.

Na_{2}OsCl_{6}•6H_{2}O + 2(C_{6}H_{5})_{3}P + p-TolSO_{2}N(NO)(CH_{3}) → OsCl_{3}(NO)[P(C_{6}H_{5})_{3}]_{2}.
