= Osmium dioxide =

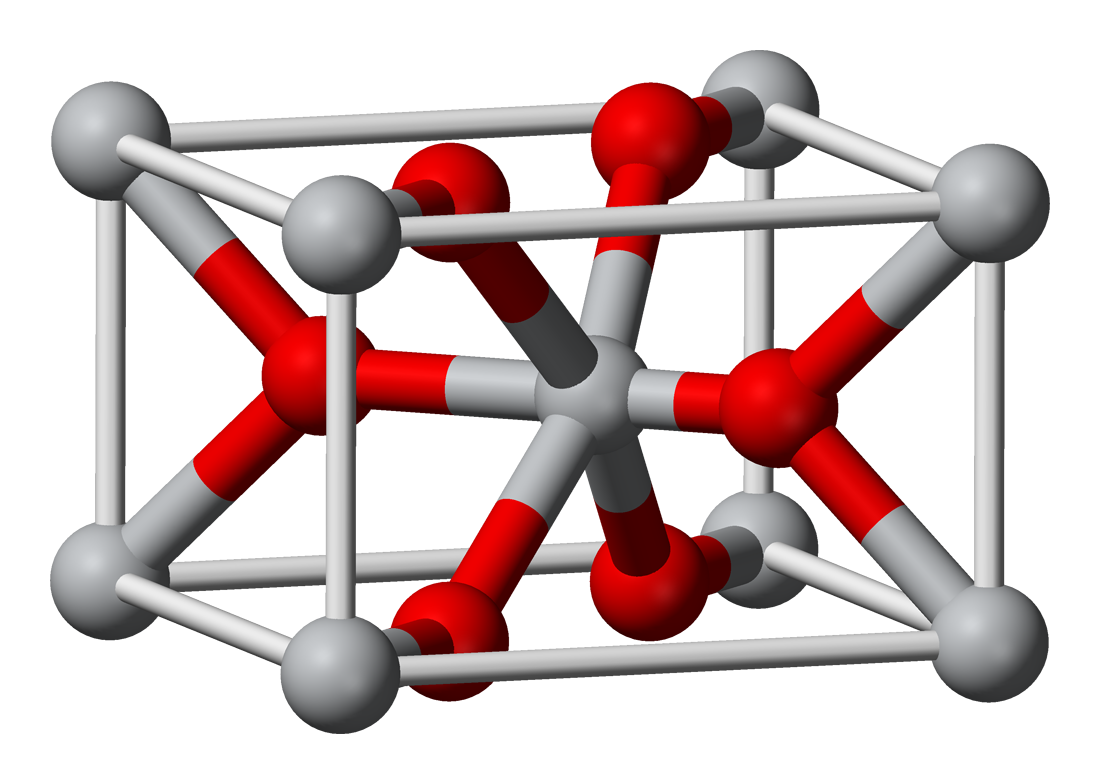
- Osmium(IV) oxide

- Osmium dioxide dihydrate

Names
- IUPAC name Osmium dioxide
- Other names Osmium(IV) oxide

Identifiers
CAS Number	12036-02-1
3D model (JSmol)	Interactive image
ChemSpider	163069
PubChem CID	187574
CompTox Dashboard (EPA)	DTXSID30923354
- InChI: InChI=1S/2O.Os Key: XSXHWVKGUXMUQE-UHFFFAOYSA-N
- SMILES: O=[Os]=O

Properties
Chemical formula	OsO_{2}
Molar mass	222.229 g/mol
Appearance	black or yellow brown
Density	11.4 g/cm^{3}
Melting point	500 °C (932 °F; 773 K) (decomposes)
Solubility in water	insoluble
Solubility	dissolves in HCl

Related compounds
Related osmium oxides	Osmium tetroxide
- Except where otherwise noted, data are given for materials in their standard state (at 25 °C [77 °F], 100 kPa). verify (what is ?) Infobox references

Osmium dioxide is an inorganic compound with the formula OsO_{2}. It exists as brown to black crystalline powder, but single crystals are golden and exhibit metallic conductivity. The compound crystallizes in the rutile structural motif, i.e. the connectivity is very similar to that in the mineral rutile.

== Preparation ==
OsO_{2} can be obtained by the reaction of osmium with a variety of oxidizing agents, including, sodium chlorate, osmium tetroxide, and nitric oxide at about 600 °C. Using chemical transport, one can obtain large crystals of OsO_{2}, sized up to 7x5x3 mm^{3}. Single crystals show metallic resistivity of ~15 μΩ cm. A typical transport agent is O_{2} via the reversible formation of volatile OsO_{4}:

OsO_{2} + O_{2} ⇌ OsO_{4}

It can also be prepared by reducing osmium in higher oxidation states with alcohol, in which it forms a dihydrate. As opposed to the anhydrous dioxide, the dihydrate possesses a bluish black appearance.

K_{2}[OsO_{2}(OH)_{4}] + C_{2}H_{5}OH → OsO_{2}•2H_{2}O + 2KOH + CH_{3}CHO

Adding strong alkali to chloroosmic acid or its salts also yields the dihydrate.

K_{2}OsCl_{6} + 4KOH → 6KCl + OsO_{2}•2H_{2}O

== Properties ==
Osmium dioxide does not dissolve in water, but it can be dissolved by strong acids such as hydrochloric acid. The crystals have rutile structure. Unlike osmium tetroxide, OsO_{2} is not toxic.

== Hexavalent osmium ==
Compounds of osmium in the +6 oxidation state are dominated by the osmyl species, in which OsO_{2} exists as a radical trans-dioxo moiety. These osmyl compounds are all diamagnetic, and stabilized by strong σ-donor and π-donor ligands. Most osmyl compounds are mononuclear and have a linear O=Os=O structure.

Examples of osmyl compounds include K_{2}[OsO_{2}(OH)_{4}], [OsO_{2}(NH_{3})_{4}]Cl_{2}, and K_{2}(OsO_{2})(C_{2}O_{4})_{2}, but many others are known.
