= Ammonium hexachloropalladate =

Names
- IUPAC name diazanium; hexachloropalladium(2-)
- Other names Ammonium hexachloropalladate(IV)

Identifiers
CAS Number	19168-23-1
3D model (JSmol)	Interactive image
ChemSpider	56476
ECHA InfoCard	100.038.943
EC Number	242-854-9
PubChem CID	24859373
CompTox Dashboard (EPA)	DTXSID40893973
- InChI: InChI=1S/6ClH.2H3N.Pd/h6*1H;2*1H3;/q;;;;;;;;+4/p-4 Key: LOLIPEAFAJNGJM-UHFFFAOYSA-J
- SMILES: [NH4+].[NH4+].Cl[Pd-2](Cl)(Cl)(Cl)(Cl)Cl

Properties
Chemical formula	Cl_{6}H_{8}N_{2}Pd
Molar mass	355.20 g·mol^{−1}
Appearance	red-brown crystals
Density	2.148 g/cm^{3}
Solubility in water	slightly soluble

Hazards
- GHS labelling
Pictograms	(GHS07: Exclamation mark)
Signal word	Warning
- Except where otherwise noted, data are given for materials in their standard state (at 25 °C [77 °F], 100 kPa). Infobox references

Ammonium hexachloropalladate is an inorganic chemical compound with the chemical formula (NH_{4})_{2}PdCl_{6}.

== Synthesis ==
Ammonium hexachloropalladate can be made by passing chlorine through a suspension of ammonium tetrachloropalladate(II) in ammonium chloride solution:

(NH_{4})_{2}[PdCl_{4}] + Cl_{2} → (NH_{4})_{2}[PdCl_{6}]

The compound can be precipitated from a solution of hexachloropalladate by adding ammonium chloride:

H_{2}PdCl_{6} + 2NH_{4}Cl → (NH_{4})_{2}[PdCl_{6}] + 2HCl

== Physical properties ==
Ammonium hexachloropalladate forms red-brown crystals of cubic system, space group Fm3m, cell parameters a = 0.983 nm, Z = 4.

It is slightly soluble in water.

== Chemical properties ==
The compound decomposes upon heating to form ammonium tetrachloropalladate(II):

(NH_{4})_{2}[PdCl_{6}] → (NH_{4})_{2}[PdCl_{4}] + Cl_{2}
