= Potassium hexachloroplatinate =

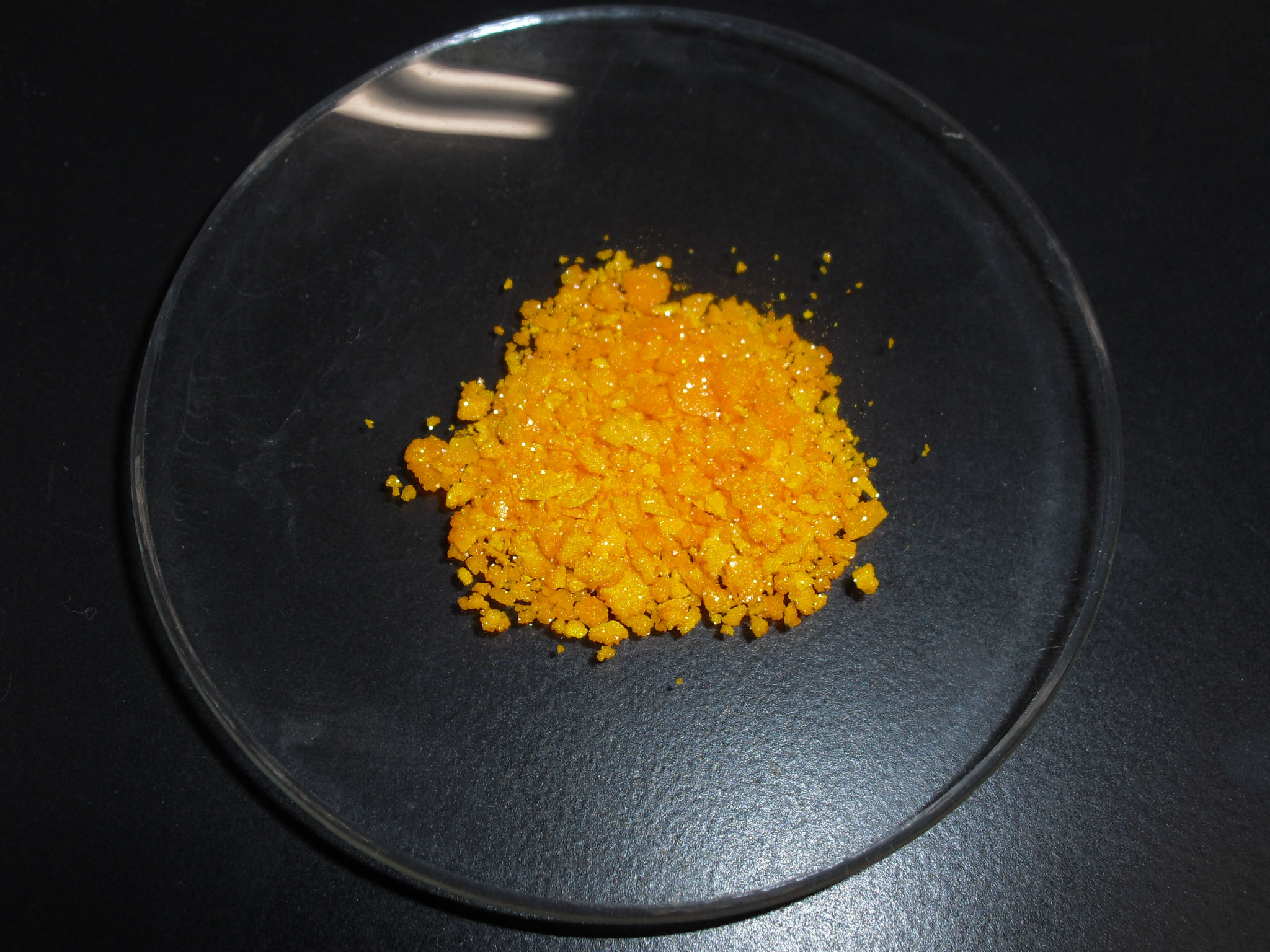

Identifiers
CAS Number	16921-30-5
3D model (JSmol)	Interactive image
ChemSpider	55728
ECHA InfoCard	100.037.239
EC Number	240-979-3
PubChem CID	61856
RTECS number	TP1650000
UNII	99U3Q94QT1
CompTox Dashboard (EPA)	DTXSID90926861
- InChI: InChI=1S/6ClH.2K.Pt/h6*1H;;;/q;;;;;;2*+1;+4/p-6 Key: DPAIVKJGTXERIM-UHFFFAOYSA-H
- SMILES: Cl[Pt-2](Cl)(Cl)(Cl)(Cl)Cl.[K+].[K+]

Properties
Chemical formula	K_{2}PtCl_{6}
Molar mass	485.99 g/mol
Appearance	orange to yellow solid
Density	3.344 g/cm^{3}
Melting point	250 °C (482 °F; 523 K) (decomposes)
Solubility in water	0.89 g/100ml (at 25 °C)
Solubility product (K_{sp})	7.48×10^{−6}

Hazards
- GHS labelling
Pictograms	(GHS05: Corrosive) (GHS06: Toxic) (GHS07: Exclamation mark) (GHS08: Health hazard)
Signal word	Danger
Hazard statements	H301, H317, H318, H334
Precautionary statements	P261, P264, P270, P272, P280, P285, P301+P310, P302+P352, P304+P341, P305+P351+P338, P310, P321, P330, P333+P313, P342+P311, P363, P405, P501
Flash point	250 °C (482 °F; 523 K)
Safety data sheet (SDS)	Oxford MSDS

Related compounds
Other anions	Potassium tetrachloroplatinate; Potassium hexachloropalladate(IV); Potassium hexachloroosmate
Other cations	Hexachloroplatinic acid; Sodium hexachloroplatinate; Ammonium hexachloroplatinate
- Except where otherwise noted, data are given for materials in their standard state (at 25 °C [77 °F], 100 kPa). verify (what is ?) Infobox references

Potassium hexachloroplatinate is the inorganic compound with the formula K_{2}PtCl_{6}. It is a yellow solid that is a poorly soluble in water. The salt features the hexachloroplatinate(IV) dianion, which has octahedral coordination geometry.

The precipitation of this compound from solutions of hexachloroplatinic acid has been used for the determination of potassium by gravimetric analysis. It is an intermediate in the recovery of platinum from wastes.

== Reactions ==
Using salt metathesis reactions, potassium hexachloroplatinate is converted to a variety of quaternary ammonium and related lipophilic salts. These include tetrabutylammonium salt (NBu_{4})_{2}PtCl_{6}, which has been investigated as a catalyst.

Reduction of potassium hexachloroplatinate with hydrazine dihydrochloride gives the corresponding tetrachloroplatinate salt.

Potassium hexachloroplatinate reacts with aqueous ammonia to give chloropentammineplatinum chloride:

K_{2}PtCl_{6} + 5 NH_{3} → [PtCl(NH_{3})_{5}]Cl_{3} + 2 KCl

== Safety ==
Dust containing potassium hexachloroplatinate can be highly allergenic. "Symptoms range from irritation of skin and mucous membranes to life-threatening attacks of asthma."
