= Osmyl tetra-ammine chloride =

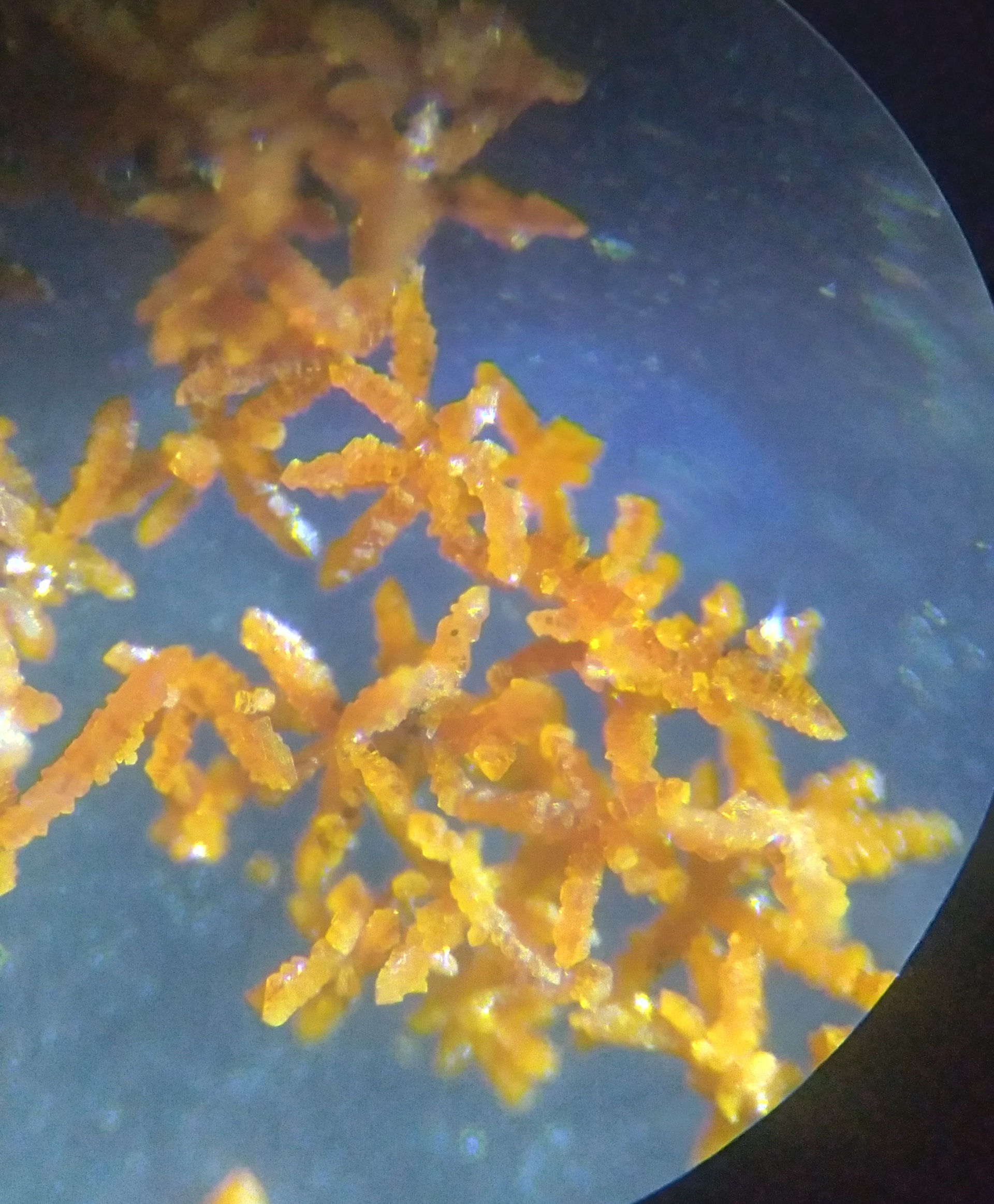

Names
- IUPAC name TetraamminedioxoOsmium(VI)Chloride
- Other names Osmyl tetramminochloride Dioxoosmium(2+) chloride ammoniate (1:2:4)

Identifiers
CAS Number	18496–70–3
3D model (JSmol)	Interactive image
ChemSpider	21241731
ECHA InfoCard	100.206.699
EC Number	681–563–5
PubChem CID	56845690
- InChI: InChI=1S/2ClH.4H3N.2O.Os/h2*1H;4*1H3;;;/q;;;;;;;;+2/p-2 Key: UHBAHWDZFKVBSS-UHFFFAOYSA-L
- SMILES: N.N.N.N.O=[Os+2]=O.[Cl-].[Cl-](Cl)Cl

Properties
Chemical formula	[OsO_{2}(NH_{3})_{4}]Cl_{2}
Molar mass	361.3 g/mol
Appearance	Yellow powder
Solubility in water	slightly soluble
Solubility	Insoluble in alcohol, HCl, and solutions of ammonium salts.

Hazards
- GHS labelling
Pictograms	(GHS07: Exclamation mark)
Signal word	Warning
Hazard statements	H315, H319, H335
Precautionary statements	P261, P264, P264+P265, P271, P280, P302+P352, P304+P340, P305+P351+P338, P319, P321, P332+P317, P337+P317, P362+P364, P403+P233, P405, P501
- Except where otherwise noted, data are given for materials in their standard state (at 25 °C [77 °F], 100 kPa). Infobox references

Osmyl tetra-ammine chloride (also known as osmyl tetramminochloride and tetraamminedioxoosmium (VI) chloride) is an inorganic chemical compound with the formula [OsO_{2}(NH_{3})_{4}]Cl_{2}.

== Synthesis ==
Osmyl tetra-ammine chloride can be prepared by adding ammonium chloride to a solution of potassium osmate.

K_{2}[OsO_{2}(OH)_{4}] + 4NH_{4}Cl → [OsO_{2}(NH_{3})_{4}]Cl_{2} + 2KCl + 4H_{2}O

== Properties ==
Osmyl tetra-ammine chloride is prone to decomposition. In boiling water it disproportionates to osmium tetroxide and osmium oxydiammine chloride. When calcined in hydrogen, it yields osmium metal sponge.

Despite its low solubility in water, solutions of the tetra-ammine chloride react with potassium ferrocyanide to produce a violet color.

== Uses ==
Osmyl tetra-ammine chloride was used to recover metallic osmium. However, this application was abandoned in favor of ammonium hexachloroosmate(IV) due to unsatisfactory yields. Despite this, it is still readily available to purchase from some chemical suppliers.

== Related compounds ==
Other osmyl tetra-ammine salts are known, such as the sulfate, nitrate, and oxalate. Their syntheses and characteristics are similar to those of the chloride.

Their parent base, osmyl tetra-ammine hydroxide, is unstable and known only in solution.
