= Chloropentammineplatinum chloride =

Names
- Other names Pentammineplatinum(IV) chloride, Pentammineplatinum chloride, Chloropentammineplatinum(IV) chloride

Identifiers
| CAS Number | 16893-11-1 |
| 3D model (JSmol) | Interactive image |
| ChemSpider | 141606 |
| PubChem CID | 161201 |
| CompTox Dashboard (EPA) | DTXSID20937566 |
- InChI: InChI=1S/4ClH.5H3N.Pt/h4*1H;5*1H3;/q;;;;;;;;;+4/p-4 Key: XXWVYPODEOCLBT-UHFFFAOYSA-J
- SMILES: N.N.N.N.N.[Cl-].[Cl-].[Cl-].[Cl-].[Pt+4]

Properties
| Chemical formula | Cl_{4}H_{15}N_{5}Pt |
| Molar mass | 422.04 g·mol^{−1} |
| Appearance | white solid |
- Except where otherwise noted, data are given for materials in their standard state (at 25 °C [77 °F], 100 kPa). Infobox references

Chloropentammineplatinum chloride is an inorganic compound with the formula [PtCl(NH_{3})_{5}]Cl_{3}. It is a chloride salt of the coordination complex [PtCl(NH_{3})_{5}]^{+}. It is a white, water soluble solid.

The compound is prepared by treating potassium hexachloroplatinate with aqueous ammonia:

K_{2}PtCl_{6} + 5 NH_{3} → [PtCl(NH_{3})_{5}]Cl_{3} + 2 KCl

== Related platinum(IV) ammines ==
The title complex is one of several platinum ammine complexes.

- Hexaammineplatinum(IV) chloride
- Trichlorotriammineplatinum(IV) chloride
- cis-Tetrachlorodiammineplatinum(IV)
- trans-Tetrachlorodiammineplatinum(IV) (RN 16986-23-5)
