= Potassium osmyl oxalate =

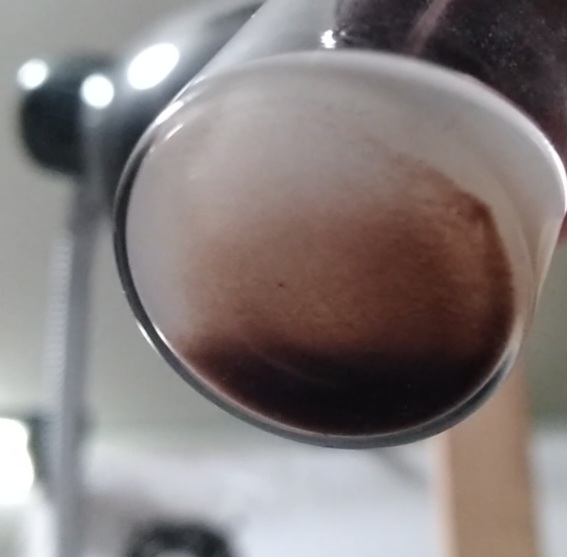

Identifiers
CAS Number	22827-17-4
3D model (JSmol)	Interactive image
ChemSpider	147024
PubChem CID	168069
CompTox Dashboard (EPA)	DTXSID40177381
- InChI: InChI=1S/2C2H2O4.2K.2O.Os/c2*3-1(4)2(5)6;;;;;/h2*(H,3,4)(H,5,6);;;;;/q;;2*+1;;;+2/p-4 Key: QKOSVFDASGVBMI-UHFFFAOYSA-J
- SMILES: C(=O)(C(=O)[O-])[O-].C(=O)(C(=O)[O-])[O-].O=[Os+2]=O.[K+].[K+]

Properties
Chemical formula	K_{2}[OsO_{2}(C_{2}O_{4})_{2}]
Molar mass	276.5 g/mol
Appearance	Brown crystals or powder
Solubility in water	soluble

Structure
Crystal structure	Triclinic, mS20
Space group	P1̅
Lattice constant	a = 6.545 Å, b = 6.835 Å, c = 7.595 Å α = 85.76°, β = 65.33°, γ = 71.14°
Formula units (Z)	1
Coordination geometry	distorted octahedral
- Except where otherwise noted, data are given for materials in their standard state (at 25 °C [77 °F], 100 kPa). Infobox references

Potassium osmyl oxalate (also known as potassium dioxalatodioxoosmate or potassium dioxobisoxalatoosmate), is an organic chemical compound containing osmium in the +6 oxidation state, with the chemical formula K_{2}[OsO_{2}(C_{2}O_{4})_{2}]. It is an example of an osmyl derivative, and it forms a dihydrate.

== Properties ==
As with most osmyl complexes, potassium osmyl oxalate contains a linear O=Os=O unit at its center. The osmyl radical has an absorption band of 868 cm^{−1} in the infrared spectrum, while in the Raman spectrum, this absorption band appears at 910 cm^{−1}.

Potassium osmyl oxalate is stable in dry air at room temperature. While it is soluble in water and acids, it slowly decomposes, by which the osmyl species disproportionates to the dioxide and the tetroxide. In sulfuric acid, this disproportionation happens rapidly. The compound is most stable when dissolved in dimethylformamide and dimethylsulfoxide. It is insoluble in ethanol and acetone.

== Synthesis ==
There are a few different routes to prepare potassium osmyl oxalate. The simplest method involves reacting oxalic acid with potassium osmate.

K_{2}[OsO_{2}(OH)_{4}] + 2H_{2}C_{2}O_{4} → K_{2}(OsO_{2})(C_{2}O_{4})_{2} + 4H_{2}O

It can also be produced by reducing osmium tetroxide in potassium hydroxide with oxalic acid.

OsO_{4} + 2KOH + 3H_{2}C_{2}O_{4} → K_{2}(OsO_{2})(C_{2}O_{4})_{2} + 2CO_{2} + 4H_{2}O

Addition of potassium oxalate to a solution of potassium osmyl chloride will also yield the osmyl oxalate as a precipitate.

K_{2}(OsO_{2})Cl_{4} + 2K_{2}C_{2}O_{4} → K_{2}(OsO_{2})(C_{2}O_{4})_{2} + 4KCl

== Applications ==
Potassium osmyl oxalate containing the synthetic Os-191 radioisotope was used for angiocardiography in children's hospitals.
