= Potassium tetrachloropalladate(II) =

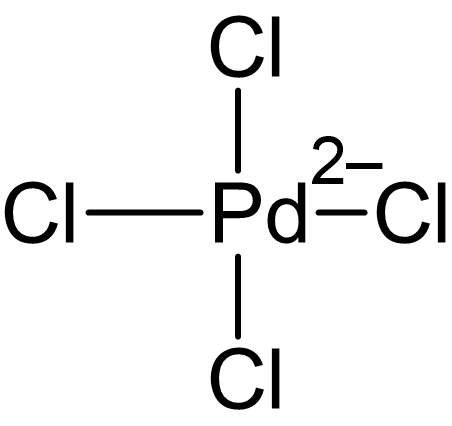

Names
- IUPAC name dipotassium; tetra chloropalladium(2-)

Identifiers
CAS Number	10025-98-6
3D model (JSmol)	Interactive image
ChemSpider	8016031
ECHA InfoCard	100.030.033
EC Number	233-049-3
PubChem CID	61438
CompTox Dashboard (EPA)	DTXSID50905298
- InChI: InChI=1S/4ClH.2K.Pd/h4*1H;;;/q;;;;2*+1;+2/p-4 Key: LGCKLDWLSVFMGL-UHFFFAOYSA-J
- SMILES: [K+].[K+].Cl[Pd--](Cl)(Cl)Cl

Properties
Chemical formula	Cl_{4}K_{2}Pd
Molar mass	326.42 g·mol^{−1}
Appearance	dark brown crystals
Density	2.67 g/cm^{3}
Melting point	525 °C
Solubility in water	soluble
Solubility	poorly soluble in ethanol and acetone

Structure
Crystal structure	tetragonal
Space group	P 4/mmm
Lattice constant	a = 0.706 nm, c = 0.410 nm
Formula units (Z)	1 unit per cell

Hazards
- GHS labelling
Pictograms	(GHS07: Exclamation mark)
Signal word	Warning
Precautionary statements	P261, P305, P338, P351

Related compounds
Other cations	Ammonium tetrachloropalladate(II); Sodium tetrachloropalladate(II)
- Except where otherwise noted, data are given for materials in their standard state (at 25 °C [77 °F], 100 kPa). Infobox references

Potassium tetrachloropalladate(II) is an inorganic compound with the chemical formula K_{2}PdCl_{4}. It is a dark brown solid, forming tetragonal crystals.

== Synthesis ==
Potassium tetrachloropalladate(II) can be prepared by passing chlorine through a palladium black suspension in a concentrated potassium chloride solution:

Pd + Cl_{2} + 2KCl → K_{2}[PdCl_{4}]

It can also be prepared by mixing concentrated solutions of palladium(II) chloride and potassium chloride:

PdCl_{2} + 2KCl → K_{2}[PdCl_{4}]

It forms in the decomposition of potassium hexachloropalladate(IV):

K_{2}[PdCl_{6}] → K_{2}[PdCl_{4}] + Cl_{2}

== Uses ==
The compound is used in the gelation of colloidal semiconductor nanocrystals.

== Reactions ==
The compound reacts with aqua regia forming potassium hexachloropalladate(IV):

3K_{2}[PdCl_{4}] + 6HCl + 2HNO_{3} → 3K_{2}[PdCl_{6}] + 2NO + 4H_{2}O
