= Ammonium tetrachloropalladate(II) =

Names
- IUPAC name diazanium;tetrachloropalladium(2-)
- Other names: Ammonium tetrachloropalladate; Ammonium palladium chloride; Diammonium tetrachloropalladate

Identifiers
CAS Number	13820-40-1
3D model (JSmol)	Interactive image
ChEBI	CHEBI:60149
ChemSpider	55586
ECHA InfoCard	100.034.075
EC Number	237-498-6
Gmelin Reference	45561
PubChem CID	61682
CompTox Dashboard (EPA)	DTXSID301014530
- InChI: InChI=1S/4ClH.2H3N.Pd/h4*1H;2*1H3;/q;;;;;;+2/p-2 Key: IRKVTUVFHGUMMN-UHFFFAOYSA-L
- SMILES: [H][N+]([H])([H])[H].[H][N+]([H])([H])[H].Cl[Pd--](Cl)(Cl)Cl

Properties
Chemical formula	Cl_{4}H_{8}N_{4}Pd
Molar mass	312.31 g·mol^{−1}
Appearance	brown to green crystals
Density	2.17 g/cm^{3}
Melting point	140 °C
Solubility in water	soluble
Solubility	insoluble in ethanol

Hazards
- GHS labelling
Pictograms	(GHS07: Exclamation mark) (GHS05: Corrosive)
Signal word	Warning
Hazard statements	H302, H312, H315, H319, H332, H335

Related compounds
Other cations	Sodium tetrachloropalladate(II); Potassium tetrachloropalladate(II)
- Except where otherwise noted, data are given for materials in their standard state (at 25 °C [77 °F], 100 kPa). Infobox references

Ammonium tetrachloropalladate(II) is a chemical compound with the chemical formula (NH_{4})_{2}PdCl_{4}. It is a reddish brown powder, forming brown to olive green crystals.

== Structure ==
Ammonium tetrachloropalladate(II) forms tetragonal crystals, space group P 4/mmm, cell parameters: a = 0.721 nm, c = 0.426 nm, Z = 1.

== Synthesis ==
Ammonium tetrachloropalladate(II) can be prepared by the slow evaporation of a solution containing tetrachloropalladic acid and ammonium chloride:

H_{2}[PdCl_{4}] + 2NH_{4}Cl → (NH_{4})_{2}[PdCl_{4}] + HCl

Another method involves passing chlorine through a palladium black suspension in a concentrated ammonium chloride solution:

Pd + Cl_{2} + 2NH_{4}Cl → (NH_{4})_{2}[PdCl_{4}]

== Uses ==
The compound is used for the preparation of palladium metallic particles. In addition, it forms Pd-creatinine complexes, which is used in the field of catalysis and semiconductors.

== Reactions ==
With the gradual addition of ammonia, an insoluble compound referred to as "Vauquelin's salt" is formed. It is the palladium analogue to Magnus's green salt.

2(NH_{4})_{2}[PdCl_{4}] + 4NH_{3} → [Pd(NH_{3})_{4}][PdCl_{4}] + 4NH_{4}Cl
