= Ammonium hexachlororhodate(III) =

Names
- IUPAC name Ammonium hexachlororhodate(III)
- Other names: Ammonium chlororhodate(III); Triammonium hexachlororhodate

Identifiers
CAS Number	15336-18-2
3D model (JSmol)	Interactive image
ChemSpider	17339499
ECHA InfoCard	100.035.770
EC Number	239-364-2
PubChem CID	16211509
CompTox Dashboard (EPA)	DTXSID80934738
- InChI: InChI=1S/6ClH.3H3N.Rh/h6*1H;3*1H3;/q;;;;;;;;;+3/p-3 Key: OJNYBYILSUWBHM-UHFFFAOYSA-K
- SMILES: [Rh+3]([Cl-])([Cl-])([Cl-])([Cl-])([Cl-])[Cl-].[NH4+]

Properties
Chemical formula	Cl_{6}H_{12}N_{3}Rh
Molar mass	369.72 g·mol^{−1}
Appearance	red crystals
Density	2.2 g/cm^{3}
Solubility in water	slightly soluble

Hazards
- GHS labelling
Pictograms	(GHS05: Corrosive) (GHS07: Exclamation mark)
Signal word	Danger
Hazard statements	H315, H318, H319
Precautionary statements	P264, P264+P265, P280, P302+P352, P305+P351+P338, P305+P354+P338, P317, P321, P332+P317, P337+P317, P362+P364
- Except where otherwise noted, data are given for materials in their standard state (at 25 °C [77 °F], 100 kPa). Infobox references

Ammonium hexachlororhodate(III) is an inorganic compound with the chemical formula (NH_{4})_{3}RhCl_{6}(H_{2}O). It is a red, diamagnetic solid that is slightly soluble in water. It is one of several salts of hexachlororhodate.

== Structure ==
A monohydrate has been characterized by X-ray crystallography. It forms orthorhombic crystals (space group: Pnma, a = 1.2213, b = 0.7012, c = 1.4151 nm, α = β = γ = 90°).

== Preparation and reactions ==
Ammonium hexachlororhodate(III) can be prepared by treating rhodium trichloride with excess ammonium chloride solution:

RhCl_{3} + 3NH_{4}Cl → (NH_{4})_{3}RhCl_{6}

The compound undergoes partial hydrolysis in dilute aqueous solutions:

(NH_{4})_{3}[RhCl_{6}] + H_{2}O → (NH_{4})_{2}[RhCl_{5}(H_{2}O)] + NH_{4}Cl

== Related compounds ==
- Ammonium hexachloroiridate(IV)
- Ammonium hexachloroplatinate(IV)
