= Carbonylchlorohydrotris(triphenylphosphine)osmium =

Carbonylchlorohydrotris (triphenylphosphine) osmium (II)

Identifiers
CAS Number	16971-31-6
3D model (JSmol)	Interactive image
ChemSpider	78388
EC Number	241-050-5
PubChem CID	86891
- InChI: InChI=1S/3C18H15P.CO.ClH.Os.H/c3*1-4-10-16(11-5-1)19(17-12-6-2-7-13-17)18-14-8-3-9-15-18;1-2;;;/h3*1-15H;;1H;;/q;;;;;+2;-1/p-1 Key: XUWSMTCLGDHTRB-UHFFFAOYSA-M
- SMILES: [H-].[C-]#[O+].C1=CC=C(C=C1)P(C2=CC=CC=C2)C3=CC=CC=C3.C1=CC=C(C=C1)P(C2=CC=CC=C2)C3=CC=CC=C3.C1=CC=C(C=C1)P(C2=CC=CC=C2)C3=CC=CC=C3.[Cl-].[Os+2]

Properties
Chemical formula	OsHCl(CO)(PPh_{3})_{3}
Molar mass	1041.6 g/mol
Appearance	White solid.
Melting point	179-183°C
Solubility in water	insoluble
- Except where otherwise noted, data are given for materials in their standard state (at 25 °C [77 °F], 100 kPa). Infobox references

Carbonylchlorohydrotris(triphenylphosphine)osmium is a coordination complex with the formula OsHCl(CO)[P(C_{6}H_{5})_{3}]_{3}. It contains four different ligands: hydride, carbon monoxide, chloride, and triphenylphosphine. As confirmed by X-ray crystallography, the complex has with meridional geometry (three phosphine ligands are coplanar) and the CO and Cl are mutually trans.

== Properties ==
It forms white crystalline prisms. It is insoluble in water, alcohols, and non-aromatic hydrocarbons, but moderately soluble in benzene, chloroform, dichloromethane, and acetone. When heated to its melting point in air, it reacts with oxygen and decomposes. In a sealed container of nitrogen it melts at 290°C with decomposition. The infrared spectrum shows a strong band at 2099 cm^{−1}.

== Synthesis ==
It is prepared by heating ammonium hexachloroosmate(IV) with triphenylphosphine in boiling 2-(2-methoxyethoxy)ethanol. As described by the following equation, the high boiling alcohol serves as a source of CO:

(NH_{4})_{2}OsCl_{6} + 4 P(C_{6}H_{5})_{3} + 3 C_{5}H_{12}O_{3} → OsHCl(CO)[P(C_{6}H_{5})_{3}]_{3} + 2 NH_{4}Cl + [CH_{3}(OCH_{2}CH_{2})_{2}O]_{2}P(C_{6}H_{5})_{3} + 3 HCl + CH_{3}OCH_{2}CH_{2}OCH_{3}

A similar but milder method (refluxing 2-methoxyethanol) employs formalin as a source of carbon monoxide. Again this complicated reaction is described by an idealized equation:

Na_{2}OsCl_{6} + H_{2}O + CH_{2}O + 4 (C_{6}H_{5})_{3}P → OsHCl(CO)[P(C_{6}H_{5})_{3}]_{3} + 2 HCl + OP(C_{6}H_{5})_{3}

It can also be prepared by reducing OsCl_{3}(PPh_{3})_{3} with formaldehyde.

== Reactions ==
It reacts with N-methyl-N-nitrosotoluene sulfonamide to yield the nitrosyl complex Os(NO)(CO)Cl(PPh_{3})_{2}, which in turn can react with oxygen and triphenylphosphine to produce OsCl(NO)(PPh_{3})_{3}.

When treated with sodium hydroxide in a boiling solution of 2-methoxyethanol, it converts to the dihydride OsH_{2}(CO)[P(C_{6}H_{5})_{3}]_{3}:

OsHCl(CO)[P(C_{6}H_{5})_{3}]_{3} + NaOH + CH_{3}OCH_{2}CH_{2}OH → OsH_{2}(CO)[P(C_{6}H_{5})_{3}]_{3} + CH_{3}OCH_{2}CHO + NaCl + H_{2}O
