= Osmium oxydiammine dihydroxide =

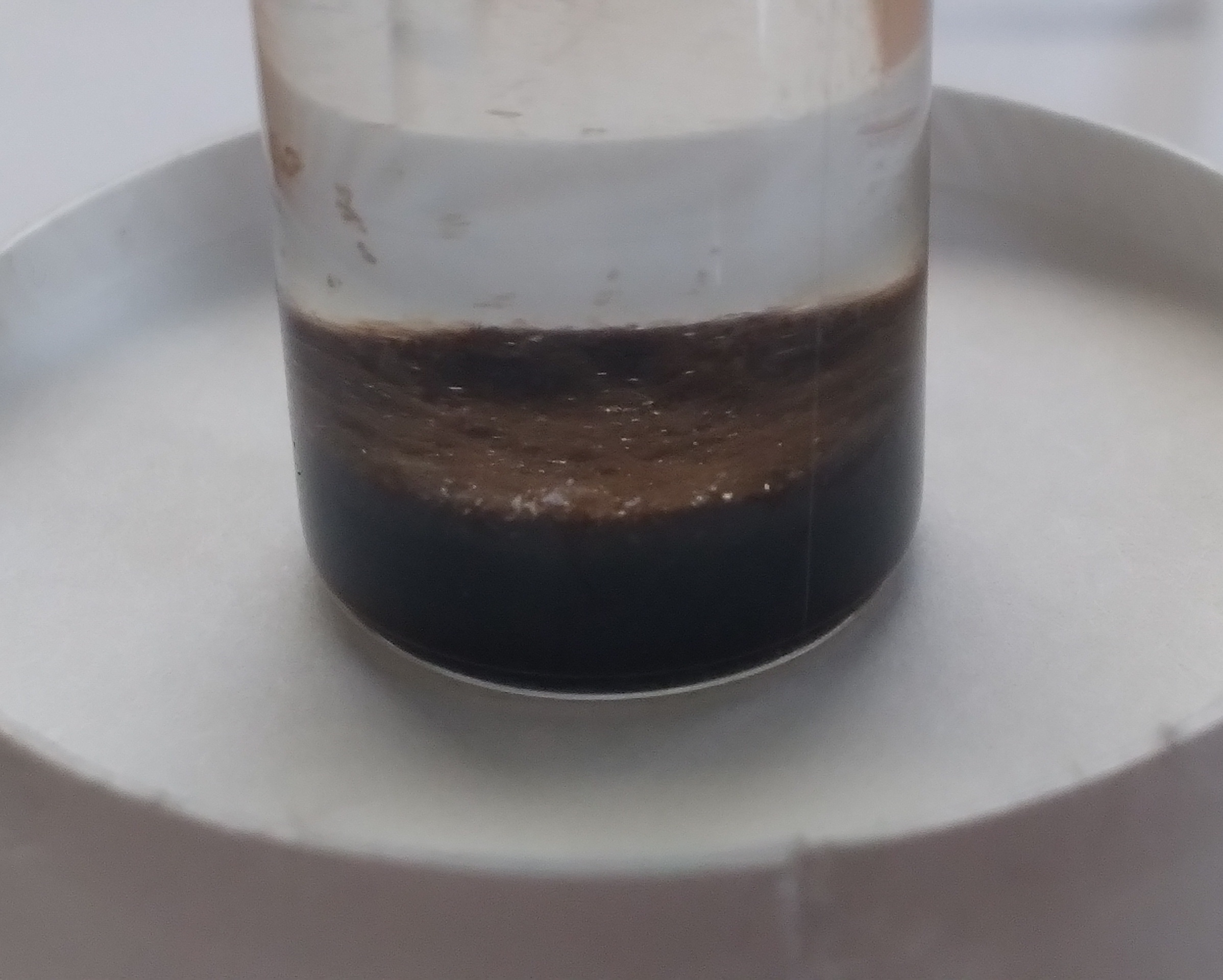
- Osmium oxydiammine dihydroxide stored in water.

Names
- Other names: Osmium oxydiammine-dihydroxide; Oxyosmiumamine hydroxide; Osmosyldiammine hydroxide; Ammonio-sesquioxide of osmium

Identifiers
3D model (JSmol)	Interactive image
- InChI: InChI=1S/2H3N.2H2O.O.Os/h2*1H3;2*1H2;;/q;;;;;+2/p-2; Key: XLQFMNGSMNDSFO-UHFFFAOYSA-L
- SMILES: N.N.O=[Os](O)O

Properties
Chemical formula	[OsO(NH_{3})_{2}](OH)_{2}
Molar mass	274.31 g/mol
Appearance	brown powder
Melting point	(decomposes)
Solubility in water	insoluble
Solubility	dissolves in acids
- Except where otherwise noted, data are given for materials in their standard state (at 25 °C [77 °F], 100 kPa). Infobox references

Osmium oxydiammine dihydroxide is an inorganic chemical compound with the formula [OsO(NH_{3})_{2}](OH)_{2}. It exists as a brown powder that is insoluble in water.

== Synthesis ==
The compound was first produced by Berzelius by reducing osmium tetroxide with an excess of ammonia at 50°C.

3OsO_{4} + 10NH_{3} → 3OsO(NH_{3})_{2}(OH)_{2} + 2N_{2} + 3H_{2}O

It can also be produced by treating hexachloroosmates with ammonia.

== Properties ==
Osmium oxydiammine dihydroxide decomposes explosively when heated in air, releasing nitrogen gas.

When heated to boiling in concentrated alkali hydroxide solutions, osmium oxydiammine dihydroxide releases ammonia and decomposes to osmium dioxide. It dissolves in acids.
