= Potassium hexachloropalladate(IV) =

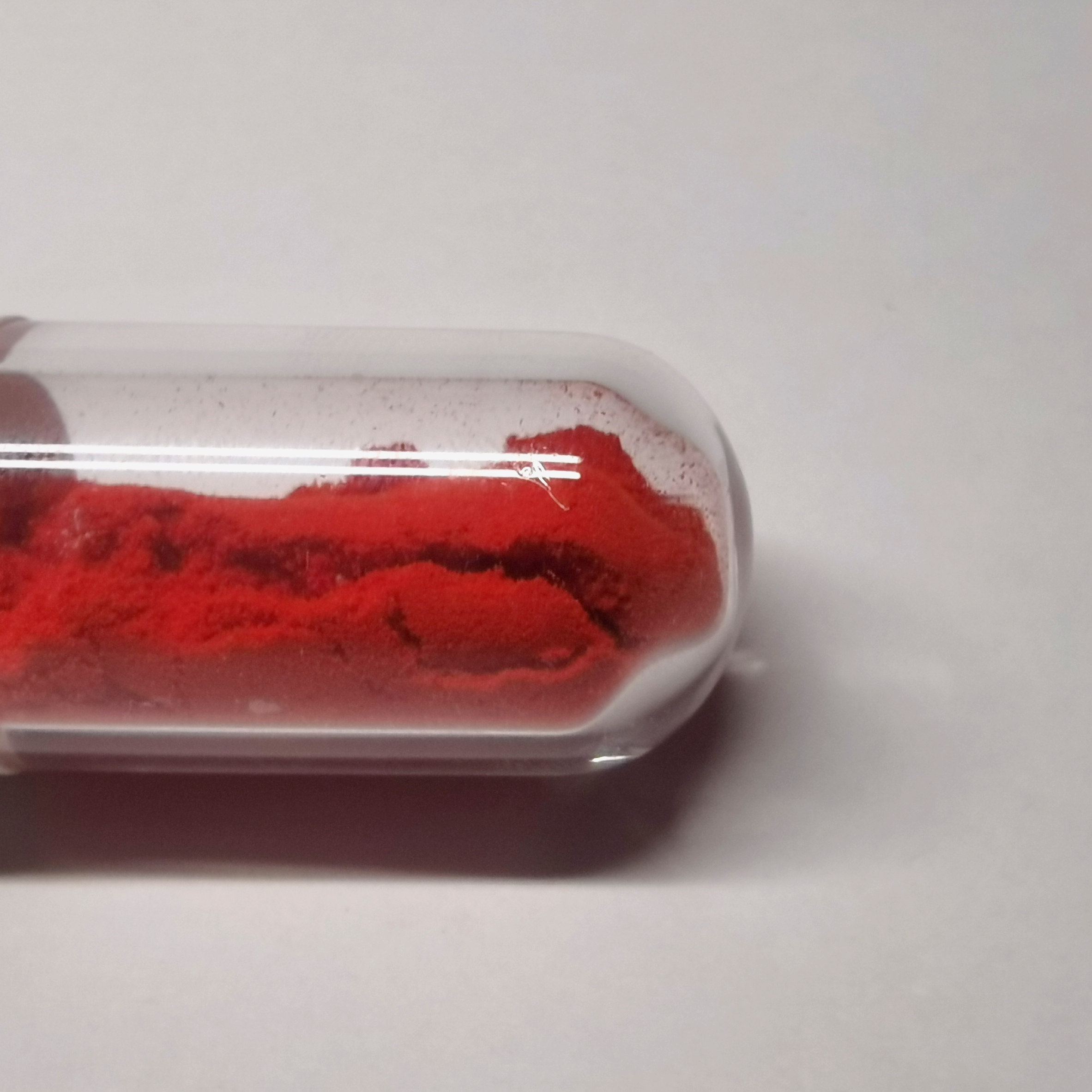

Names
- IUPAC name dipotassium;hexachloropalladium(2-)
- Other names Dipotassium Hexachloropalladate(2-)

Identifiers
CAS Number	16919-73-6
ChEBI	CHEBI:231511
ChemSpider	55724
ECHA InfoCard	100.037.234
EC Number	240-974-6
PubChem CID	61852
CompTox Dashboard (EPA)	DTXSID30926860
- InChI: InChI=1S/6ClH.2K.Pd/h6*1H;;;/q;;;;;;2*+1;+4/p-6 Key: OEDRXJBJMMJUSV-UHFFFAOYSA-H

Properties
Chemical formula	Cl_{6}K_{2}Pd
Molar mass	397.32 g·mol^{−1}
Appearance	red-brown crystals
Density	2.74 g/cm^{3}
Melting point	525 °C
Solubility in water	Poorly soluble

Hazards
- GHS labelling
Pictograms	(GHS07: Exclamation mark)
Signal word	Warning
Hazard statements	H319
Precautionary statements	P305, P338, P351
- Except where otherwise noted, data are given for materials in their standard state (at 25 °C [77 °F], 100 kPa). Infobox references

Potassium hexachloropalladate(IV) is an inorganic chemical compound with the chemical formula K_{2}[PdCl_{6}]. It forms cubic red-brown crystals.

== Properties ==
The compound decomposes when heated or in a hot concentrated hydrochloric acid solution:

K_{2}[PdCl_{6}] → K_{2}[PdCl_{4}] + Cl_{2}

== Synthesis ==
Potassium hexachloropalladate(IV) can be prepared by the dissolution of potassium tetrachloropalladate(II) in aqua regia:

3K_{2}[PdCl_{4}] + 6HCl + 2HNO_{3} → 3K_{2}[PdCl_{6}] + 2NO + 4H_{2}O

It can also be prepared by passing chlorine through a suspension of potassium tetrachloropalladate(II) in a solution of potassium chloride:

K_{2}[PdCl_{4}] + Cl_{2} → K_{2}[PdCl_{6}]

== Uses ==
The compound is used in photography.

It is also used as an organic reagent and pharmaceutical intermediate.
