= Platinum bromide =

Platinum bromide can refer to:

- Platinum(II) bromide, PtBr_{2}
- Platinum(II,IV) bromide , PtBr_{3}
- Platinum(IV) bromide, PtBr_{4}
