= Benzonitrile =

Skeletal formula
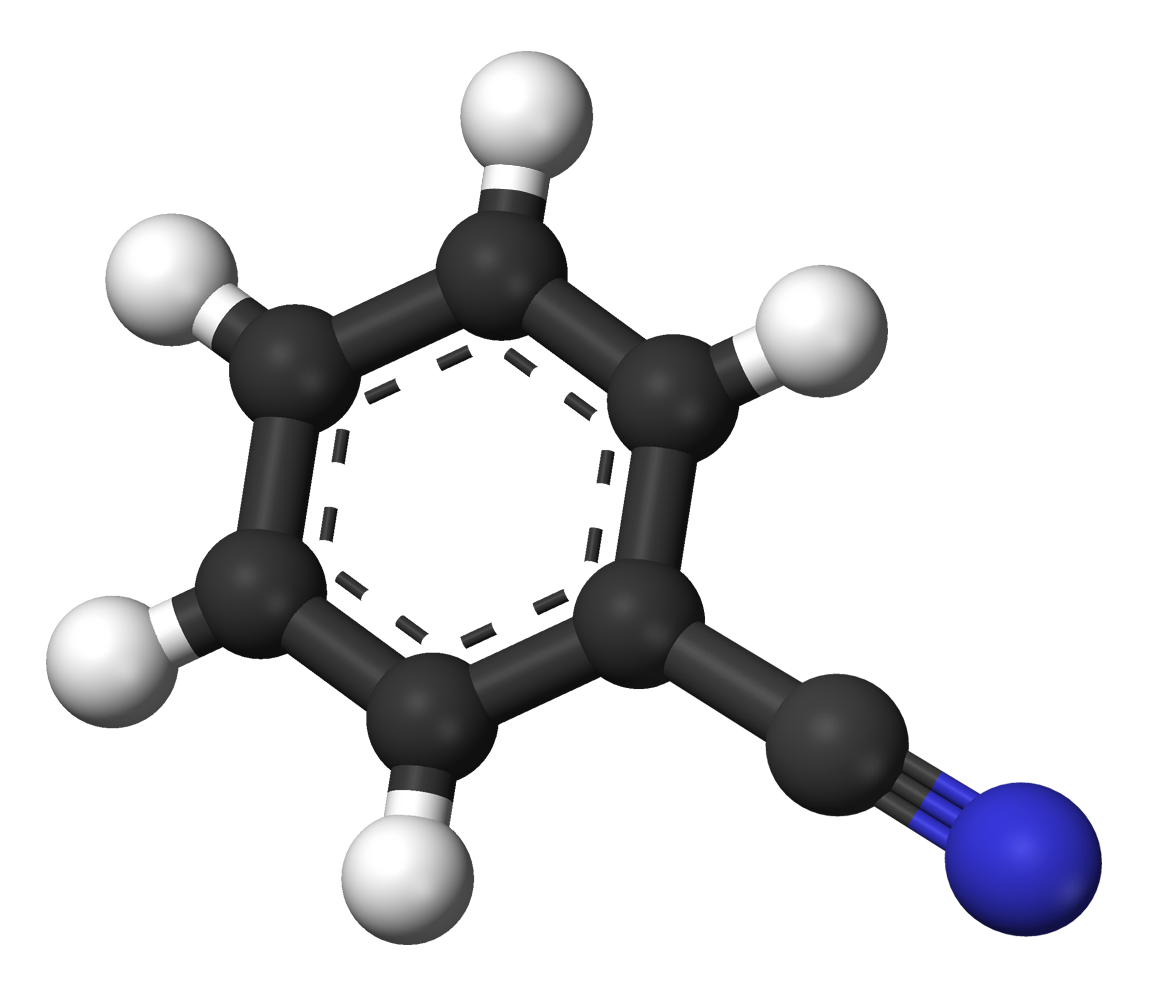
Ball-and-stick model

Names
- Preferred IUPAC name Benzonitrile
- Systematic IUPAC name Benzenecarbonitrile
- Other names cyanobenzene phenyl cyanide

Identifiers
CAS Number	100-47-0
3D model (JSmol)	Interactive image
Abbreviations	PhCN; CNPh
Beilstein Reference	506893
ChEBI	CHEBI:27991
ChEMBL	ChEMBL15819
ChemSpider	7224
ECHA InfoCard	100.002.596
EC Number	202-855-7
Gmelin Reference	2653
KEGG	C09814
PubChem CID	7505
RTECS number	DI2450000
UNII	9V9APP5H5S
UN number	2224
CompTox Dashboard (EPA)	DTXSID7021491
- InChI: InChI=1S/C7H5N/c8-6-7-4-2-1-3-5-7/h1-5H Key: JFDZBHWFFUWGJE-UHFFFAOYSA-N; InChI=1/C7H5N/c8-6-7-4-2-1-3-5-7/h1-5H Key: JFDZBHWFFUWGJE-UHFFFAOYAY
- SMILES: N#Cc1ccccc1

Properties
Chemical formula	C_{7}H_{5}N
Molar mass	103.124 g·mol^{−1}
Density	1.0 g/ml
Melting point	−13 °C (9 °F; 260 K)
Boiling point	188 to 191 °C (370 to 376 °F; 461 to 464 K)
Solubility in water	<0.5 g/100 ml (22 °C)
Magnetic susceptibility (χ)	−65.19·10^{−6} cm^{3}/mol
Refractive index (n_{D})	1.5280

Hazards
- GHS labelling
Pictograms	(GHS07: Exclamation mark)
Signal word	Warning
Hazard statements	H302, H312
Precautionary statements	P264, P270, P280, P301+P312, P302+P352, P312, P322, P330, P363, P501
NFPA 704 (fire diamond)	3 2 0
Flash point	75 °C (167 °F; 348 K)
Autoignition temperature	550 °C (1,022 °F; 823 K)
Explosive limits	1.4–7.2%
- Except where otherwise noted, data are given for materials in their standard state (at 25 °C [77 °F], 100 kPa). verify (what is ?) Infobox references

Benzonitrile is the chemical compound with the formula C_{6}H_{5}(CN), abbreviated PhCN. This aromatic organic compound is a colorless liquid with a cherry or almond like odour. It is mainly used industrially to synthesize the melamine resin precursor benzoguanamine.

== Production and reactions ==
It is prepared by ammoxidation of toluene, that is its reaction with ammonia and oxygen (or air) at 400 to 450 °C (752 to 842 °F).

C_{6}H_{5}CH_{3} + 3/2 O_{2} + NH_{3} → C_{6}H_{5}(CN) + 3 H_{2}O

In the laboratory it can be prepared by the dehydration of benzamide or benzaldehyde oxime or by the Rosenmund–von Braun reaction using cuprous cyanide or NaCN/DMSO and bromobenzene.

Hydrogenation of benzonitrile in principle gives benzylamine, but owing to transamination, dibenzylamine and tribenzylamine are also produced.

== Applications ==
Benzonitrile is a useful solvent and a versatile precursor to many derivatives. It reacts with amines to afford N-substituted benzamides after hydrolysis. It is a precursor to diphenylmethanimine via reaction with phenylmagnesium bromide followed by methanolysis.

Benzonitrile forms coordination complexes with transition metals that are both soluble in organic solvents and conveniently labile. One example is PdCl_{2}(PhCN)_{2}. The benzonitrile ligands are readily displaced by stronger ligands, making benzonitrile complexes useful synthetic intermediates.

== History ==
Benzonitrile was reported by Hermann Fehling in 1844. He found the compound as a product from the thermal dehydration of ammonium benzoate. He deduced its structure from the already known analogue reaction of ammonium formate yielding hydrogen cyanide (formonitrile). He also coined the name benzonitrile which gave the name to all the group of nitriles.

In 2018, benzonitrile was reported to be detected in the interstellar medium.
