= Platinum(II) bromide =

Names
- IUPAC name Platinum(II) bromide
- Other names Platinous bromide Platinum dibromide

Identifiers
| CAS Number | 13455-12-4 |
| 3D model (JSmol) | Interactive image |
| ChemSpider | 75324 |
| ECHA InfoCard | 100.033.303 |
| EC Number | 236-64-8 |
| PubChem CID | 83486 |
| UNII | 89VK2P9DEN |
| CompTox Dashboard (EPA) | DTXSID6065476 |
- InChI: InChI=1S/2BrH.Pt/h2*1H;/q;;+2/p-2 Key: KGRJUMGAEQQVFK-UHFFFAOYSA-L
- SMILES: Br[Pt]Br

Properties
| Chemical formula | Br_{2}Pt |
| Molar mass | 354.886 g/mol |
| Appearance | Dark green powder |
| Density | 6.65 g/cm^{3}, solid |
| Melting point | 250 °C (482 °F; 523 K) (decomposes) |
| Solubility in water | insol. |

Structure
| Coordination geometry | square planar |
| Dipole moment | 0 D |

Hazards
- Occupational safety and health (OHS/OSH)
| Main hazards | skin irritant |
- GHS labelling
| Pictograms | (GHS07: Exclamation mark) |
| Signal word | Warning |
| Hazard statements | H315, H319, H335 |
| Precautionary statements | P261, P264, P271, P280, P302+P352, P304+P340, P305+P351+P338, P312, P321, P332+P313, P337+P313, P362, P403+P233, P405, P501 |

Related compounds
| Other anions | Platinum(II) chloride |
| Related compounds | Platinum(IV) bromide |
- Except where otherwise noted, data are given for materials in their standard state (at 25 °C [77 °F], 100 kPa). verify (what is ?) Infobox references

Platinum bromide is the chemical compound with the formula PtBr_{2}. This dark green powder is a common precursor to other platinum-bromide compounds. Like palladium chloride and palladium(II) bromide, it is a compound that dissolves only in coordinating solvents or in the presence of donor ligands.

== Illustrative use ==
Transition metal carbene complexes of platinum can be prepared by heating platinum bromide with the imidazolium salt NHC precursors and sodium acetate in dimethyl sulfoxide.
