= C7H9NO2 =

The molecular formula C_{7}H_{9}NO_{2} (molar mass: 139.15 g/mol, exact mass: 139.0633 u) may refer to:

- Ammonium benzoate
- Deferiprone (Ferriprox)
- Gabaculine
