= Platinum fluoride =

Platinum fluoride may refer to:

- Platinum(II) fluoride (Platinum difluoride), PtF_{2}
- Platinum(IV) fluoride (Platinum tetrafluoride), PtF_{4}
- Platinum(V) fluoride (Platinum pentafluoride), PtF_{5}
- Platinum(VI) fluoride (Platinum hexafluoride), PtF_{6}
