= Dibenzylamine =

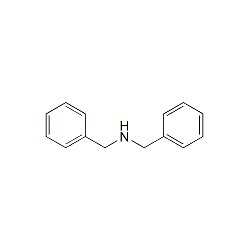

Identifiers
CAS Number	103-49-1; hydrochloride: 20455-68-9
3D model (JSmol)	Interactive image; hydrochloride: Interactive image
Abbreviations	Bn_{2}NH
ChEBI	CHEBI:189125
ChEMBL	ChEMBL3182419
ChemSpider	7373
ECHA InfoCard	100.002.834
EC Number	203-117-7; hydrochloride: 243-834-2
PubChem CID	7656; hydrochloride: 13000629
UNII	3G0YFX01C6; hydrochloride: 668U27NZZ8
CompTox Dashboard (EPA)	DTXSID6044355; hydrochloride: DTXSID10942629
- InChI: InChI=1S/C14H15N/c1-3-7-13(8-4-1)11-15-12-14-9-5-2-6-10-14/h1-10,15H,11-12H2 Key: BWLUMTFWVZZZND-UHFFFAOYSA-N; hydrochloride: InChI=1S/C14H15N.ClH/c1-3-7-13(8-4-1)11-15-12-14-9-5-2-6-10-14;/h1-10,15H,11-12H2;1H Key: QEUMNQFVAMSSNS-UHFFFAOYSA-N
- SMILES: C1=CC=C(C=C1)CNCC2=CC=CC=C2; hydrochloride: C1=CC=C(C=C1)CNCC2=CC=CC=C2.Cl

Properties
Chemical formula	C_{14}H_{15}N
Molar mass	197.281 g·mol^{−1}
Appearance	colorless oil
Density	1.026 g/cm^{3}
Melting point	−26 °C (−15 °F; 247 K)
Boiling point	300 °C (572 °F; 573 K)

Hazards
- GHS labelling
Pictograms	(GHS05: Corrosive) (GHS07: Exclamation mark) (GHS09: Environmental hazard)
Signal word	Warning
Hazard statements	H302, H314, H315, H319, H410, H412
Precautionary statements	P260, P264, P264+P265, P270, P273, P280, P301+P317, P301+P330+P331, P302+P352, P302+P361+P354, P304+P340, P305+P351+P338, P305+P354+P338, P316, P317, P321, P330, P332+P317, P337+P317, P362+P364, P363, P391, P405, P501
- Except where otherwise noted, data are given for materials in their standard state (at 25 °C [77 °F], 100 kPa). Infobox references

Dibenzylamine is an organic compound with the formula (C_{6}H_{5}CH_{2})_{2}NH. It is classified as a secondary amine, being the middle member of the series that includes the primary amine benzylamine (C_{6}H_{5}CH_{2}NH_{2}) and the tertiary amine tribenzylamine ((C_{6}H_{5}CH_{2})_{3}N). It is a colorless oily substance with a faint ammonia-like odor. It is produced as a side product in the hydrogenation of benzonitrile:

2 C_{6}H_{5}CN + 4 H_{2} → NH_{3} + (C_{6}H_{5}CH_{2})_{2}NH

== Selected reactions ==
Amides derived from dibenzylamine are useful in organic synthesis. Dibenzylamine is a typical substrate for C-N coupling reactions related to the Buchwald-Hartwig reaction.
