= Sodium tetrachloropalladate =

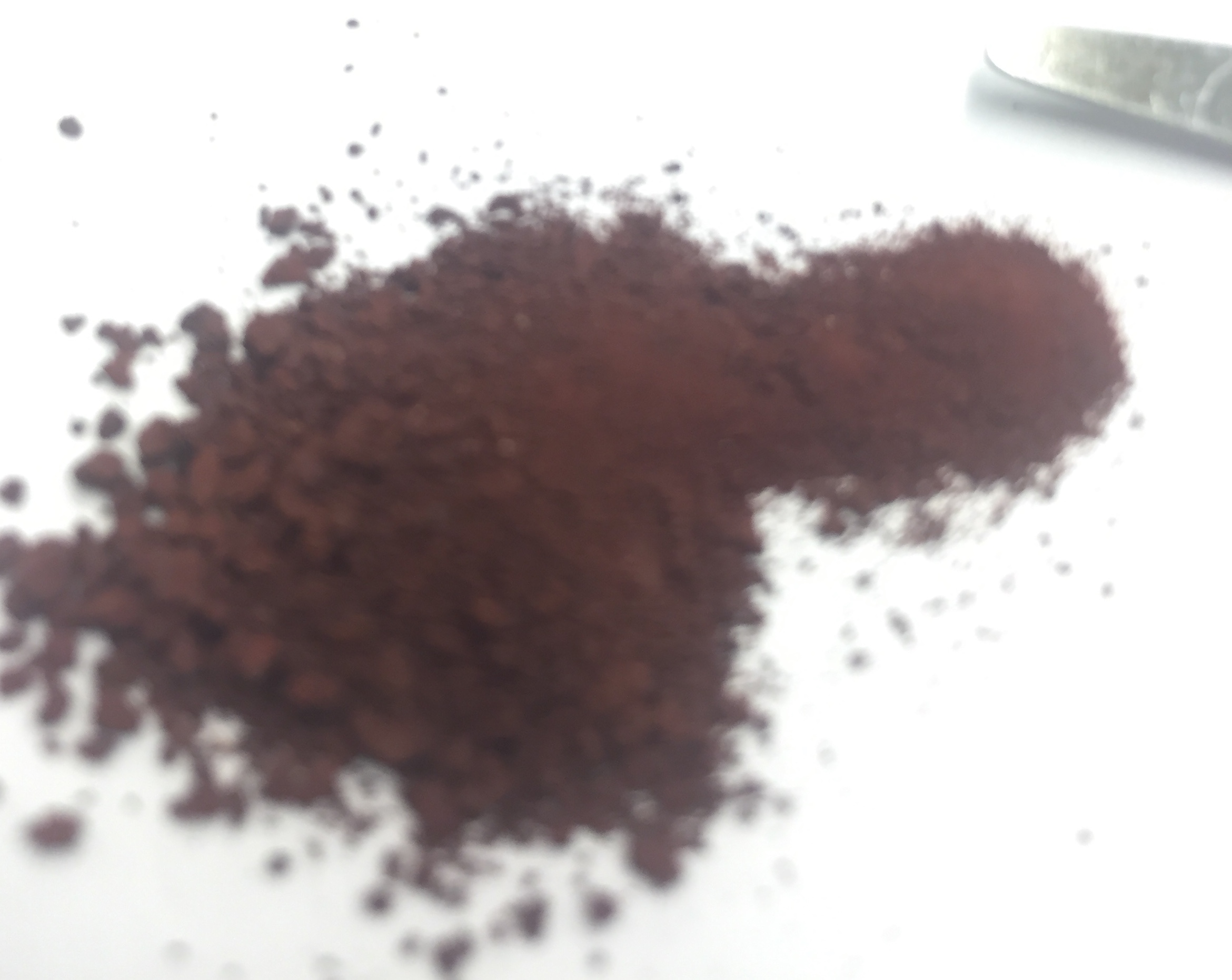

Names
- IUPAC name disodium tetrachloropalladium(2+)
- Other names disodium tetrachloropalladate(II)

Identifiers
CAS Number	13820-53-6
3D model (JSmol)	Interactive image
ChEBI	CHEBI:139495
ChemSpider	21781887
ECHA InfoCard	100.034.079
EC Number	237-502-6
PubChem CID	11000870
CompTox Dashboard (EPA)	DTXSID30893427
- InChI: InChI=1S/4ClH.2Na.Pd/h4*1H;;;/q;;;;2*+1;+6/p-4 Key: ABKQFSYGIHQQLS-UHFFFAOYSA-J; InChI=1S/4ClH.2Na.Pd/h4*1H;;;/q;;;;2*+1;+6/p-4; Key: ABKQFSYGIHQQLS-UHFFFAOYSA-J
- SMILES: [Na+].[Na+].Cl[Pd+2](Cl)(Cl)Cl

Properties
Chemical formula	Cl_{4}Na_{2}Pd
Molar mass	294.20 g·mol^{−1}
Density	2.84 g/cm^{3}

Hazards
- GHS labelling
Pictograms	(GHS05: Corrosive) (GHS06: Toxic) (GHS07: Exclamation mark) (GHS09: Environmental hazard)
Signal word	Danger
Hazard statements	H290, H301, H302, H317, H318, H319, H410
Precautionary statements	P234, P261, P264, P270, P272, P273, P280, P301+P310, P301+P312, P302+P352, P305+P351+P338, P310, P321, P330, P333+P313, P337+P313, P363, P390, P391, P404, P405, P501
- Except where otherwise noted, data are given for materials in their standard state (at 25 °C [77 °F], 100 kPa). verify (what is ?) Infobox references

Sodium tetrachloropalladate is an inorganic compound with the chemical formula Na_{2}PdCl_{4}. The compound crystallizes from water as a reddish-brown trihydrate (Na_{2}PdCl_{4}·3H_{2}O), which is the commercially available form. According to X-ray crystallography, the PdCl_{4}^{2-} centers adopt square planar molecular geometry with Pd-Cl distances of 231 picometers.

== Preparation ==
This salt, and the analogous alkali metal salts of the form M_{2}PdCl_{4}, may be prepared simply by reacting palladium(II) chloride with the appropriate alkali metal chloride in aqueous solution. Palladium(II) chloride is insoluble in water, whereas the product dissolves:

PdCl_{2} + 2 MCl → M_{2}PdCl_{4}

== Related compounds ==
This compound may further react with phosphines to give phosphine complexes of palladium.

An alternative method of preparing such phosphine complexes is to break up the coordination polymer of palladium(II) chloride into reactive, monomeric acetonitrile or benzonitrile complexes, followed by reaction with phosphines.
