= Palladium hexafluoride =

Names
- Other names Palladium(VI) fluoride

Identifiers
3D model (JSmol)	Interactive image
- InChI: InChI=1S/6FH.Pd/h6*1H;/q;;;;;;+6/p-6 Key: MHMVGGBINBRGRB-UHFFFAOYSA-H
- SMILES: F[Pd](F)(F)(F)(F)F

Properties
Chemical formula	F_{6}Pd
Molar mass	220.41 g·mol^{−1}
Appearance	dark red solid

Related compounds
Related compounds	Platinum hexafluoride, osmium hexafluoride
- Except where otherwise noted, data are given for materials in their standard state (at 25 °C [77 °F], 100 kPa). Infobox references

Palladium hexafluoride is an inorganic chemical compound of palladium metal and fluorine with the chemical formula PdF_{6}. It is reported to be a still hypothetical compound. This is one of many palladium fluorides.

== Synthesis ==
Fluorination of palladium powder with atomic fluoride at 900–1700 Pa.

== Physical properties ==
Palladium hexafluoride is predicted to be stable. The compound is reported to form dark red solid that decomposes to PdF_{4}. Palladium hexafluoride is a very powerful oxidizing agent.
