= C21H21N =

The molecular formula C_{21}H_{21}N (molar mass : 287.39 g/mol) may refer to:

- Cyproheptadine, an antihistaminic/anticholinergic and antiserotonergic agent
- Naftifine, an allylamine antifungal drug for the topical treatment of tinea pedis, tinea cruris, and tinea corporis
- Tribenzylamine, a tertiary amine
