= Platinum(II) chloride =

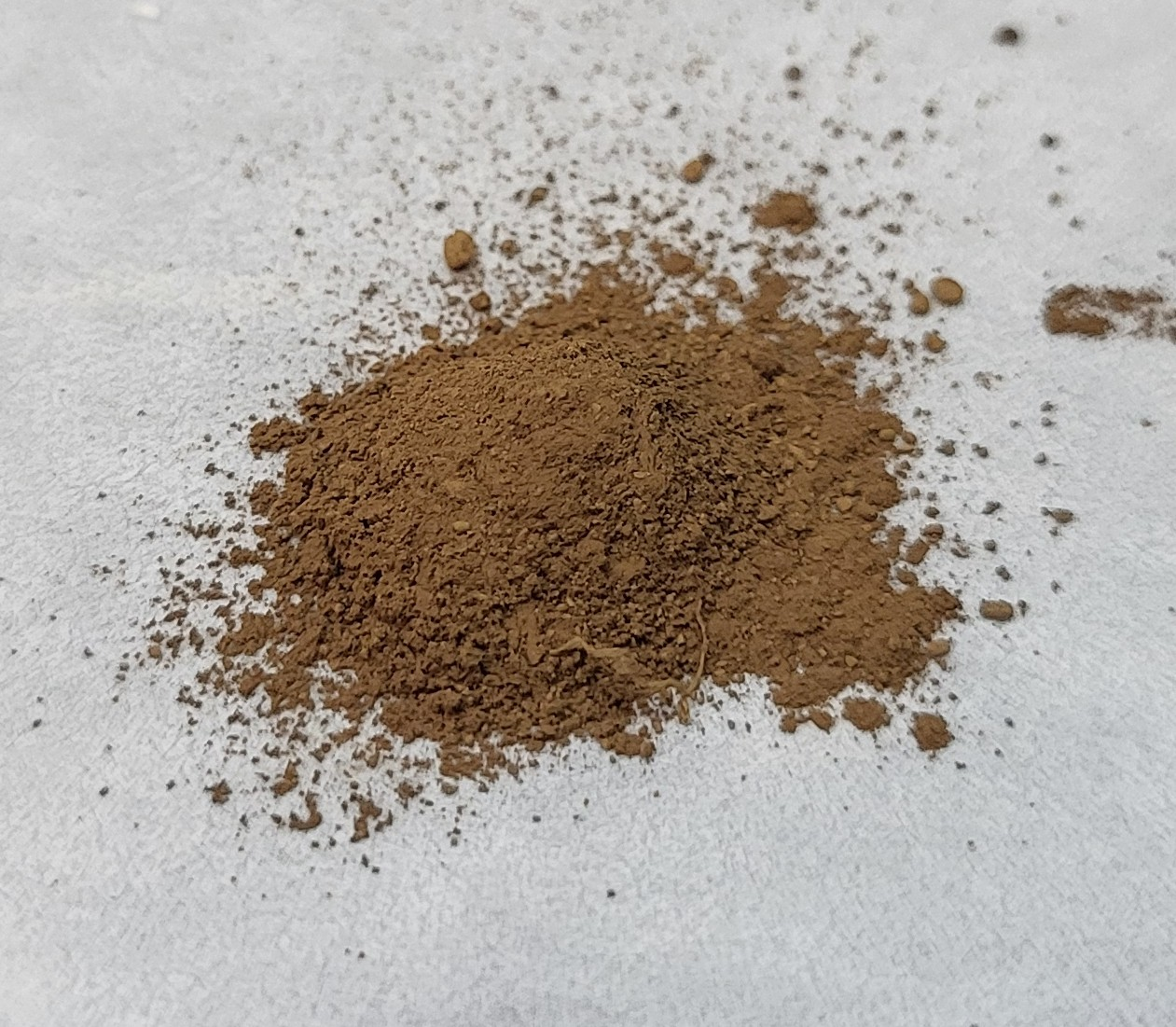

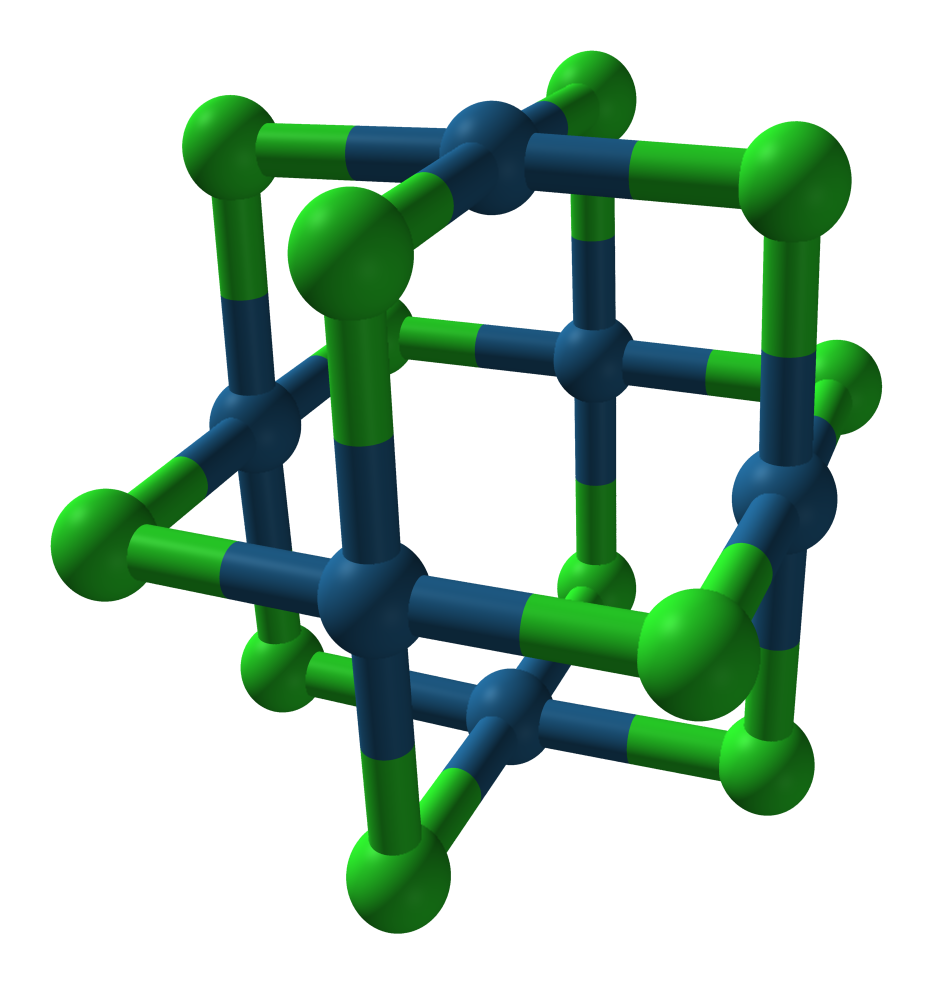
- Ball-and-stick model of a Pt6Cl12 molecule in the beta polymorph of platinum(II) chloride

Names
- IUPAC name Platinum(II) chloride
- Other names Platinous chloride

Identifiers
CAS Number	10025-65-7
3D model (JSmol)	monomer: Interactive image; hexamer: Interactive image
ChEBI	CHEBI:49801
ChemSpider	2668
ECHA InfoCard	100.030.019
EC Number	233-034-1
Gmelin Reference	1744965
PubChem CID	2770
UNII	896SQ4TDHW
CompTox Dashboard (EPA)	DTXSID6064901
- InChI: InChI=1S/2ClH.Pt/h2*1H;/q;;+2/p-2 Key: CLSUSRZJUQMOHH-UHFFFAOYSA-L; InChI=1/2ClH.Pt/h2*1H;/q;;+2/p-2 Key: CLSUSRZJUQMOHH-NUQVWONBAP
- SMILES: monomer: Cl[Pt]Cl; hexamer: [Cl+]0[Pt-2]12[Cl+][Pt-2]34[Cl+][Pt-2]05[Cl+][Pt-2]6([Cl+]1)[Cl+][Pt-2]([Cl+]2)([Cl+]3)[Cl+][Pt-2]([Cl+]4)([Cl+]5)[Cl+]6

Properties
Chemical formula	PtCl_{2}
Molar mass	265.99 g/mol
Appearance	dark brown powder
Density	6.05 g/cm^{3}, solid
Melting point	581 °C (1,078 °F; 854 K)
Boiling point	decomposes
Solubility in water	insoluble
Solubility	insoluble in alcohol, ether soluble in HCl, ammonia
Magnetic susceptibility (χ)	−54.0·10^{−6} cm^{3}/mol

Structure
Crystal structure	hexagonal

Hazards
- GHS labelling
Pictograms	(GHS05: Corrosive) (GHS07: Exclamation mark) (GHS08: Health hazard)
Signal word	Danger
Hazard statements	H314, H315, H317, H319, H334
Precautionary statements	P260, P264, P272, P280, P285, P301+P330+P331, P302+P352, P303+P361+P353, P304+P340, P304+P341, P305+P351+P338, P310, P321, P332+P313, P333+P313, P337+P313, P342+P311, P362, P363, P405, P501
- Lethal dose or concentration (LD, LC)
LD_{50} (median dose)	3423 mg/kg (rat, oral)

Related compounds
Other anions	Platinum(II) bromide Platinum(II) sulfide
Other cations	Palladium(II) chloride
Related compounds	Platinum(IV) chloride
- Except where otherwise noted, data are given for materials in their standard state (at 25 °C [77 °F], 100 kPa). verify (what is ?) Infobox references

Platinum(II) chloride describes the inorganic compounds with the formula PtCl_{2}. They are precursor used in the preparation of other platinum compounds. Platinum(II) chloride exists in two crystalline forms (polymorphs), but the main properties are somewhat similar: dark brown, insoluble in water, diamagnetic, and odorless.

== Structure ==
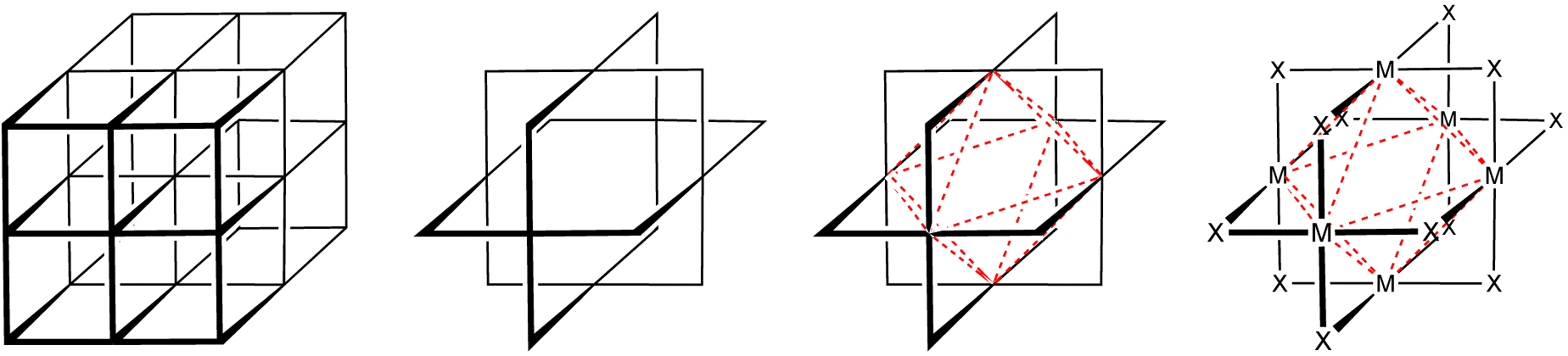
Evolution of β-PtCl_{2} structure: Start with cubic lattice, remove corner and centered lattice points, inscribe octahedron (red lines), label corners as X (twelve Cl^{−} centers) and face-centered atoms as M (six Pt(II) centers).

The structures of PtCl_{2} and PdCl_{2} are similar. These dichlorides exist in both polymeric, or "α", and hexameric, or "β" structures. The β form converts to the α form at 500 °C. In the β form, the Pt-Pt distances are 3.32–3.40 Å, indicative of some bonding between the pairs of metals. In both forms of PtCl_{2}, each Pt center is four-coordinate, being surrounded by four chloride ligands. Complementarily, each Cl center is two-coordinate, being connected to two platinum atoms. The structure of α-PtCl_{2} is reported to be disordered and contain edge- and/or corner-sharing square-planar PtCl_{4} units.

== Preparation ==
β-PtCl_{2} is prepared by heating chloroplatinic acid to 350 °C in air.

H_{2}PtCl_{6} → PtCl_{2} + Cl_{2} + 2 HCl

This method is convenient since the chloroplatinic acid is generated readily from Pt metal. Aqueous solutions of H_{2}PtCl_{6} can also be reduced with hydrazinium salts, but this method is more laborious than the thermal route of Kerr and Schweizer.

Although PtCl_{2} can form when platinum metal contacts hot chlorine gas, this process suffers from over-chlorination to give PtCl_{4}. Berzelius and later Wöhler and Streicher showed that upon heating to 450 °C, this Pt(IV) compound decomposes to the Pt(II) derivative:

PtCl_{4} → PtCl_{2} + Cl_{2}

Transformations such as this are "driven" by entropy, the free energy gained upon the release of a gaseous product from a solid. Upon heating to still higher temperatures, PtCl_{2} releases more chlorine to give metallic Pt. This conversion is the basis of the gravimetric assay of the purity of the PtCl_{2} product.

== Reactions ==
Most reactions of PtCl_{2} proceed via treatment with ligands (L) to give molecular derivatives. These transformations entail depolymerization via cleavage of Pt-Cl-Pt linkages:

PtCl_{2} + 2 L → PtCl_{2}L_{2}

Addition of ammonia gives initially "PtCl_{2}(NH_{3})_{2}", "Magnus's green salt", also described as [Pt(NH_{3})_{4}][PtCl_{4}].

Many complexes have been described, the following are illustrative:

- pink K_{2}PtCl_{4}, a widely employed water-soluble derivative.
- colorless cis-PtCl_{2}(NH_{3})_{2}, better known as cisplatin.
- colorless cis-PtCl_{2}(P(C_{6}H_{5})_{3})_{2}, a common precursor to other complexes of the type PtX(Cl)(P(C_{6}H_{5})_{3})_{2} (X = H, CH_{3}, etc.).
- yellow trans-PtCl_{2}(P(C_{6}H_{5})_{3})_{2}, a metastable relative of the cis- isomer.
- colorless dichloro(cycloocta-1,5-diene)platinum(II) (Pt(cod)Cl_{2}), an "organic-soluble" compound containing a labile organic ligand.

Several of these compounds are of interest in homogeneous catalysis in the service of organic synthesis or as anti-cancer drugs.
