= Palladium(II) chloride =

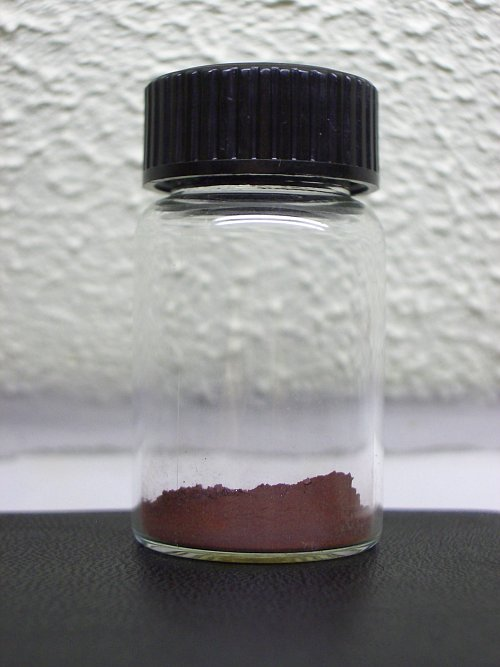
- Palladium(II) chloride Palladium dichloride

Names
- Other names Palladium dichloride, Palladous chloride

Identifiers
CAS Number	7647-10-1
3D model (JSmol)	monomer: Interactive image; chain (α-form): Interactive image; hexamer (β-form): Interactive image
ChemSpider	22710
ECHA InfoCard	100.028.724
EC Number	231-596-2
PubChem CID	24290
RTECS number	RT3500000
UNII	N9214IR8N7
CompTox Dashboard (EPA)	DTXSID4025824
- InChI: InChI=1S/2ClH.Pd/h2*1H;/q;;+2/p-2 Key: PIBWKRNGBLPSSY-UHFFFAOYSA-L
- SMILES: monomer: Cl[Pd]Cl; chain (α-form): Cl[Pd-2](Cl)([Cl+]1)[Cl+][Pd-2]1([Cl+]1)[Cl+][Pd-2]1([Cl+]1)[Cl+][Pd-2]1([Cl+]1)[Cl+][Pd-2]1([Cl+]1)[Cl+][Pd-2]1([Cl+]1)[Cl+][Pd-2]1([Cl+]1)[Cl+][Pd-2]1([Cl+]1)[Cl+][Pd-2]1([Cl+]1)[Cl+][Pd-2]1([Cl+]1)[Cl+][Pd-2]1([Cl+]1)[Cl+][Pd-2]1(Cl)Cl; hexamer (β-form): [Cl+]0[Pd-2]12[Cl+][Pd-2]34[Cl+][Pd-2]05[Cl+][Pd-2]6([Cl+]1)[Cl+][Pd-2]([Cl+]2)([Cl+]3)[Cl+][Pd-2]([Cl+]4)([Cl+]5)[Cl+]6

Properties
Chemical formula	PdCl_{2}
Molar mass	177.326 g/mol (anhydrous); 213.357 g/mol (dihydrate)
Appearance	dark red solid hygroscopic (anhydrous) dark brown crystals (dihydrate)
Density	4.0 g/cm^{3}
Melting point	679 °C (1,254 °F; 952 K) (decomposes)
Solubility in water	soluble in trace amounts, better solubility in cold water
Solubility	soluble in organic solvents dissolves rapidly in HCl
Magnetic susceptibility (χ)	−38.0×10^{−6} cm^{3}/mol

Structure
Crystal structure	rhombohedral
Coordination geometry	square planar

Hazards
- GHS labelling
Pictograms	(GHS05: Corrosive) (GHS06: Toxic) (GHS07: Exclamation mark) (GHS09: Environmental hazard)
Signal word	Danger
Hazard statements	H290, H301, H302, H315, H317, H318, H319, H335, H410
Precautionary statements	P234, P261, P264, P264+P265, P270, P271, P272, P273, P280, P301+P316, P301+P317, P302+P352, P304+P340, P305+P351+P338, P305+P354+P338, P317, P319, P321, P330, P333+P317, P337+P317, P362+P364, P390, P391, P403+P233, P405, P501
Flash point	Non-flammable
- Lethal dose or concentration (LD, LC)
LD_{50} (median dose)	2704 mg/kg (rat, oral)

Related compounds
Other anions	Palladium(II) fluoride Palladium(II) bromide Palladium(II) iodide
Other cations	Nickel(II) chloride Platinum(II) chloride Platinum(II,IV) chloride Platinum(IV) chloride
- Except where otherwise noted, data are given for materials in their standard state (at 25 °C [77 °F], 100 kPa). verify (what is ?) Infobox references

Palladium(II) chloride, also known as palladium dichloride and palladous chloride, are the chemical compounds with the formula PdCl_{2}. PdCl_{2} is a common starting material in palladium chemistry – palladium-based catalysts are of particular value in organic synthesis. It is prepared by the reaction of chlorine with palladium metal at high temperatures.

== Structure ==
Two forms of PdCl_{2} are known, denoted α and β. In both forms, the palladium centres adopt a square-planar coordination geometry that is characteristic of Pd(II). Furthermore, in both forms, the Pd(II) centers are linked by μ_{2}-chloride bridges. The α-form of PdCl_{2} is a polymer, consisting of "infinite" slabs or chains. The β-form of PdCl_{2} is molecular, consisting of an octahedral cluster of six Pd atoms. Each of the twelve edges of this octahedron is spanned by Cl^{−}. PtCl_{2} adopts similar structures, whereas NiCl_{2} adopts the CdCl_{2} motif, featuring hexacoordinated Ni(II).

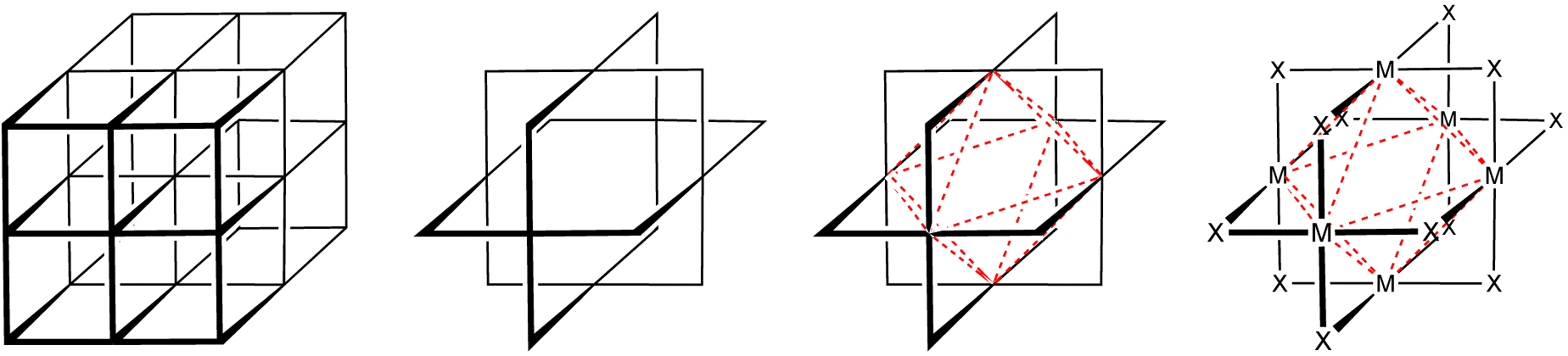
Evolution of β-PdCl_{2} structure: Start with cubic lattice, remove corner and centered lattice points, inscribe octahedron (red lines), label corners as X (twelve Cl^{−} centers) and face-centered atoms as M (six Pd(II) centers).

ball-and-stick model of the crystal structure of α-PdCl_{2}	thermal ellipsoid model of the Pd_{6}Cl_{12} molecule found in the crystal structure of β-PdCl_{2}

Two further polymorphs, γ-PdCl_{2} and δ-PdCl_{2}, have been reported and show negative thermal expansion. The high-temperature δ form contains planar ribbons of edge-connected PdCl_{4} squares, like α-PdCl_{2}. The low-temperature γ form has corrugated layers of corner-connected PdCl_{4} squares.

== Preparation ==
Palladium(II) chloride is prepared by dissolving palladium metal in aqua regia or hydrochloric acid in the presence of chlorine. Alternatively, it may be prepared by heating palladium sponge metal with chlorine gas at 500 °C.

== Reactions ==
Palladium(II) chloride is a common starting point in the synthesis of other palladium compounds. It is not particularly soluble in water or non-coordinating solvents, so the first step in its utilization is often the preparation of labile but soluble Lewis base adducts, such as bis(benzonitrile)palladium dichloride and bis(acetonitrile)palladium dichloride. These complexes are prepared by treating PdCl_{2} with hot solutions of the nitriles:

PdCl_{2} + 2 RCN → PdCl_{2}(RCN)_{2}

Although occasionally recommended, inert-gas techniques are not necessary if the complex is to be used in situ. As an example, bis(triphenylphosphine)palladium(II) dichloride may be prepared from palladium(II) chloride by reacting it with triphenylphosphine in benzonitrile:

PdCl_{2} + 2 PPh_{3} → PdCl_{2}(PPh_{3})_{2}

Further reduction in the presence of more triphenylphosphine gives tetrakis(triphenylphosphine)palladium(0); the second reaction may be carried out without purifying the intermediate dichloride:

PdCl_{2}(PPh_{3})_{2} + 2 PPh_{3} + 5/2 N_{2}H_{4} → Pd(PPh_{3})_{4} + 1/2 N_{2} + 2 N_{2}H^{+}_{5}Cl^{−}

Alternatively, palladium(II) chloride may be solubilized in the form of the tetrachloropalladate(II) anion, such as in sodium tetrachloropalladate, by reacting with the appropriate alkali metal chloride in water: Palladium(II) chloride is insoluble in water, whereas the product dissolves:

PdCl_{2} + 2 MCl → M_{2}PdCl_{4}

This compound may also further react with phosphines to give phosphine complexes of palladium.

Palladium chloride may also be used to give heterogeneous palladium catalysts: palladium on barium sulfate, palladium on carbon, and palladium chloride on carbon.

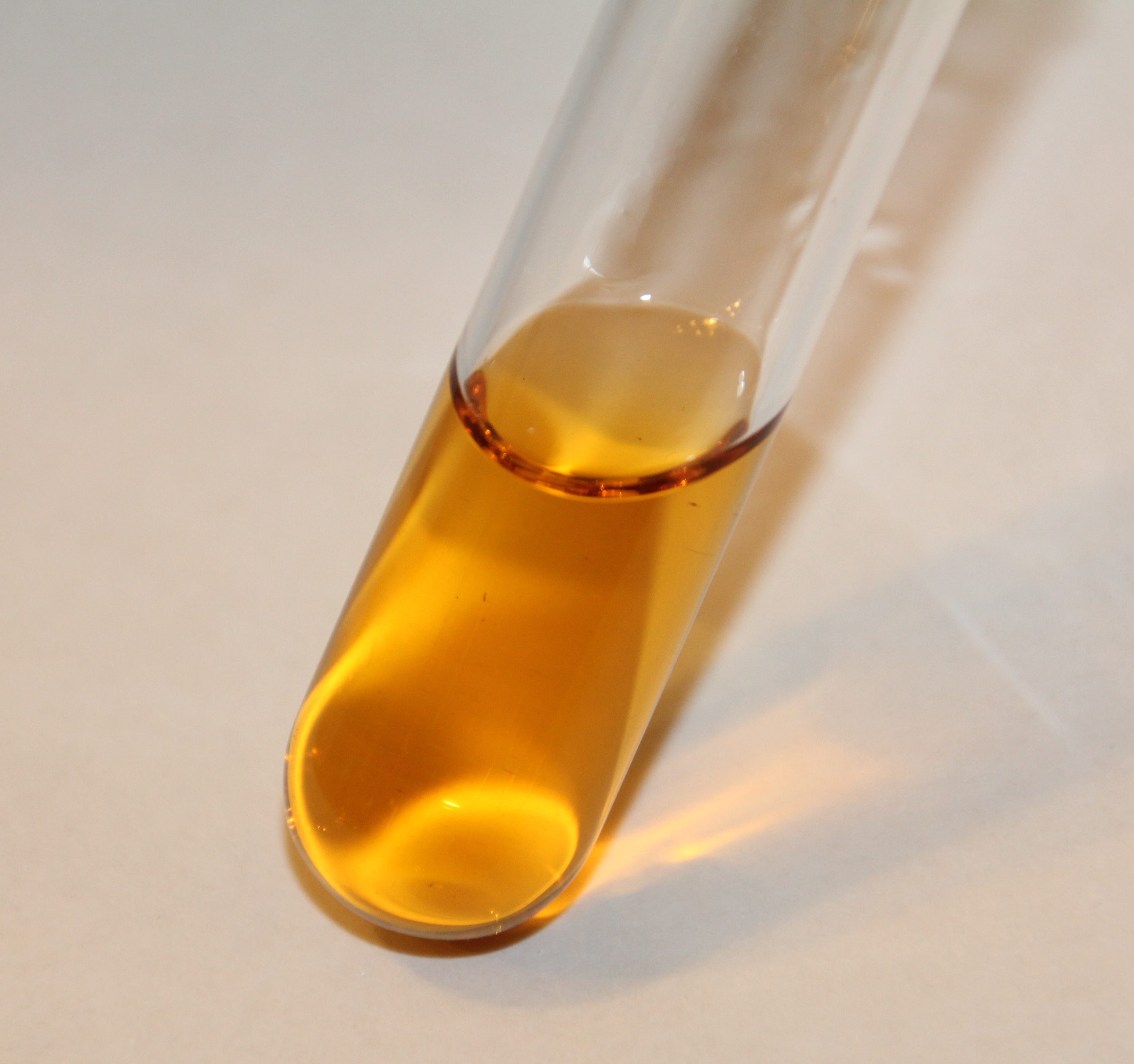
A solution of [PdCl_{4}]^{2−}(aq)

== Uses ==
Even when dry, palladium(II) chloride is able to rapidly stain stainless steel. Thus, palladium(II) chloride solutions are sometimes used to test for the corrosion-resistance of stainless steel.

Palladium(II) chloride is sometimes used in carbon monoxide detectors. Carbon monoxide reduces palladium(II) chloride to palladium:

PdCl_{2} + CO + H_{2}O → Pd + CO_{2} + 2HCl

Residual PdCl_{2} is converted to red PdI_{2}, the concentration of which may be determined colorimetrically:

PdCl_{2} + 2 KI → PdI_{2} + 2 KCl

Palladium(II) chloride is used in the Wacker process for production of aldehydes and ketones from alkenes.

Palladium(II) chloride can also be used for the cosmetic tattooing of leukomas in the cornea.
