= Palladium(II,IV) fluoride =

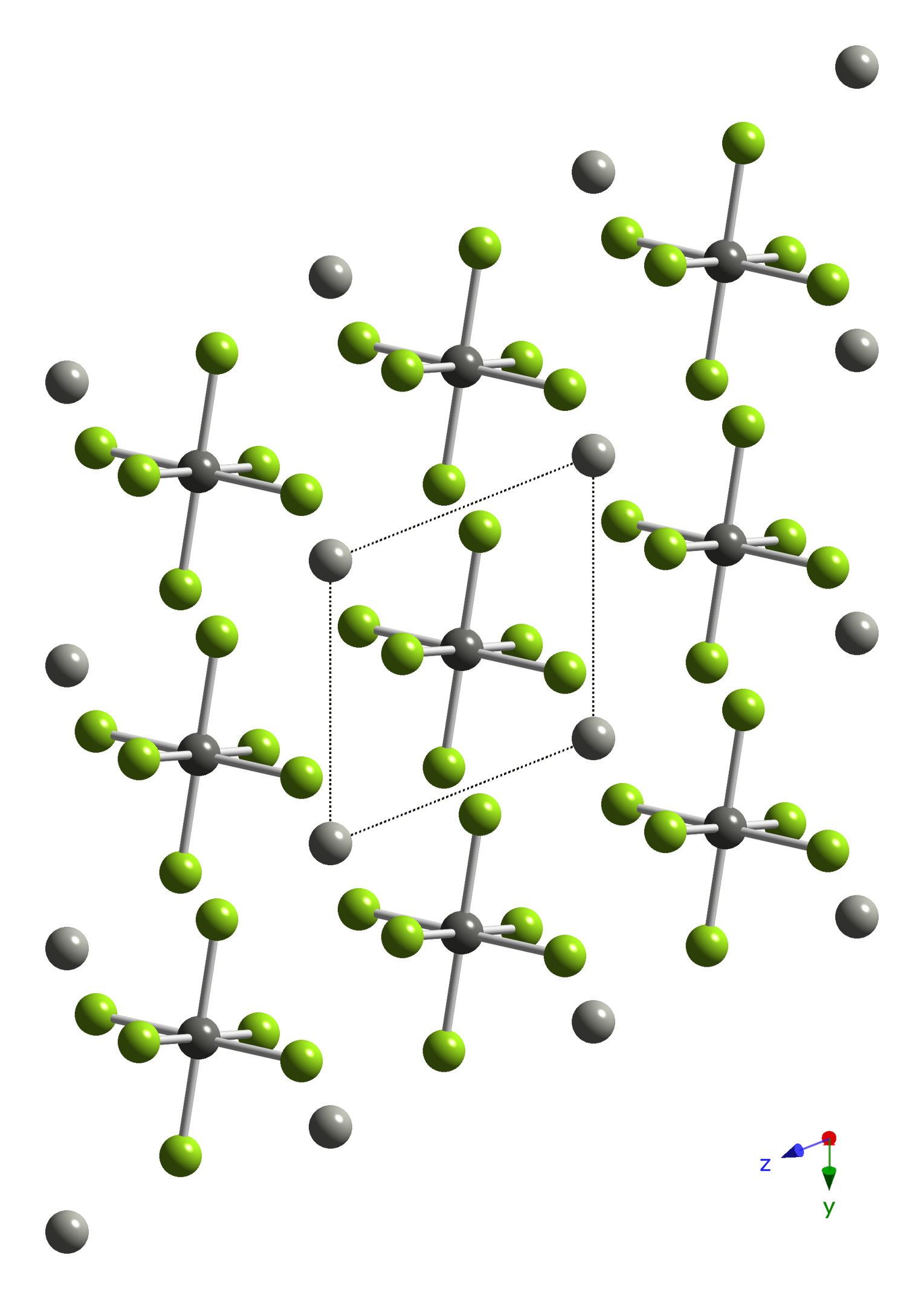
- Crystal structure

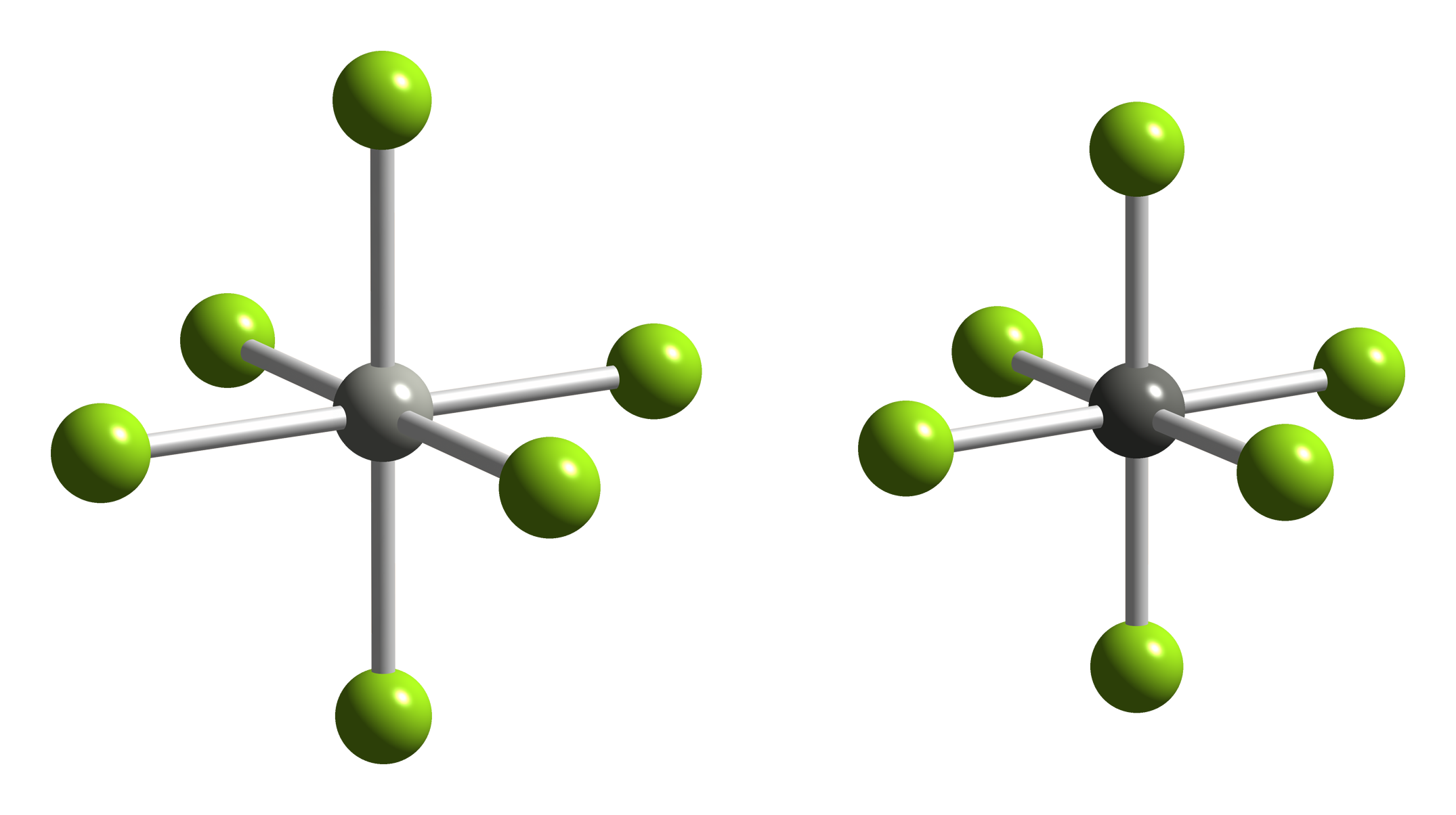
- Coordination environment of Pd^{II} and Pd^{IV} showing different distances to F atoms

Names
- Other names palladium(II) hexafluoropalladate(IV)

Identifiers
CAS Number	12021-58-8
3D model (JSmol)	Interactive image
PubChem CID	57434144
CompTox Dashboard (EPA)	DTXSID101045628
- InChI: InChI=1S/6FH.2Pd/h6*1H;;/q;;;;;;+2;+4/p-6 Key: LRWQWDMZTSEXJX-UHFFFAOYSA-H
- SMILES: [Pd+2].[F-][Pd+4]([F-])([F-])([F-])([F-])[F-]

Properties
Chemical formula	F_{3}Pd
Molar mass	163.42 g·mol^{−1}
Appearance	black solid
Magnetic susceptibility (χ)	+1760.0·10^{−6} cm^{3}/mol

Structure
Crystal structure	rhombohedral
Coordination geometry	octahedral

Related compounds
Other cations	Nickel(III) fluoride
Related compounds	Palladium(II) fluoride Palladium(IV) fluoride
- Except where otherwise noted, data are given for materials in their standard state (at 25 °C [77 °F], 100 kPa). verify (what is ?) Infobox references

Palladium(II,IV) fluoride, also known as palladium trifluoride, is a chemical compound of palladium and fluorine. It has the empirical formula PdF_{3}, but is better described as the mixed-valence compound palladium(II) hexafluoropalladate(IV), Pd^{II}[Pd^{IV}F_{6}], and is often written as Pd[PdF_{6}] or Pd_{2}F_{6}.

== Structure and properties ==
Pd[PdF_{6}] is paramagnetic, and both Pd(II) and Pd(IV) occupy octahedral sites in the crystal structure. The Pd^{II}-F distance is 2.17 Å, whereas the Pd^{IV}-F distance is 1.90 Å.

== Synthesis ==
Pd[PdF_{6}] is the most stable product of the reaction of fluorine and metallic palladium.

2 Pd + 3 F_{2} → Pd[PdF_{6}]

== See also ==
- Palladium fluoride
