= Bis(acetonitrile)palladium dichloride =

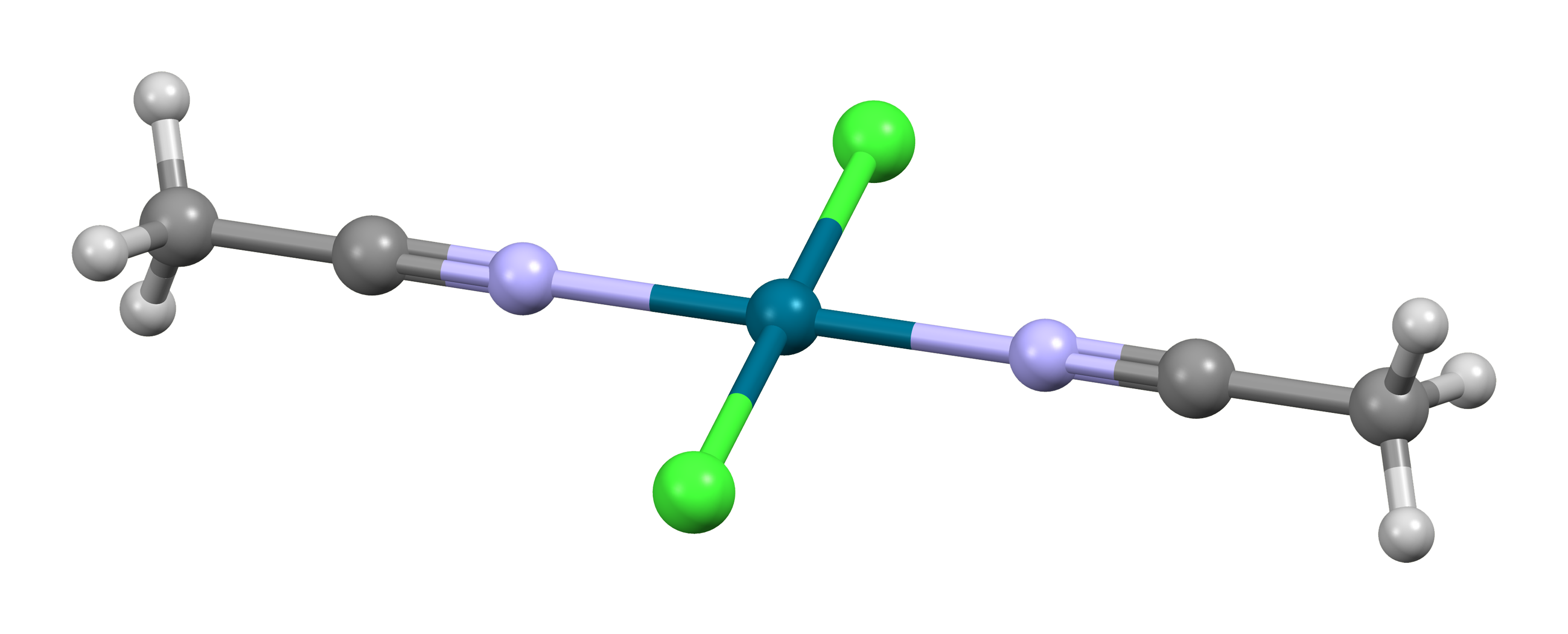

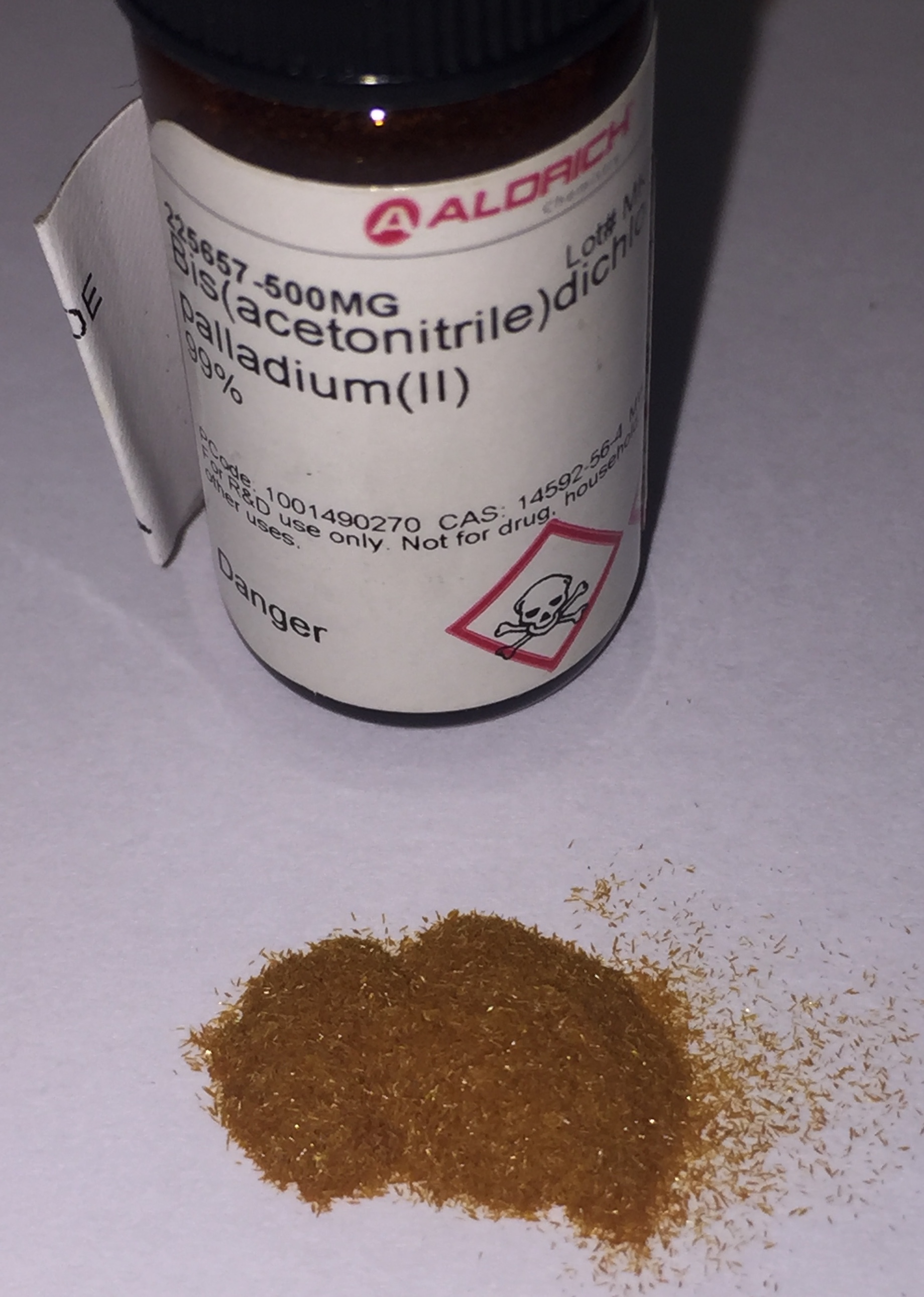

Names
- Other names palladium dichloride bis(acetonitrile), bis(acetonitrile)dichloropalladium

Identifiers
CAS Number	14592-56-4
3D model (JSmol)	ionic form: Interactive image; coordination form: Interactive image
ChemSpider	76265
ECHA InfoCard	100.035.110
EC Number	238-637-3
PubChem CID	6093782
CompTox Dashboard (EPA)	DTXSID80932719
- InChI: InChI=1S/2C2H3N.2ClH.Pd/c2*1-2-3;;;/h2*1H3;2*1H;/q;;;;+2/p-2 Key: RBYGDVHOECIAFC-UHFFFAOYSA-L
- SMILES: ionic form: CC#N.CC#N.Cl[Pd]Cl; coordination form: Cl[Pd-2](Cl)([N+]#CC)[N+]#CC

Properties
Chemical formula	C_{4}H_{6}Cl_{2}N_{2}Pd
Molar mass	259.43 g·mol^{−1}
Appearance	yellow-brown
Melting point	129–131 °C (264–268 °F; 402–404 K)

Hazards
- GHS labelling
Pictograms	(GHS06: Toxic) (GHS07: Exclamation mark)
Signal word	Danger
Hazard statements	H301, H311, H330
Precautionary statements	P260, P264, P270, P271, P273, P280, P284, P301+P310, P301+P312, P302+P352, P304+P312, P304+P340, P305+P351+P338, P310, P311, P312, P320, P321, P330, P332+P313, P337+P313, P361, P362, P363, P403+P233, P405, P501
- Except where otherwise noted, data are given for materials in their standard state (at 25 °C [77 °F], 100 kPa). Infobox references

Bis(acetonitrile)palladium dichloride is the coordination complex with the formula PdCl_{2}(NCCH_{3})_{2}. It is the adduct of two acetonitrile ligands with palladium(II) chloride. It is a yellow-brown solid that is soluble in organic solvents. The compound is a reagent and a catalyst for reactions that require soluble Pd(II). The compound is similar to bis(benzonitrile)palladium dichloride. It reacts with 1,5-cyclooctadiene to give dichloro(1,5-cyclooctadiene)palladium.
