= Palladium tetrafluoride =

Palladium(IV) fluoride
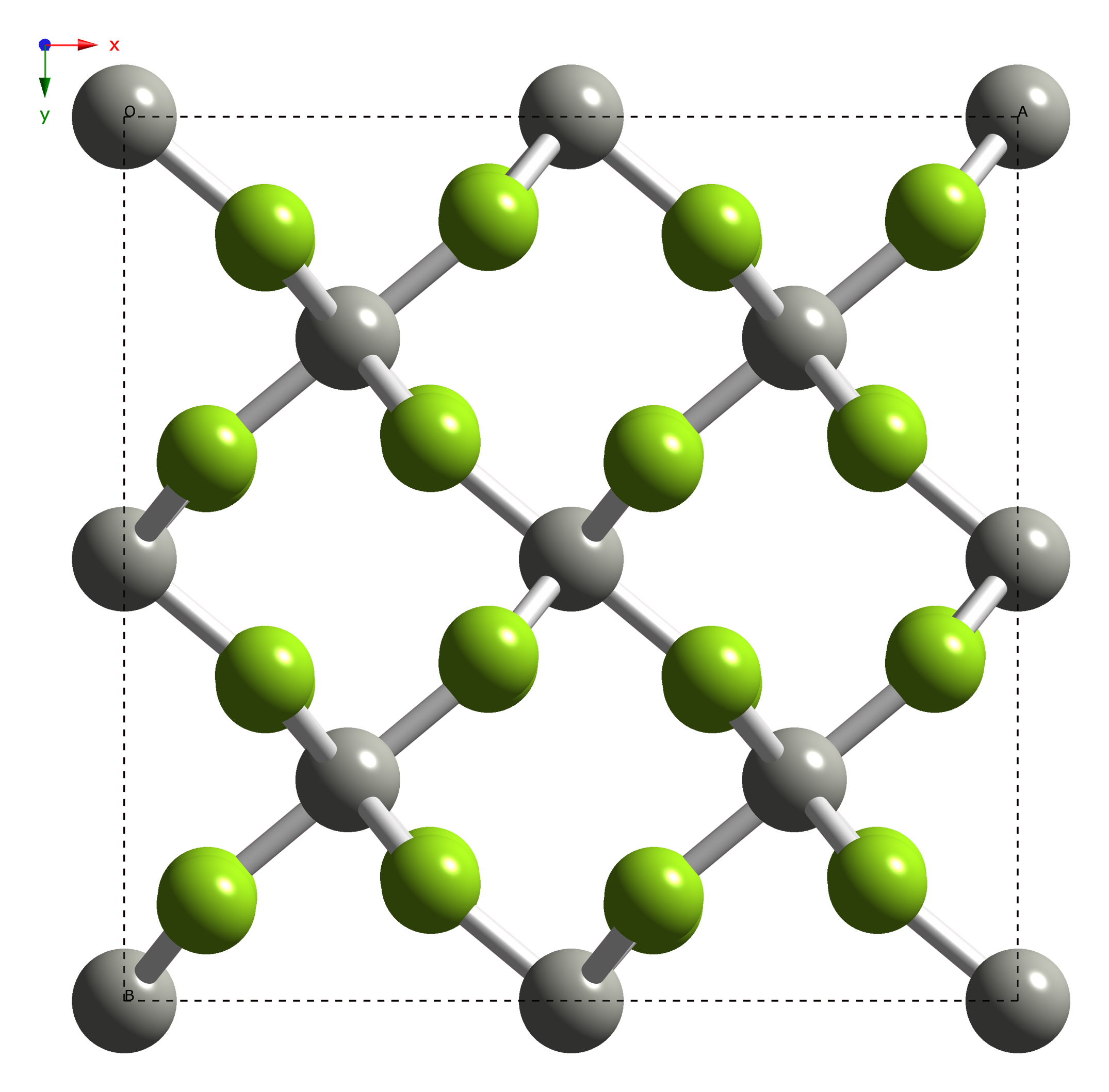

Identifiers
CAS Number	13709-55-2
3D model (JSmol)	Interactive image
ChemSpider	24771345
PubChem CID	101085592
- InChI: InChI=1S/4FH.Pd/h4*1H;/p-4 Key: TZSYMMIYHWWKKM-UHFFFAOYSA-J
- SMILES: [F-].[F-].[F-].[F-].[Pd]

Properties
Chemical formula	F_{4}Pd
Molar mass	182.41 g·mol^{−1}
Appearance	pink or brick-red crystalline solid

Related compounds
Other cations	Platinum(IV) fluoride
Related compounds	Palladium(II) fluoride Palladium(II,IV) fluoride
- Except where otherwise noted, data are given for materials in their standard state (at 25 °C [77 °F], 100 kPa). verify (what is ?) Infobox references

Palladium (IV) fluoride, also known as palladium tetrafluoride, is the chemical compound of palladium and fluorine with the chemical formula PdF_{4}. The palladium atoms in PdF_{4} are in the +4 oxidation state.

== Structure ==
Crystals are composed of octahedral PdF6 units, with four fluorides from each octahedron shared (bridging between octahedra).

== Synthesis ==
Palladium tetrafluoride has been prepared by reacting palladium(II,IV) fluoride with fluorine gas at pressures around 7 atm and at 300 °C for several days.

== Reactivity ==
PdF_{4} is a strong oxidising agent and undergoes rapid hydrolysis in moist air.

== See also ==
- Palladium fluorides
