= Benzaldehyde oxime =

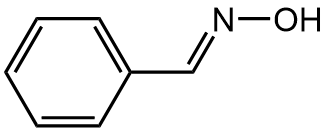

Names
- Other names Benzaldoxime

Identifiers
CAS Number	932-90-1; (Z): 622-32-2; (E): 622-31-1
3D model (JSmol)	(Z): Interactive image; (E): Interactive image
ChEMBL	(Z): ChEMBL265435; (E): ChEMBL135583
ChemSpider	(Z): 4481994; (E): 4482130
ECHA InfoCard	100.012.056
EC Number	213-261-2
PubChem CID	(Z): 5324470; (E): 5324611
UNII	(Z): YR8F3Q0KSH; (E): TBP7JJ5HTH
CompTox Dashboard (EPA)	DTXSID6061313
- InChI: (Z): InChI=1S/C7H7NO/c9-8-6-7-4-2-1-3-5-7/h1-6,9H/b8-6- Key: VTWKXBJHBHYJBI-VURMDHGXSA-N; (E): InChI=1S/C7H7NO/c9-8-6-7-4-2-1-3-5-7/h1-6,9H/b8-6+ Key: VTWKXBJHBHYJBI-SOFGYWHQSA-N
- SMILES: (Z): C1=CC=C(C=C1)\C=N/O; (E): C1=CC=C(C=C1)/C=N/O

Properties
Chemical formula	C_{7}H_{7}NO
Appearance	White solid
Melting point	(Z) 33 °C (E) 133 °C
- Except where otherwise noted, data are given for materials in their standard state (at 25 °C [77 °F], 100 kPa). Infobox references

Benzaldehyde oxime is an organic compound with the formula C_{7}H_{7}NO. Benzaldehyde oxime can be synthesized from benzaldehyde and hydroxylamine hydrochloride in presence of a base. The reaction at room temperature in methanol gives 9% E-isomer and 82% Z-isomer.

== Reactions ==
Benzaldehyde oxime undergoes Beckmann rearrangement to form benzamide, catalyzed by nickel salts or photocatalyzed by BODIPY. Its dehydration yields benzonitrile. It can be hydrolyzed to regenerate benzaldehyde.

It reacts with N-chlorosuccinimide in DMF to form benzohydroximoyl chloride, in which chlorine replaces hydrogen on the carbon attached to the nitrogen in benzaldehyde oxime.
