= Platinum(IV) bromide =

Names
- IUPAC name Platinum(IV) bromide
- Other names Platinic bromide

Identifiers
CAS Number	68938-92-1
3D model (JSmol)	Interactive image
ChemSpider	100307
ECHA InfoCard	100.066.481
EC Number	273-151-5
PubChem CID	111865
CompTox Dashboard (EPA)	DTXSID90988666
- InChI: InChI=1S/4BrH.Pt/h4*1H;/q;;;;+4/p-4 Key: SNPHNDVOPWUNON-UHFFFAOYSA-J
- SMILES: Br[Pt](Br)(Br)Br

Properties
Chemical formula	PtBr_{4}
Molar mass	514.694 g/mol
Appearance	brownish-black crystals
Melting point	decomposes at 180°C
Solubility in water	0.41 g/100mL @ 20°C
Solubility	slightly soluble in ethanol, diethyl ether

Hazards
- GHS labelling
Pictograms	(GHS05: Corrosive)
Signal word	Danger
Hazard statements	H314
Precautionary statements	P260, P264, P280, P301+P330+P331, P303+P361+P353, P304+P340, P305+P351+P338, P310, P321, P363, P405, P501
NFPA 704 (fire diamond)	2 0 1
Flash point	non-flammable
- Safety data sheet (SDS)

Related compounds
Other anions	Platinum(IV) fluoride Platinum(IV) chloride Platinum(IV) iodide
Other cations	Nickel(II) bromide Palladium(II) bromide
Related compounds	Platinum(II) bromide
- Except where otherwise noted, data are given for materials in their standard state (at 25 °C [77 °F], 100 kPa). verify (what is ?) Infobox references

Platinum(IV) bromide is the inorganic compound with the formula PtBr_{4}. It is a brown solid. It is a little-used compound mainly of interest for academic research. It is a component of a reagent used in qualitative inorganic analysis.

In terms of structure, the compound is an inorganic polymer consisting of interconnected PtBr_{6} octahedra.
