= Palladium(II) iodide =

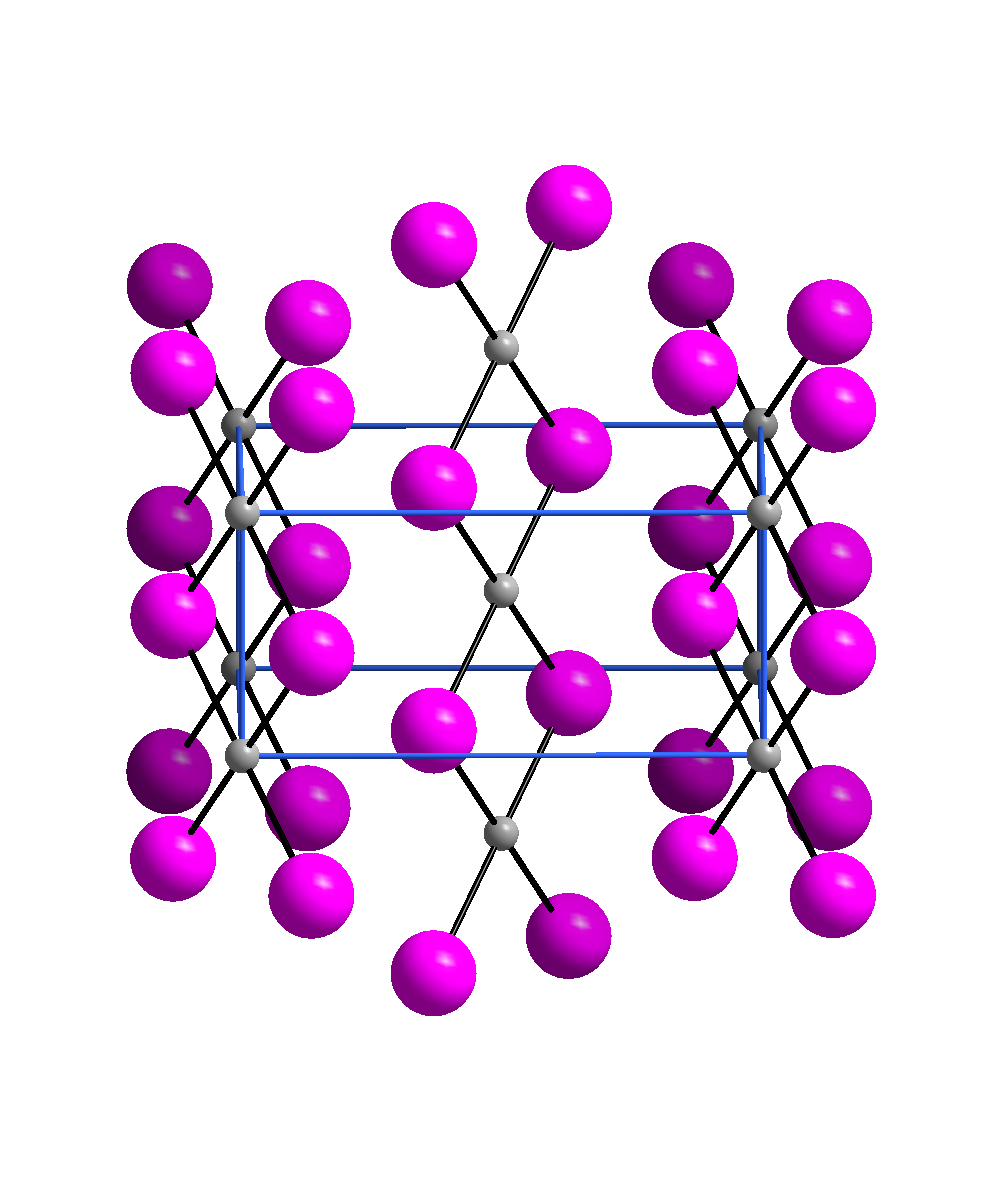

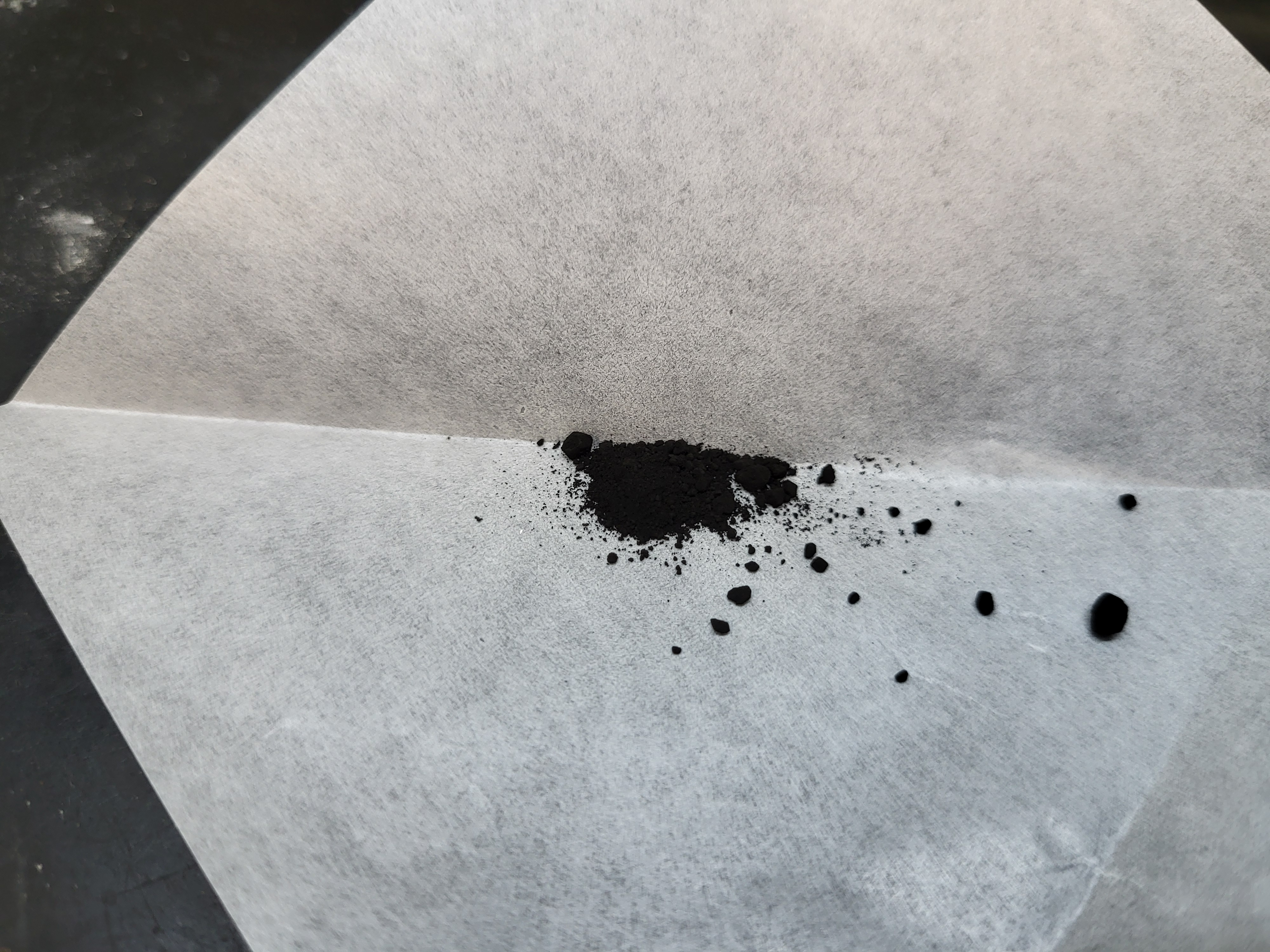

Identifiers
CAS Number	7790-38-7
3D model (JSmol)	Interactive image
ChemSpider	74228
ECHA InfoCard	100.029.276
EC Number	232-203-7
PubChem CID	82251
CompTox Dashboard (EPA)	DTXSID90999090
- InChI: InChI=1S/2HI.Pd/h2*1H;/q;;+2/p-2 Key: HNNUTDROYPGBMR-UHFFFAOYSA-L; InChI=1/2HI.Pd/h2*1H;/q;;+2/p-2 Key: HNNUTDROYPGBMR-NUQVWONBAU
- SMILES: [Pd](I)I

Properties
Chemical formula	I_{2}Pd
Molar mass	360.229 g/mol
Appearance	Black crystals
Density	6,003 g/cm^{3}
Melting point	350 °C (decomposes)
Solubility in water	Insoluble in water

Hazards
- GHS labelling
Pictograms	(GHS07: Exclamation mark)
Signal word	Warning
Hazard statements	H315, H319, H335

Related compounds
Other anions	Palladium(II) fluoride Palladium(II) chloride Palladium(II) bromide
- Except where otherwise noted, data are given for materials in their standard state (at 25 °C [77 °F], 100 kPa). verify (what is ?) Infobox references

Palladium(II) iodide is an inorganic compound of palladium and iodine. It is commercially available, though less common than palladium(II) chloride, the usual entry point to palladium chemistry. Three polymorphs are known.

== Structure ==
Palladium(II) iodide is an almost X-ray amorphous black powder. The α-modification has an orthorhombic crystal structure with the space group Pnmn(space group no. 58, position 5).

== Preparation ==
Palladium(II) iodide can be obtained by treating a dilute solution of palladium in nitric acid with sodium iodide at 80 °C.

The high-temperature polymorph α-palladium(II) iodide can be produced by reaction of the elements at temperature above 600 °C. The γ-modification is produced as an almost amorphous powder by addition of iodide salts to aqueous H_{2}PdCl_{4} solution. When heated in dilute hydrogen iodide solution, this polymorph transforms into the β phase at around 140 °C.

== Reactions and uses ==
Palladium(II) iodide is insoluble in water. It reacts with iodide giving PdI_{4}^{2−} anion:

PdI_{2} + 2I^{−} → PdI^{2−}_{4}

It finds use as a catalyst.

Historically, the quantity of palladium in a solution may be determined gravimetrically by precipitation as palladium(II) iodide.
