= Bis(benzonitrile)palladium dichloride =

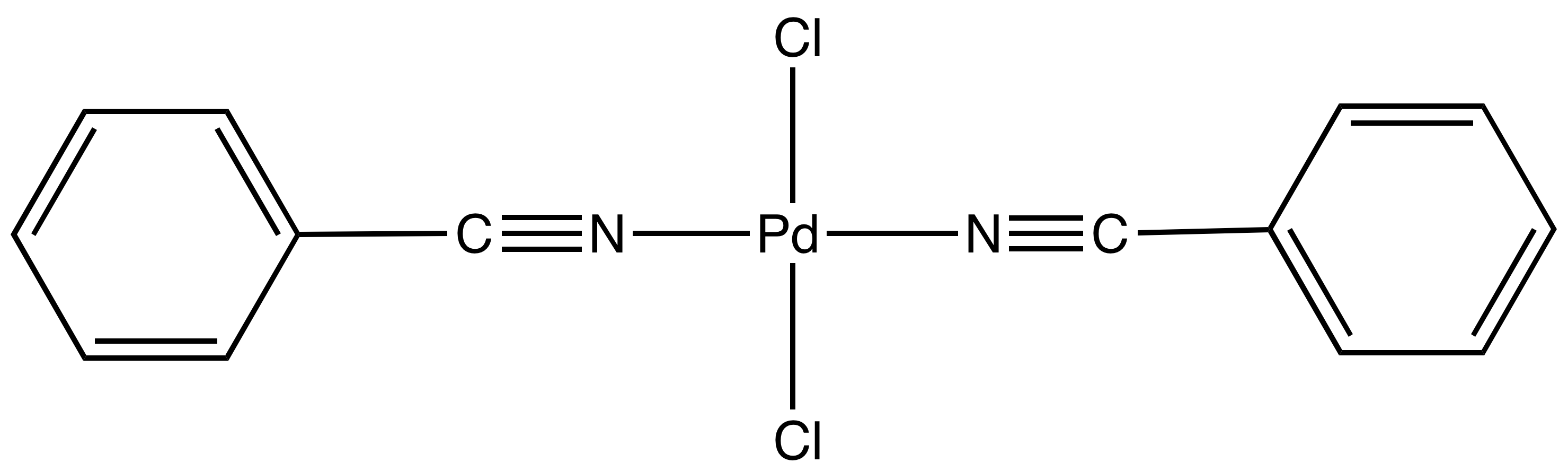

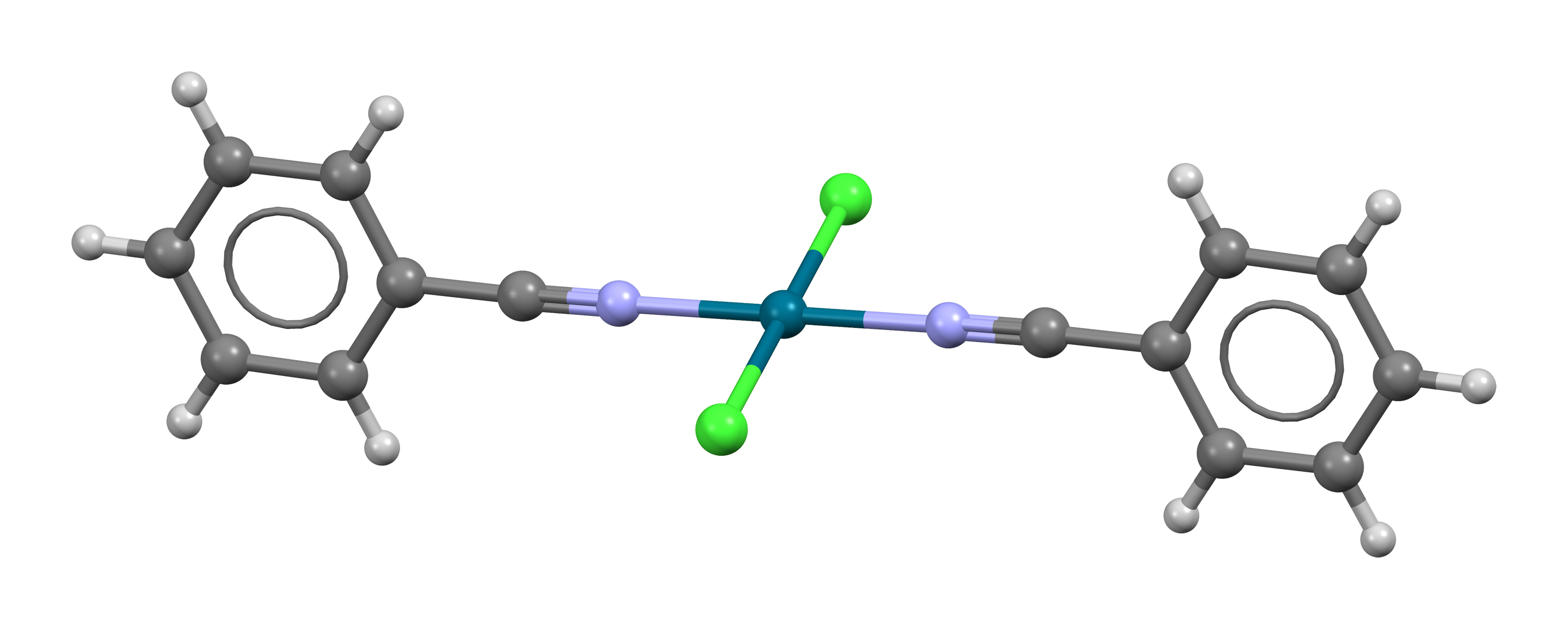

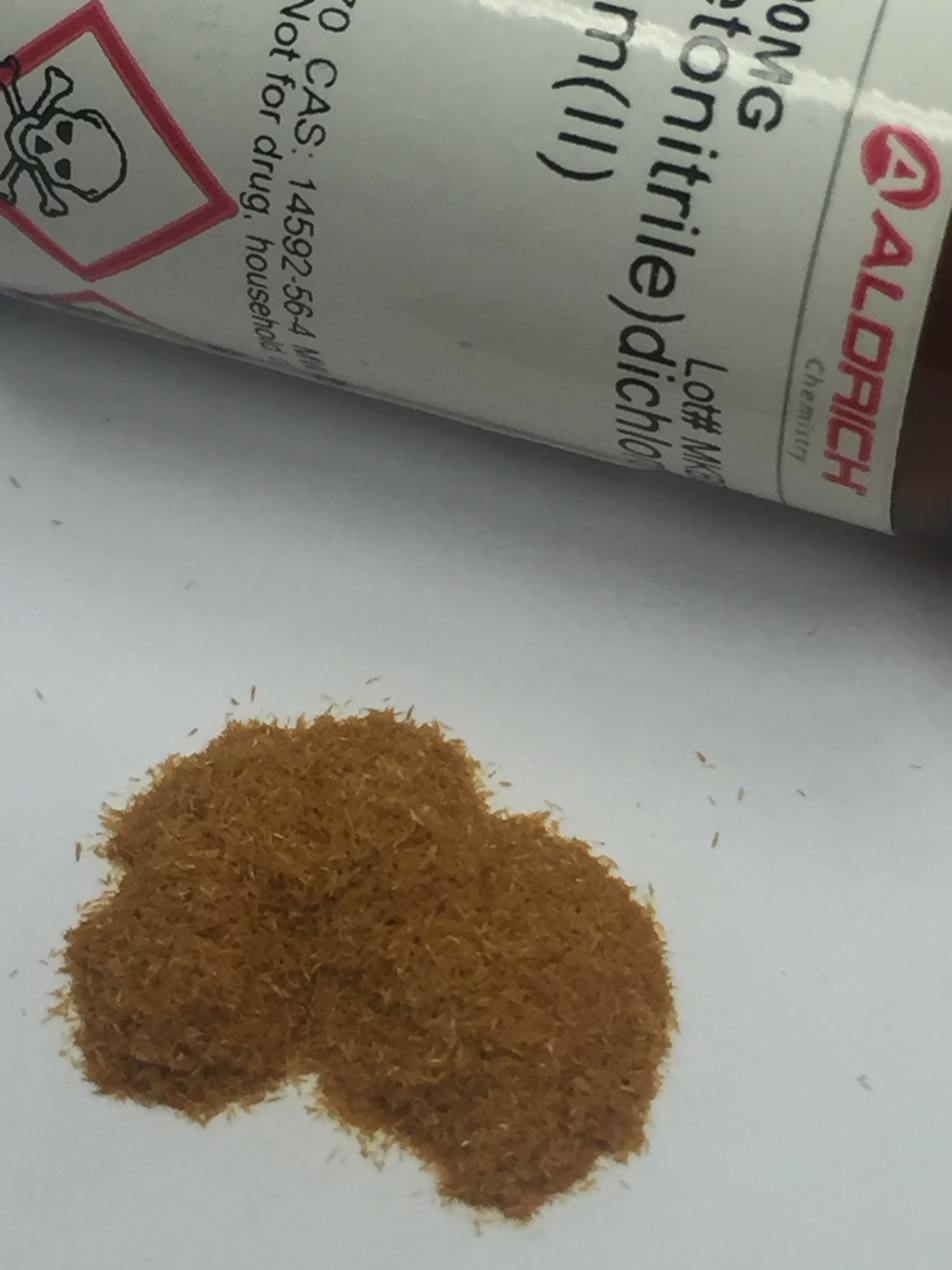

Names
- Other names palladium dichloride sis(benzonitrile), bis(benzonitrile)dichloropalladium

Identifiers
CAS Number	14220-64-5
3D model (JSmol)	ionic form: Interactive image; coordination form: Interactive image
ChemSpider	376043
ECHA InfoCard	100.034.608
EC Number	238-085-3
PubChem CID	498840
- InChI: InChI=1S/2C7H5N.2ClH.Pd/c2*8-6-7-4-2-1-3-5-7;;;/h2*1-5H;2*1H;/q;;;;+2/p-2 Key: WXNOJTUTEXAZLD-UHFFFAOYSA-L
- SMILES: ionic form: C1=CC=C(C=C1)C#N.C1=CC=C(C=C1)C#N.Cl[Pd]Cl; coordination form: Cl[Pd-2](Cl)([N+]#Cc0ccccc0)[N+]#Cc0ccccc0

Properties
Chemical formula	C_{14}H_{10}Cl_{2}N_{2}Pd
Molar mass	383.57 g·mol^{−1}
Appearance	yellow-brown
Melting point	129–130 °C (264–266 °F; 402–403 K)

Hazards
- GHS labelling
Pictograms	(GHS06: Toxic) (GHS07: Exclamation mark)
Signal word	Danger
Hazard statements	H301, H311, H330
Precautionary statements	P260, P264, P270, P271, P273, P280, P284, P301+P310, P301+P312, P302+P352, P304+P312, P304+P340, P305+P351+P338, P310, P311, P312, P320, P321, P330, P332+P313, P337+P313, P361, P362, P363, P403+P233, P405, P501
- Except where otherwise noted, data are given for materials in their standard state (at 25 °C [77 °F], 100 kPa). Infobox references

Bis(benzonitrile)palladium dichloride is the coordination complex with the formula PdCl_{2}(NCC_{6}H_{5})_{2}. It is the adduct of two benzonitrile (PhCN) ligands with palladium(II) chloride. It is a yellow-brown solid that is soluble in organic solvents. The compound is a reagent and a precatalyst for reactions that require soluble Pd(II). A closely related compound is bis(acetonitrile)palladium dichloride.

The complex is prepared by dissolving PdCl_{2} in warm benzonitrile. The PhCN ligands are labile, and the complex reverts to PdCl_{2} in noncoordinating solvents. According to X-ray crystallography, the two PhCN ligands are mutually trans.
