= Palladium fluoride =

Palladium fluoride is the name of a series of binary compounds of palladium and fluorine. These include:

- Palladium(II) fluoride or palladium difluoride, PdF_{2}
- Palladium(II,IV) fluoride or palladium trifluoride, PdF_{3}. It is not palladium(III) fluoride (which is unknown), and is often described as palladium(II) hexafluoropalladate(IV), Pd^{II}[Pd^{IV}F_{6}]
- Palladium(IV) fluoride, or palladium tetrafluoride, PdF_{4}
- Palladium(VI) fluoride, or palladium hexafluoride, PdF_{6}, which is calculated to be stable

Palladium-fluorine coordination complexes have been developed to catalyse the synthesis of aryl fluorides, which are otherwise difficult to make.
