= Platinum(IV) chloride =

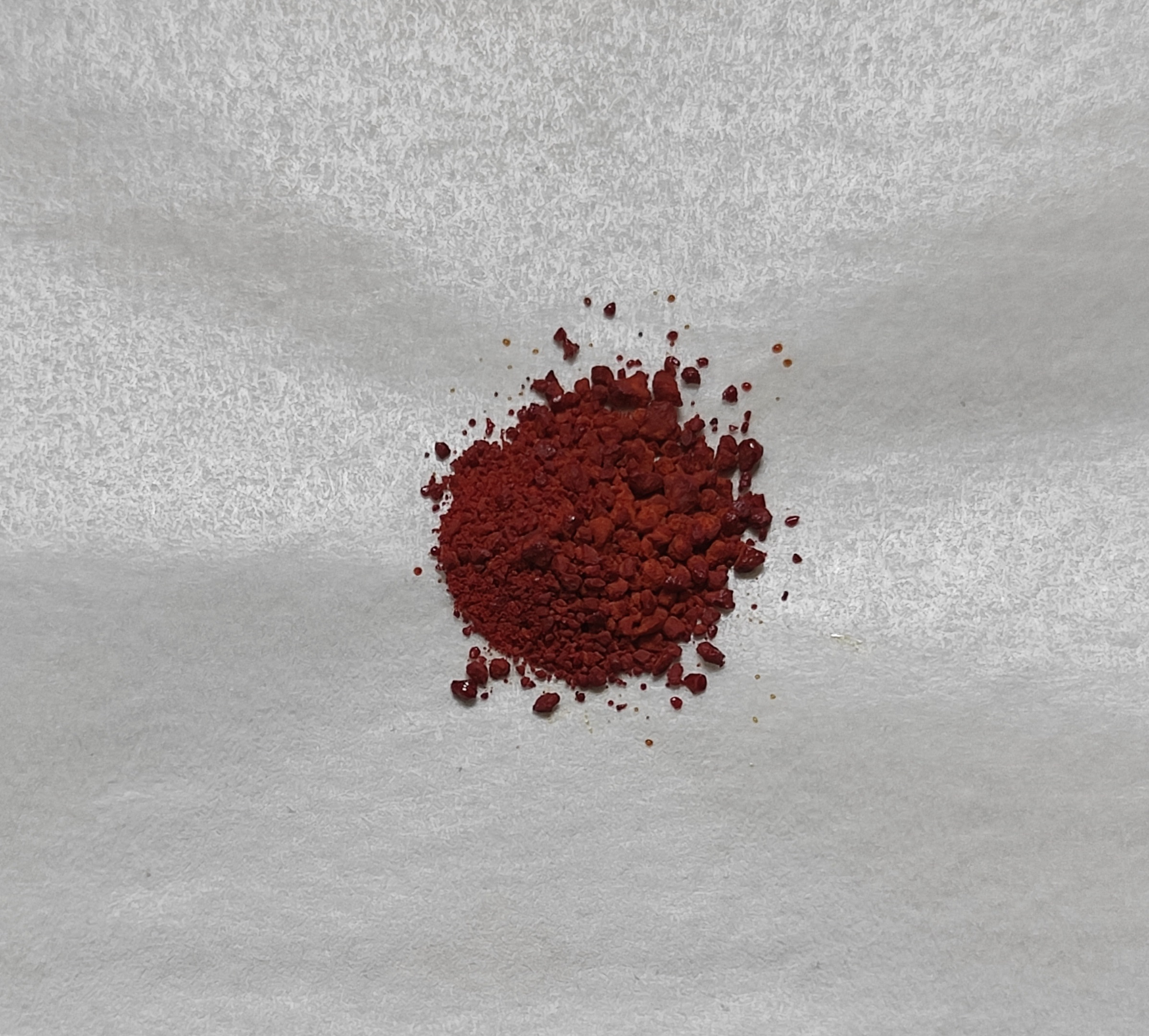

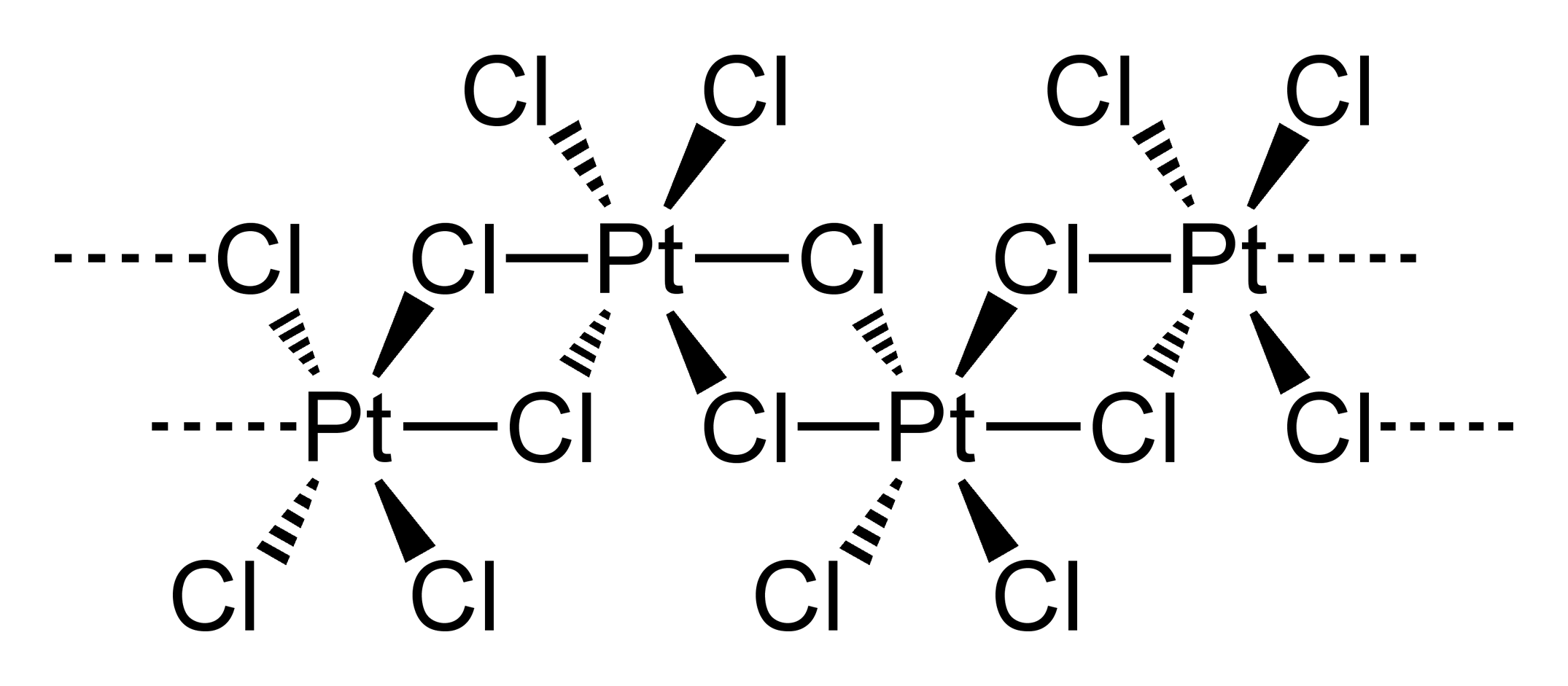
- Platinum(IV) chloride

Names
- IUPAC name Platinum tetrachloride
- Other names Platinum(IV) chloride

Identifiers
CAS Number	13454-96-1
3D model (JSmol)	ionic monomer: Interactive image; coordination monomer: Interactive image; coordination polymer: Interactive image
ChemSpider	19957150
ECHA InfoCard	100.033.300
EC Number	236-645-1
PubChem CID	26031
RTECS number	TP2275500
UNII	W3YUG71TU2
CompTox Dashboard (EPA)	DTXSID601014389 DTXSID00905309, DTXSID601014389
- InChI: InChI=1/4ClH.2Pt/h4*1H;;/q;;;;2*+2/p-4 Key: KBPRWZWTZAMEIF-XBHQNQODAX
- SMILES: ionic monomer: [Pt+4].[Cl-].[Cl-].[Cl-].[Cl-]; coordination monomer: Cl[Pt](Cl)(Cl)Cl; coordination polymer: Cl[Pt-]1(Cl)(Cl)(Cl)[Cl+][Pt-2]2([Cl+]1)(Cl)(Cl)[Cl+][Pt-2]1([Cl+]2)(Cl)(Cl)[Cl+][Pt-2]2([Cl+]1)(Cl)(Cl)[Cl+][Pt-2]1([Cl+]2)(Cl)(Cl)[Cl+][Pt-2]2([Cl+]1)(Cl)(Cl)[Cl+][Pt-2]1([Cl+]2)(Cl)(Cl)[Cl+][Pt-2]2([Cl+]1)(Cl)(Cl)[Cl+][Pt-2]1([Cl+]2)(Cl)(Cl)[Cl+][Pt-]([Cl+]1)(Cl)(Cl)(Cl)Cl

Properties
Chemical formula	PtCl_{4}
Molar mass	336.89 g/mol
Appearance	brown-red powder
Density	4.303 g/cm^{3} (anhydrous); 2.43 g/cm^{3} (pentahydrate)
Melting point	370 °C (698 °F; 643 K) (decomposes)
Solubility in water	58.7 g/100 mL (anhydrous) very soluble (pentahydrate)
Solubility	anhydrous soluble in acetone slightly soluble in ethanol insoluble in ether pentahydrate soluble in alcohol, ether
Magnetic susceptibility (χ)	−93.0·10^{−6} cm^{3}/mol

Structure
Molecular shape	Square planar

Hazards
- GHS labelling
Pictograms	(GHS05: Corrosive) (GHS06: Toxic) (GHS07: Exclamation mark) (GHS08: Health hazard)
Signal word	Danger
Hazard statements	H290, H301, H314, H317, H334
Precautionary statements	P234, P260, P264, P270, P272, P280, P285, P301+P310, P301+P330+P331, P302+P352, P303+P361+P353, P304+P340, P304+P341, P305+P351+P338, P310, P321, P330, P333+P313, P342+P311, P363, P390, P404, P405, P501
- Lethal dose or concentration (LD, LC)
LD_{50} (median dose)	276 mg/kg (rat, oral)

Related compounds
Other anions	Platinum(IV) bromide Platinum(IV) fluoride Platinum(IV) sulfide
Other cations	Iridium(IV) chloride
Related compounds	Platinum(II) chloride Platinum(VI) fluoride
- Except where otherwise noted, data are given for materials in their standard state (at 25 °C [77 °F], 100 kPa). Infobox references

Platinum(IV) chloride is the inorganic compound of platinum and chlorine with the empirical formula PtCl_{4}. This brown solid features platinum in the +4 oxidation state.

== Structure ==
Typical of Pt(IV), the metal centers adopt an octahedral coordination geometry, {PtCl_{6}}. This geometry is achieved by forming a polymer wherein half of the chloride ligands bridge between the platinum centers. Because of its polymeric structure, PtCl_{4} dissolves only upon breaking the chloride bridging ligands. Thus, addition of HCl give H_{2}PtCl_{6}. Lewis base adducts of Pt(IV) of the type cis-PtCl_{4}L_{2} are known, but most are prepared by oxidation of the Pt(II) derivatives.

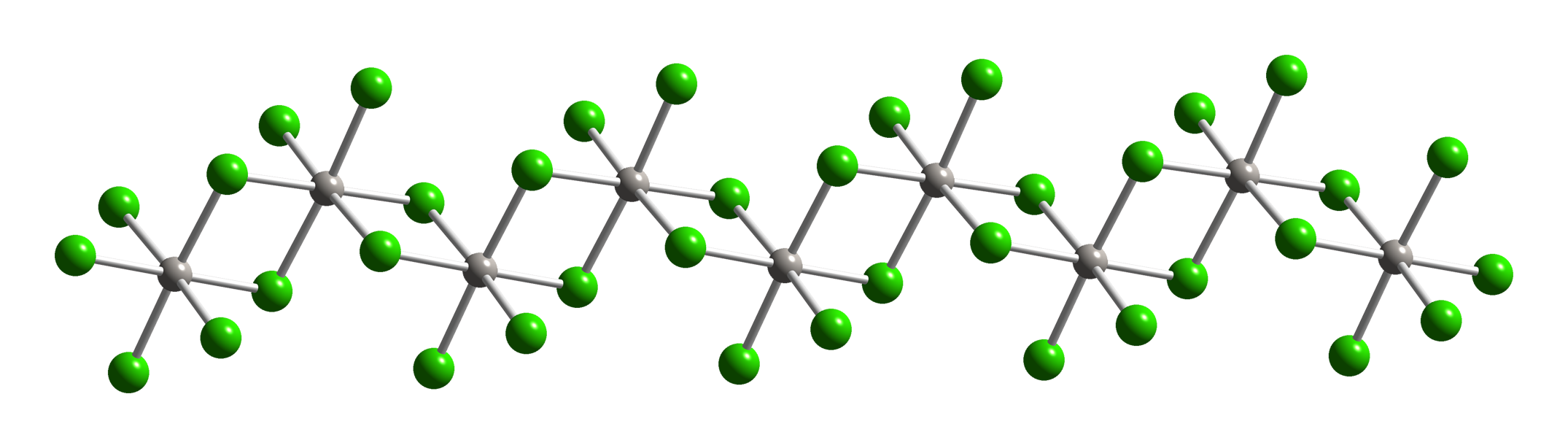
Part of a (PtCl_{4})_{∞} chain from the crystal structure of platinum(IV) chloride

== Formation and reactions ==
PtCl_{4} is mainly encountered in the handling of chloroplatinic acid, obtained by dissolving of Pt metal in aqua regia. Heating H_{2}PtCl_{6} to 220 °C gives impure PtCl_{4}:

H_{2}PtCl_{6} → PtCl_{4} + 2 HCl

A purer product can be produced by heating under chlorine gas at 250 °C.

If excess acids are removed, PtCl_{4} crystallizes from aqueous solutions in large red crystals of pentahydrate PtCl_{4}·5(H_{2}O), which can be dehydrated by heating to about 300 °C in a current of dry chlorine. The pentahydrate is stable and is used as the commercial form of PtCl_{4}.

Treatment of PtCl_{4} with aqueous base gives the [Pt(OH)_{6}]^{2−} ion. With methyl Grignard reagents followed by partial hydrolysis, PtCl_{4} converts to the cuboidal cluster [Pt(CH_{3})_{3}(OH)]_{4}. Upon heating PtCl_{4} evolves chlorine to give PtCl_{2}:

PtCl_{4} → PtCl_{2} + Cl_{2}

The heavier halides, PtBr_{4} and PtI_{4}, are also known.
