= Platinum(II) fluoride =

Names
- Other names: Platinum difluoride; Difluoroplatinum

Identifiers
CAS Number	18820-56-9
3D model (JSmol)	Interactive image
ChemSpider	123853
PubChem CID	140429
CompTox Dashboard (EPA)	DTXSID90172169
- InChI: InChI=1S/2FH.Pt/h2*1H;/q;;+2/p-2 Key: FXGFZZYDXMUETH-UHFFFAOYSA-L
- SMILES: F[Pt]F

Properties
Chemical formula	F_{2}Pt
Molar mass	233.081 g·mol^{−1}
Appearance	yellow crystals
Solubility in water	insoluble

Related compounds
Related compounds	Palladium difluoride
- Except where otherwise noted, data are given for materials in their standard state (at 25 °C [77 °F], 100 kPa). Infobox references

Platinum(II) fluoride is a binary inorganic compound of platinum and fluorine with the chemical formula PtF_{2}. Some sources claim that its existence is uncertain.

== Synthesis ==
Platinum(II) fluoride can be prepared by direct fluorination of platinum at 500-600 °C:

Pt + F_{2} → PtF_{2}

== Chemical properties ==
Platinum difluoride decomposes under strong heating:

PtF_{2} → Pt + F_{2}
