= Palladium(II) fluoride =

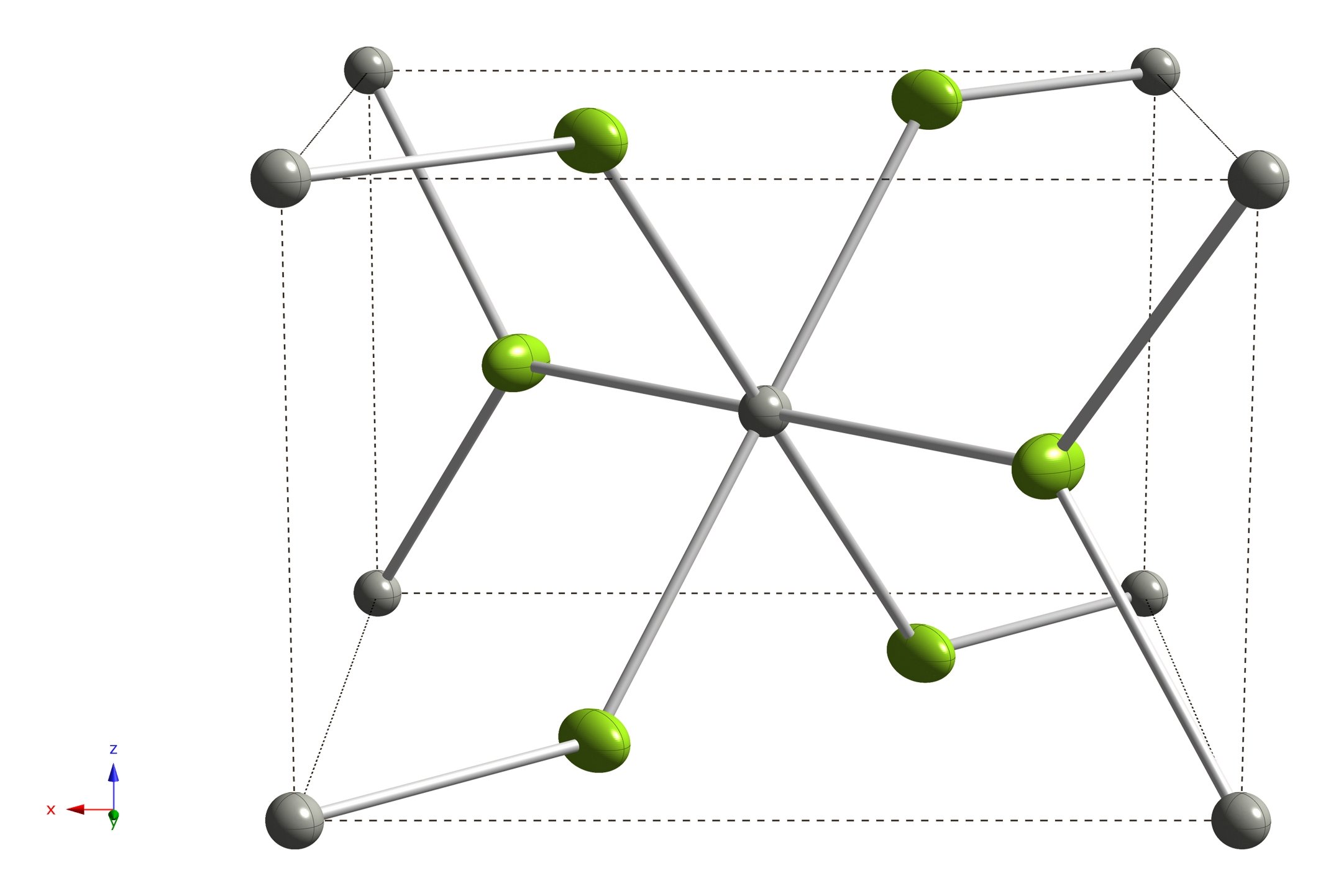
- unit cell of the crystal structure of palladium(II) fluoride

Identifiers
CAS Number	13444-96-7
3D model (JSmol)	Interactive image
ChemSpider	75308
ECHA InfoCard	100.033.249
EC Number	236-589-8
PubChem CID	83470
CompTox Dashboard (EPA)	DTXSID3065459
- InChI: InChI=1S/2FH.Pd/h2*1H;/q;;+2/p-2 Key: BHZSLLSDZFAPFH-UHFFFAOYSA-L; InChI=1/2FH.Pd/h2*1H;/q;;+2/p-2 Key: BHZSLLSDZFAPFH-NUQVWONBAA
- SMILES: F[Pd]F

Properties
Chemical formula	F_{2}Pd
Molar mass	144.42 g·mol^{−1}
Appearance	pale violet crystalline solid; hygroscopic
Density	5.76 g cm^{−3}
Melting point	952 °C (1,746 °F; 1,225 K)
Solubility in water	reacts with water

Structure
Crystal structure	tetragonal
Coordination geometry	octahedral

Related compounds
Other anions	Palladium(II) chloride Palladium(II) bromide Palladium(II) iodide
Other cations	Nickel(II) fluoride Platinum(II) fluoride Platinum(IV) fluoride
- Except where otherwise noted, data are given for materials in their standard state (at 25 °C [77 °F], 100 kPa). verify (what is ?) Infobox references

Palladium(II) fluoride, also known as palladium difluoride, is the chemical compound of palladium and fluorine with the formula PdF_{2}.

== Structure and paramagnetism ==
Like its lighter congener nickel(II) fluoride, PdF_{2} adopts a rutile-type crystal structure, containing octahedrally coordinated palladium, which has the electronic configuration t^{6}_{2g} e^{2}_{g}. This configuration causes PdF_{2} to be paramagnetic due to two unpaired electrons, one in each e_{g}-symmetry orbital of palladium.

== Synthesis ==
PdF_{2} is prepared by refluxing palladium(II,IV) fluoride, Pd^{II}[Pd^{IV}F_{6}], with selenium tetrafluoride, SeF_{4}.

Pd[PdF_{6}] + SeF_{4} → 2PdF_{2} + SeF_{6}

== Applications ==
Palladium fluoride is an insoluble powder used in infrared optical sensors, and in situations where reactivity to oxygen makes palladium oxide unsuitable.

== See also ==
- Palladium fluoride
