= Ammonium benzoate =

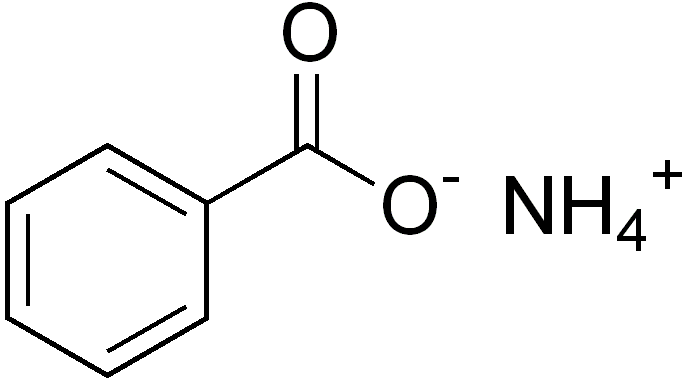

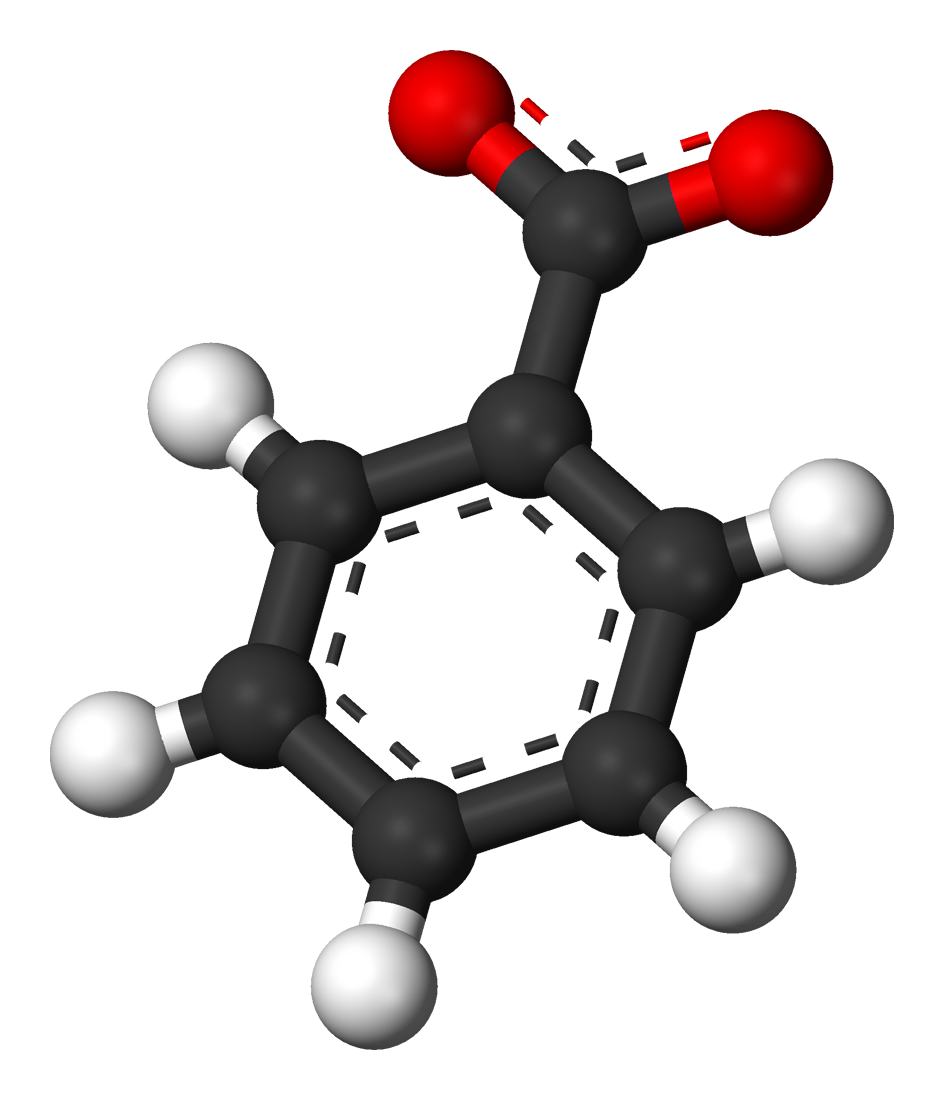
Ball-and-stick model of the benzoate anion
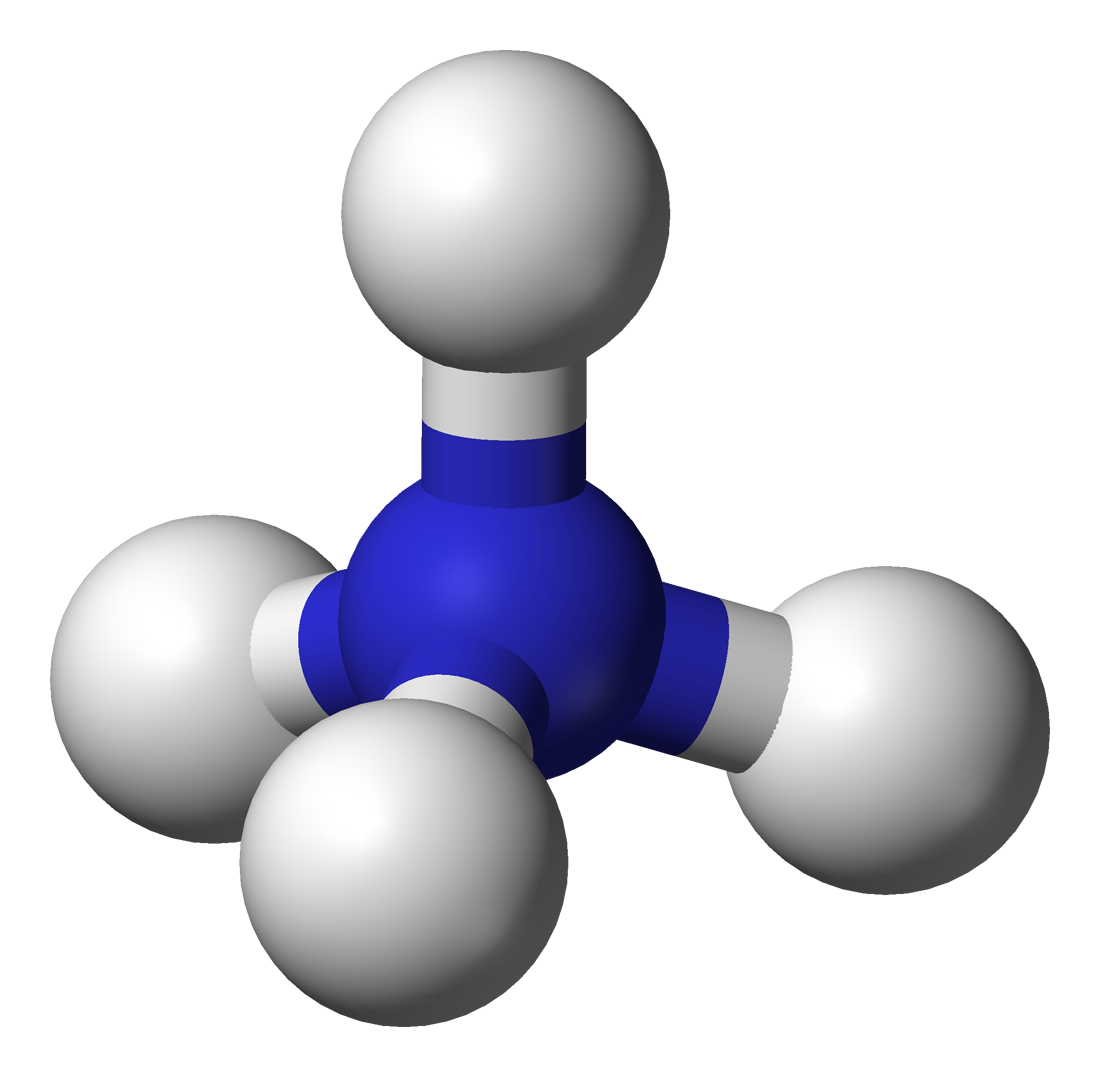
Ball-and-stick model of the ammonium cation

Identifiers
CAS Number	1863-63-4
3D model (JSmol)	Interactive image
ChemSpider	15050
ECHA InfoCard	100.015.881
EC Number	217-468-9
PubChem CID	15830
RTECS number	DG337800
UNII	AC80WD7GPF
CompTox Dashboard (EPA)	DTXSID4041602
- InChI: InChI=1S/C7H6O2.H3N/c8-7(9)6-4-2-1-3-5-6;/h1-5H,(H,8,9);1H3 Key: VWSRWGFGAAKTQG-UHFFFAOYSA-N; InChI=1/C7H6O2.H3N/c8-7(9)6-4-2-1-3-5-6;/h1-5H,(H,8,9);1H3 Key: VWSRWGFGAAKTQG-UHFFFAOYAJ
- SMILES: [O-]C(=O)c1ccccc1.[NH4+]

Properties
Chemical formula	C_{7}H_{9}NO_{2}
Molar mass	139.15 g/mol
Appearance	White solid
Density	1.26 g/cm^{3}
Melting point	198 °C (388 °F; 471 K)
Solubility in water	21.3 g/100 mL (20 °C); 83 g/100 mL (100 °C)
Solubility	soluble in methanol insoluble in diethyl ether

Hazards
- GHS labelling
Pictograms	(GHS07: Exclamation mark)
Signal word	Warning
Hazard statements	H302, H315, H319, H335
Precautionary statements	P261, P264, P270, P271, P280, P301+P312, P302+P352, P304+P340, P305+P351+P338, P312, P321, P330, P332+P313, P337+P313, P362, P403+P233, P405, P501
NFPA 704 (fire diamond)	2 1 2
- Lethal dose or concentration (LD, LC)
LD_{50} (median dose)	825 mg/kg, oral (rat)
Safety data sheet (SDS)	Fisher Scientific
- Except where otherwise noted, data are given for materials in their standard state (at 25 °C [77 °F], 100 kPa). verify (what is ?) Infobox references

Ammonium benzoate, a white powder-like substance, is the ammonium salt of benzoic acid. This compound is prepared by the reaction of benzoic acid and ammonia.

== Uses ==
Ammonium benzoate is used as a food preservative, due to its antibacterial and antifungal properties.

== Reactions ==
Ammonium benzoate can be dehydrated to form benzamide:

C_{7}H_{9}NO_{2} → C_{7}H_{7}NO + H_{2}O
