= Palladium(II) bromide =

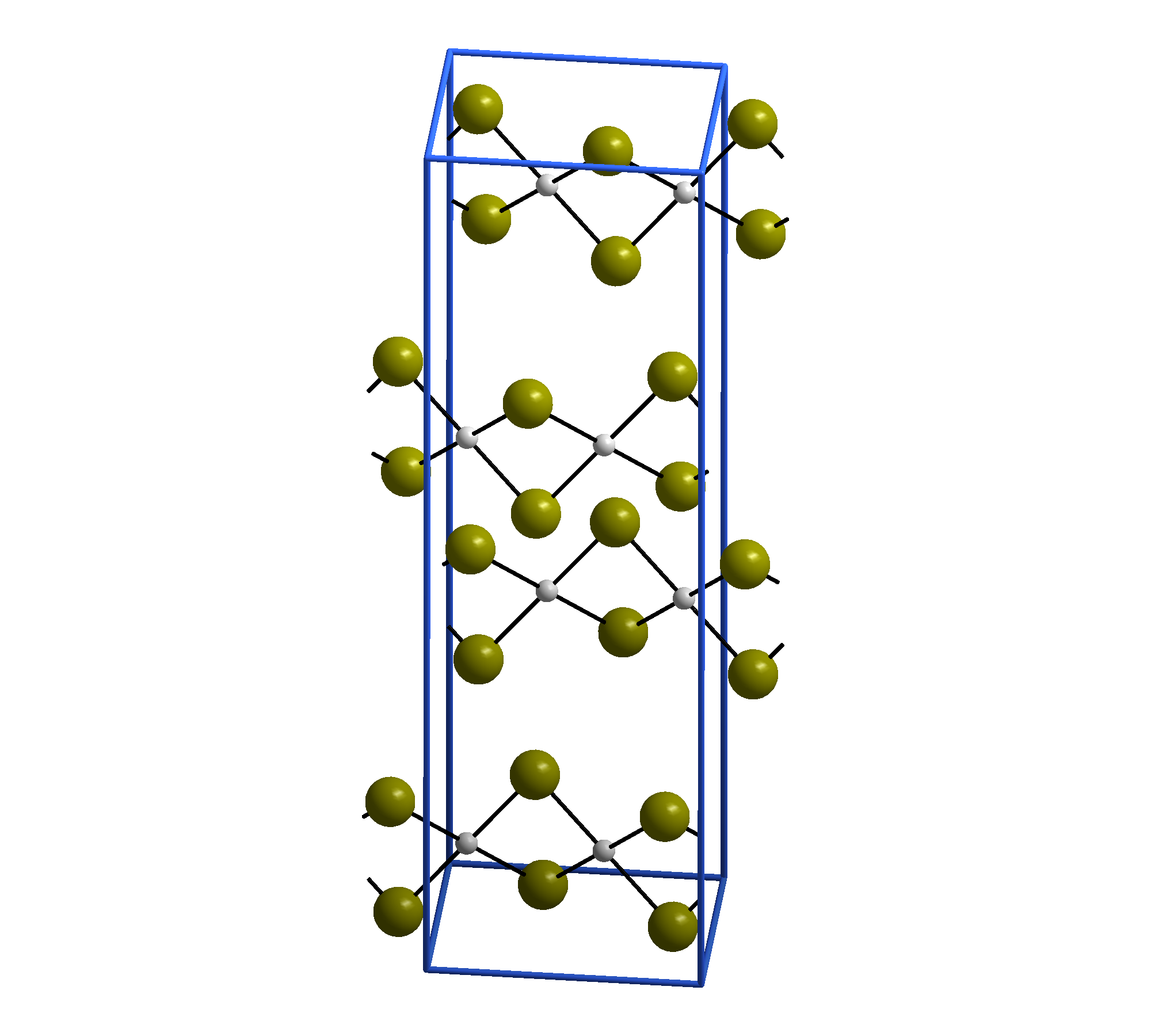

Identifiers
CAS Number	13444-94-5
3D model (JSmol)	Interactive image
ChemSpider	75307
ECHA InfoCard	100.033.248
EC Number	236-588-2
PubChem CID	83469
CompTox Dashboard (EPA)	DTXSID8065458
- InChI: InChI=1S/2BrH.Pd/h2*1H;/q;;+2/p-2 Key: INIOZDBICVTGEO-UHFFFAOYSA-L
- SMILES: Br[Pd]Br

Properties
Chemical formula	Br_{2}Pd
Molar mass	266.228 g/mol

Hazards
- GHS labelling
Pictograms	(GHS07: Exclamation mark)
Signal word	Warning
Hazard statements	H315, H319, H335
Precautionary statements	P261, P264, P264+P265, P271, P280, P302+P352, P304+P340, P305+P351+P338, P319, P321, P332+P317, P337+P317, P362+P364, P403+P233, P405, P501

Related compounds
Other anions	Palladium(II) fluoride Palladium(II) chloride Palladium(II) iodide
- Except where otherwise noted, data are given for materials in their standard state (at 25 °C [77 °F], 100 kPa). verify (what is ?) Infobox references

Palladium(II) bromide is an inorganic compound of palladium and bromine with the chemical formula PdBr_{2}. It is a commercially available, although less common than palladium(II) chloride, the usual entry point to palladium complexes. It is a diamagnetic solid.

== Structure ==
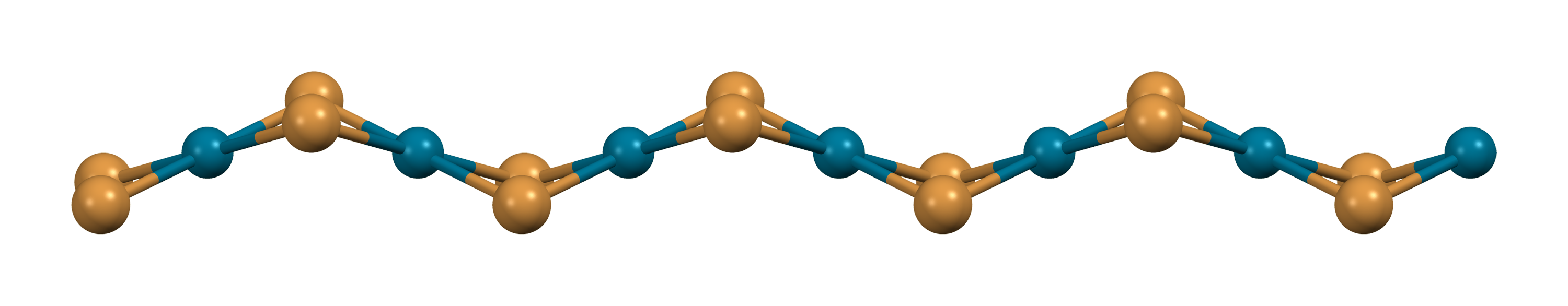

As confirmed by X-ray crystallography, PdBr_{2} is a coordination polymer. It crystallises in the P2_{1}/c space group and the structure consists of wavy ribbons of edge-sharing PdBr_{4} coordination squares.

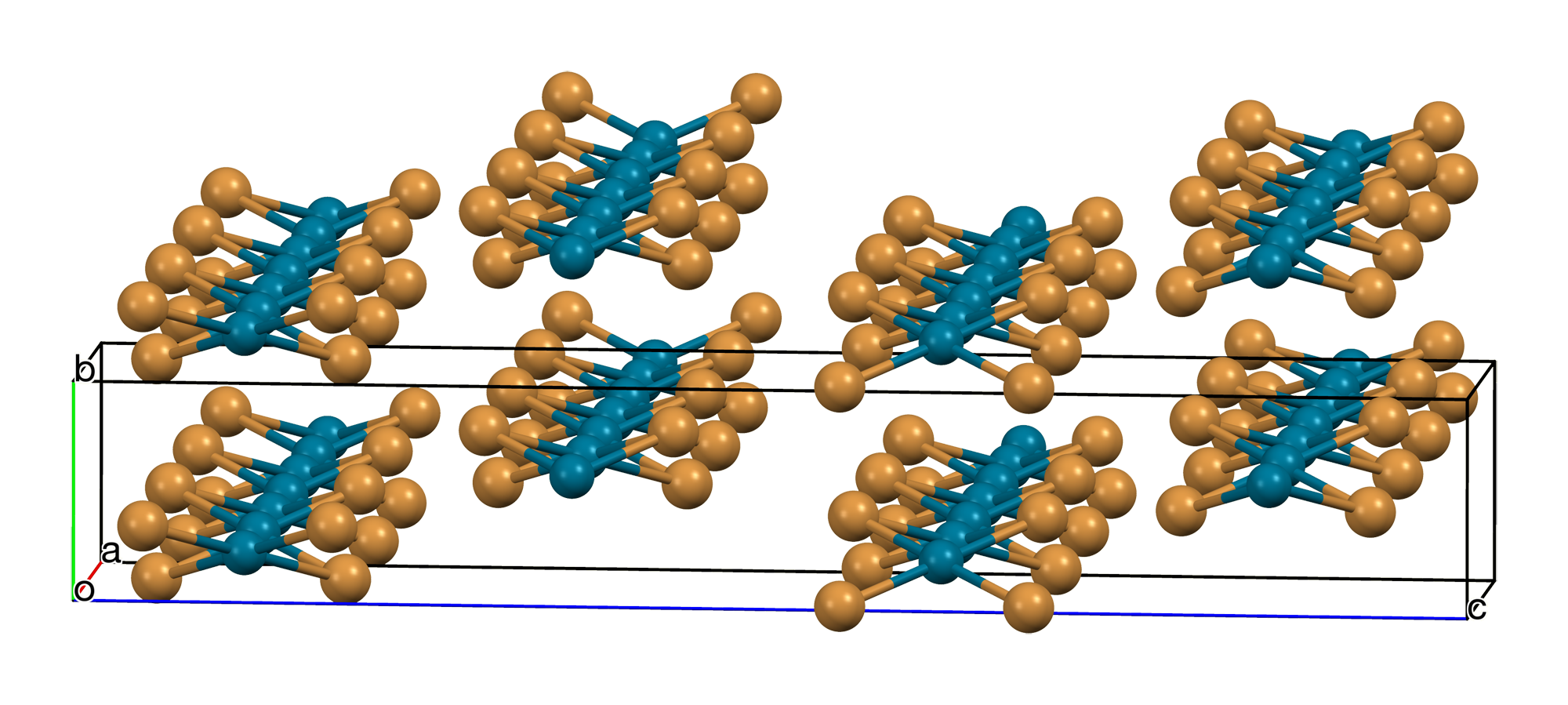
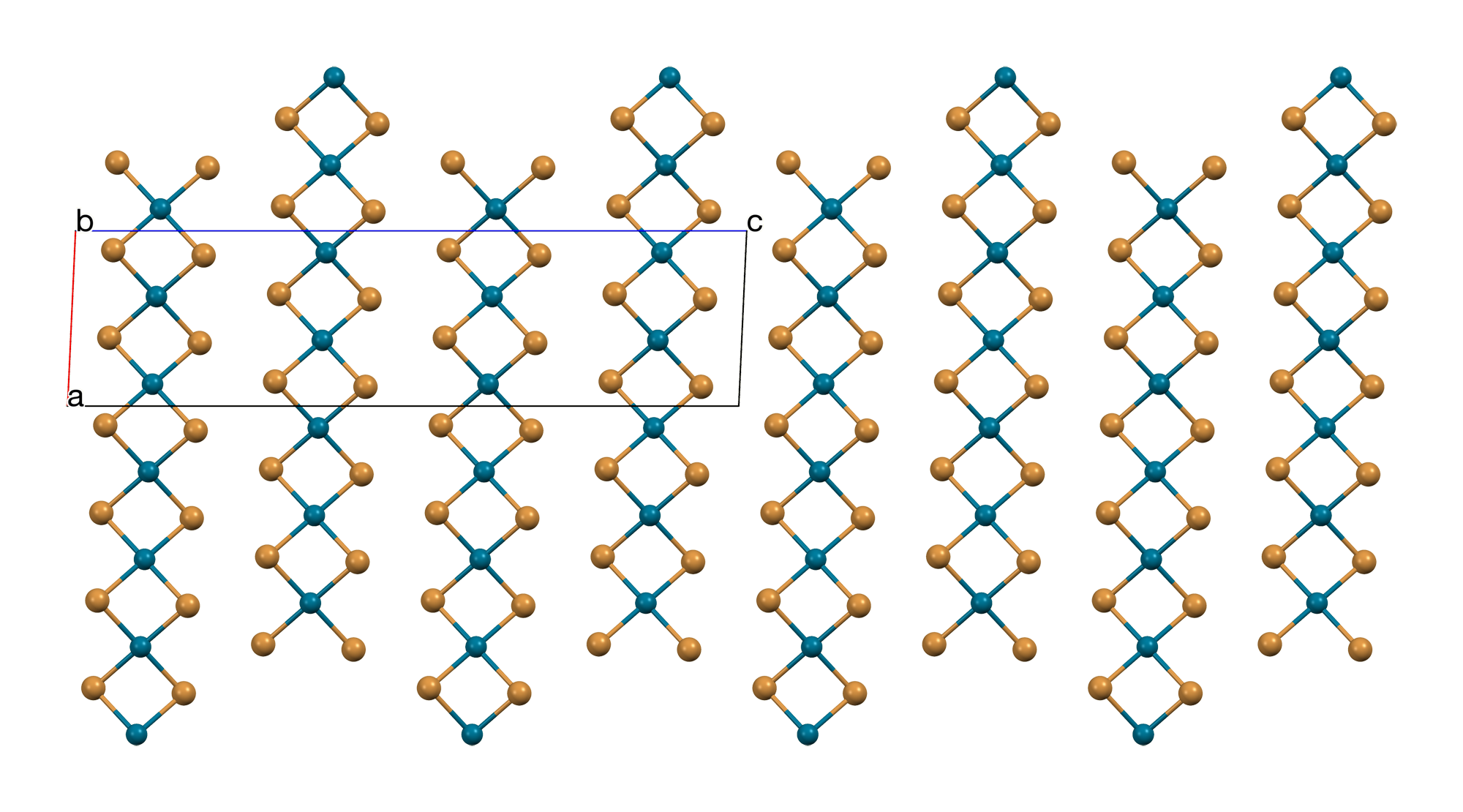

== Reactions ==
Palladium(II) bromide is insoluble in water but dissolves when heated in acetonitrile to give monomeric acetonitrile adducts:

PdBr_{2} + 2 MeCN → PdBr_{2}(MeCN)_{2}

PdBr_{2} exhibits many of the properties of palladium chloride and palladium acetate, giving catalysts active for carbonylations and cross-coupling reactions.
