= Tribenzylamine =

Identifiers
CAS Number	620-40-6
3D model (JSmol)	Interactive image
ChEMBL	ChEMBL3184803
ChemSpider	22739
ECHA InfoCard	100.009.673
EC Number	210-638-3
PubChem CID	24321
UNII	HZ10O1931J
CompTox Dashboard (EPA)	DTXSID5047031
- InChI: InChI=1S/C21H21N/c1-4-10-19(11-5-1)16-22(17-20-12-6-2-7-13-20)18-21-14-8-3-9-15-21/h1-15H,16-18H2 Key: MXHTZQSKTCCMFG-UHFFFAOYSA-N
- SMILES: C1=CC=C(C=C1)CN(CC2=CC=CC=C2)CC3=CC=CC=C3

Properties
Chemical formula	C_{21}H_{21}N
Molar mass	287.406 g·mol^{−1}
Appearance	white solid
Melting point	91.5 °C (196.7 °F; 364.6 K)
Boiling point	385 °C (725 °F; 658 K)

Hazards
- GHS labelling
Pictograms	(GHS07: Exclamation mark)
Signal word	Warning
Hazard statements	H315, H319, H335
Precautionary statements	P261, P264, P264+P265, P271, P280, P302+P352, P304+P340, P305+P351+P338, P319, P321, P332+P317, P337+P317, P362+P364, P403+P233, P405, P501
- Except where otherwise noted, data are given for materials in their standard state (at 25 °C [77 °F], 100 kPa). Infobox references

Tribenzylamine is an organic compound with the formula N(CH_{2}C_{6}H_{5})_{3}. It is a symmetrical tertiary amine. It is of some historic interest as one of the first compounds produced by the Leuckart reaction.

The compound is a common target in the development of new synthetic methods, e.g. from benzyl alcohol.
