= Palladium compounds =

Chemical compounds with at least one palladium atom

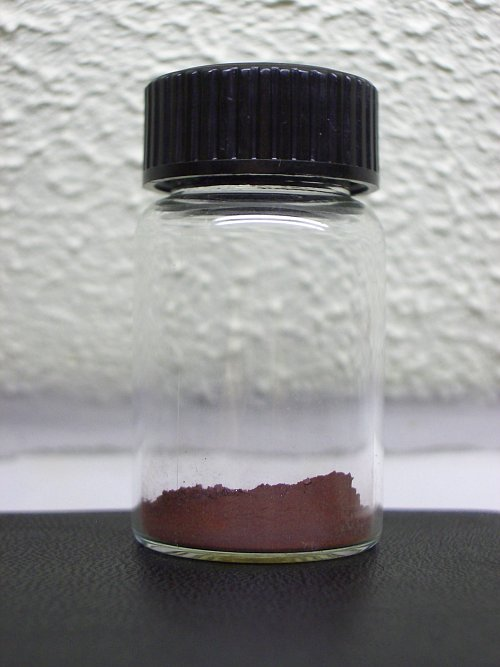
A sample of palladium(II) chloride, a compound of palladium

Palladium forms a variety of ionic, coordination, and organopalladium compounds, typically with oxidation state Pd^{0} or Pd^{2+}. Palladium(III) compounds have also been reported. Palladium compounds are frequently used as catalysts in cross-coupling reactions such as the Sonogashira coupling and Suzuki reaction.

== Ionic compounds ==
Most ionic compounds of palladium involve the Pd^{2+} oxidation state. Palladium(II) chloride is a starting point in the synthesis of other palladium compounds and complexes. Palladium(II) acetate plus triphenylphosphine is used as a catalyst in organic synthesis.

== Coordination compounds ==
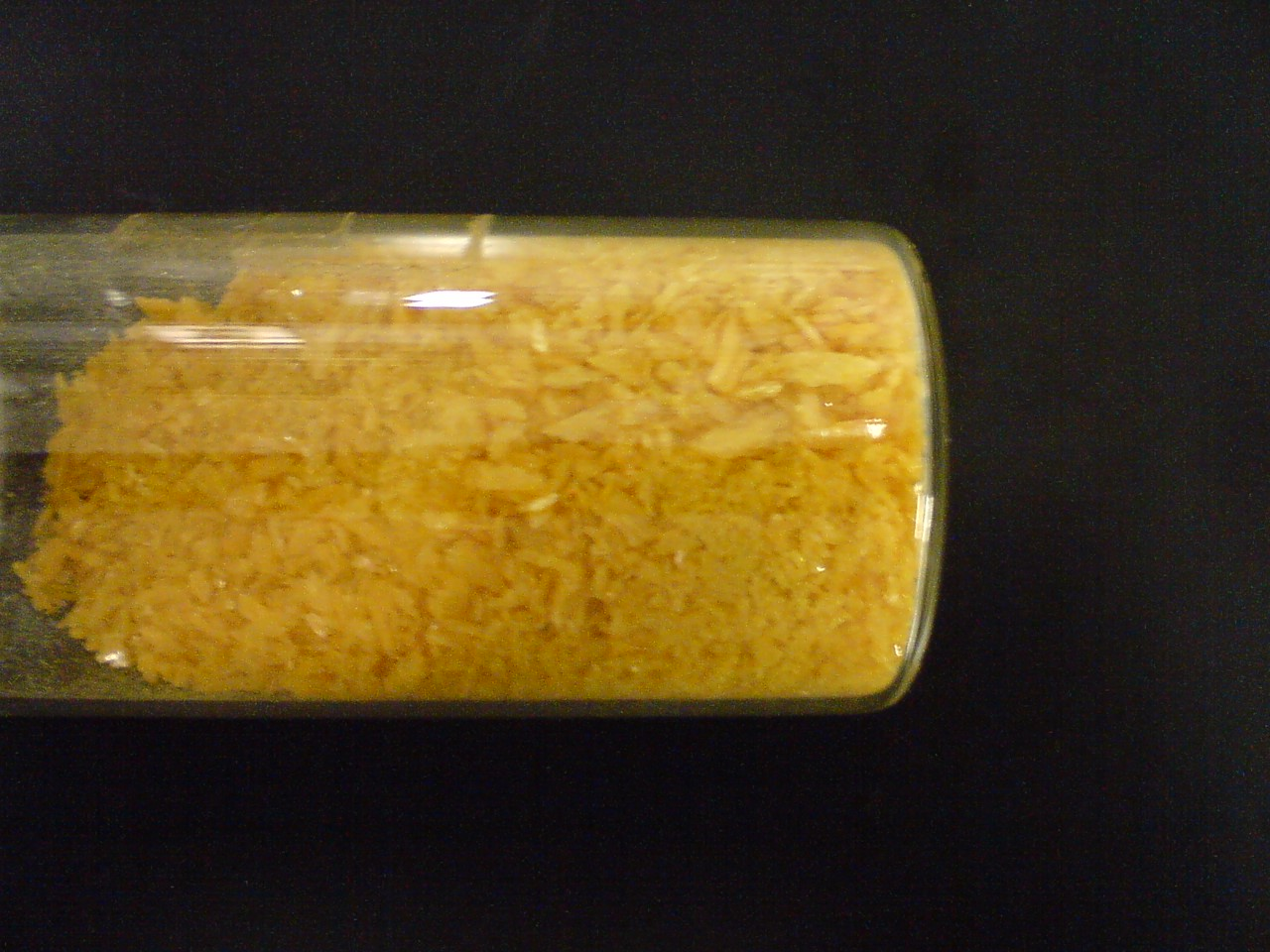
Bis(triphenylphosphine)palladium chloride, PdCl_{2}(PPh_{3})_{2}

Coordination compounds of palladium contain ligands coordinated to a central Pd^{0} or Pd^{2+} center. They are typically synthesized by adding ligands to an ionic palladium compound. For example, acetonitrile, benzonitrile, or triphenylphosphine may be coordinated to palladium(II) chloride (PdCl_{2}) to form bis(acetonitrile)palladium dichloride (PdCl_{2}(NCC_{6}H_{5})_{2}), bis(benzonitrile)palladium dichloride (PdCl_{2}(PPh_{3})_{2}), or bis(triphenylphosphine)palladium chloride (PdCl_{2}(PPh_{3})_{2}), respectively. Many other more exotic ligands form a large variety of palladium-phosphine catalysts, such as 1,1'-bis(diphenylphosphino)ferrocene (dppf) to form [1,1'-bis(diphenylphosphino)ferrocene]palladium(II) dichloride (PdCl_{2}(dppf)).

Another precursor to coordination compounds of palladium is sodium tetrachloropalladate, to which dibenzylideneacetone (dba) and acetylacetonate may be coordinated to form tris(dibenzylideneacetone)dipalladium(0) (Pd_{2}(dba)_{3}) and palladium(II) bis(acetylacetonate), respectively.

Bis(triphenylphosphine)palladium chloride, which contains palladium as Pd^{2+}, may be reduced using hydrazine in the presence of triphenylphosphine to form tetrakis(triphenylphosphine)palladium(0) (Pd(PPh_{3})_{4}), which contains Pd^{0}.

== Catalysis ==
$\begin{array}{c} \\ {\color{Red}\ce{R^1}}\ce{-X} + {\color{Blue}\ce{R^2-BY2}} \ \ce{->[\text{[Pd] cat., base}]}\ {\color{Red}\ce{R^1}}\ce{-}{\color{Blue}\ce{R^2}} \\ \end{array}$
General scheme of Suzuki reaction

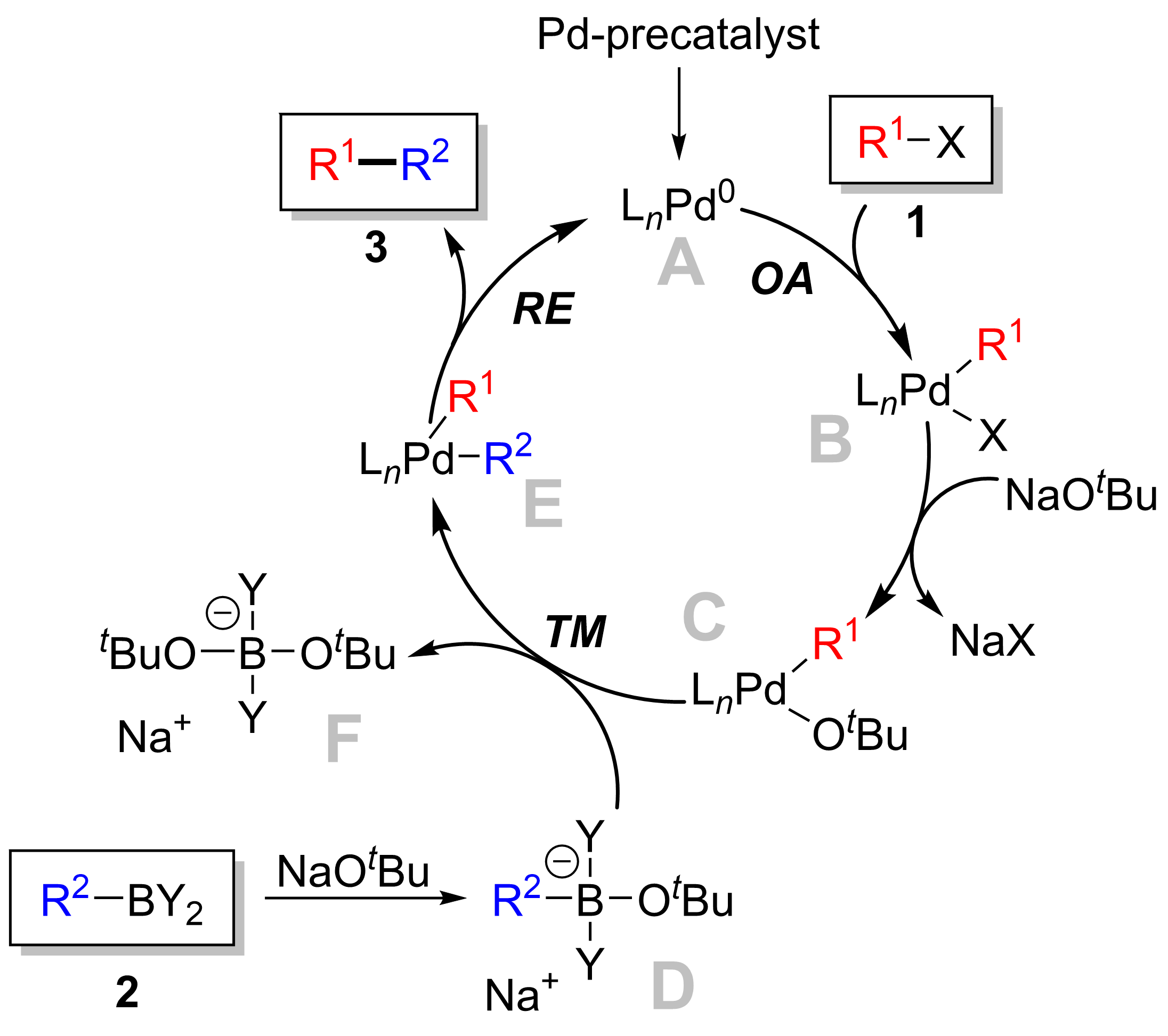
Mechanism of the Suzuki reaction

Both ionic and coordination palladium compounds are frequently used to catalyze cross-coupling reactions. The catalytic ability is due to palladium's ability to switch between the Pd^{0} and Pd^{2+} oxidation states. An organic compound adds across Pd^{0} to form an organic Pd^{2+} complex (oxidative addition). After transmetalation with an organometallic compound, two organic ligands to Pd^{2+} may exit the palladium complex and combine, forming a coupling product and regenerating Pd^{0} (reductive elimination).

For the Suzuki reaction, commonly used catalysts include Pd(PPh_{3})_{4}, PdCl_{2}(PPh_{3})_{2}, PdCl_{2}(dppf), as well as Pd(OAc)_{2} plus triphenylphosphine (PPh_{3}). A large variety of phosphine-based ligands may be used in palladium-phosphine catalysts. Bulky, electron-rich ligands such as tris(2,4,6-trimethoxyphenyl)phosphine result in catalysts that are more reactive in the oxidative addition step and can catalyze the coupling of aryl chlorides, which are typically unreactive.

== See also ==
- Category:Palladium compounds
- Nickel compounds
- Platinum compounds
