= C4H6O3 =

The molecular formula C_{4}H_{6}O_{3} may refer to:

- Acetic anhydride
- Acetoacetic acid
- Dioxanones
  - p-Dioxanone
  - Trimethylene carbonate
- trans-4-Hydroxycrotonic acid
- α-Ketobutyric acid
- 2-Methyl-3-oxopropanoic acid
- Methyl pyruvate
- Propylene carbonate
- Succinic semialdehyde
