= C4H6O5 =

The molecular formula C_{4}H_{6}O_{5} (molar mass: 134.09 g/mol, exact mass: 134.0215 u) may refer to:

- Diglycolic acid
- Dimethyl dicarbonate (DMDC)
- Malic acid
