= Baylis–Hillman reaction =

Chemical reaction

(Morita–)Baylis–Hillman reaction
Named after	Ken-ichi Morita; Anthony B. Baylis; Melville E. D. Hillman
Reaction type	Coupling reaction

Identifiers
Organic Chemistry Portal	baylis-hillman-reaction
RSC ontology ID	RXNO:0000076

In organic chemistry, the Baylis–Hillman, Morita–Baylis–Hillman, or MBH reaction is a carbon–carbon bond-forming reaction between an activated alkene and a carbon electrophile in the presence of a nucleophilic catalyst, such as a tertiary amine or phosphine. The product is densely functionalized, joining the alkene at the α-position to a reduced form of the electrophile (e.g. in the case of an aldehyde, an allylic alcohol).

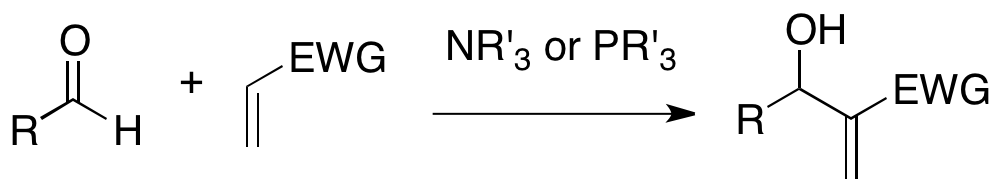
Baylis-Hillman reaction

The reaction is named for Anthony B. Baylis and Melville E. D. Hillman, two of the chemists who developed the reaction at Celanese; and K. Morita, who published earlier work on the same.

The MBH reaction offers several advantages in organic synthesis:

1. It combines easily prepared starting materials with high atom economy.
2. It requires only mild conditions and does not require any transition metals.
3. Asymmetric synthesis is possible from prochiral electrophiles.
4. The product's dense functionalization enables many further transformations.

Its disadvantage is that the reaction is extremely slow.

== Common reagents ==
The most frequently-used catalyst for the reaction is the tertiary amine DABCO (triethylenediamine); other known catalysts include 4-dimethylaminopyridine, DBU (diazabicycloundecene), and various phosphines.

== Reaction mechanism ==
As of 2012, certain questions about MBH reaction's mechanism remain open.

Hill and Isaacs performed the first kinetic experiments in the 1990s, discovering that the reaction rate between acrylonitrile and acetaldehyde was first-order in each reactant and in the DABCO catalyst. α-Deuterated acrylonitrile exhibited no kinetic isotope effect, but the product appeared to catalyze its own generation.

In a model Hoffmann proposed seven years prior, the reaction begins with 1,4-addition of the catalytic amine to the activated alkene. The resulting zwitterionic aza-enolate undergoes aldol addition to the aldehyde. Intramolecular proton shift then generates the final MBH adduct, which eliminates the catalyst.

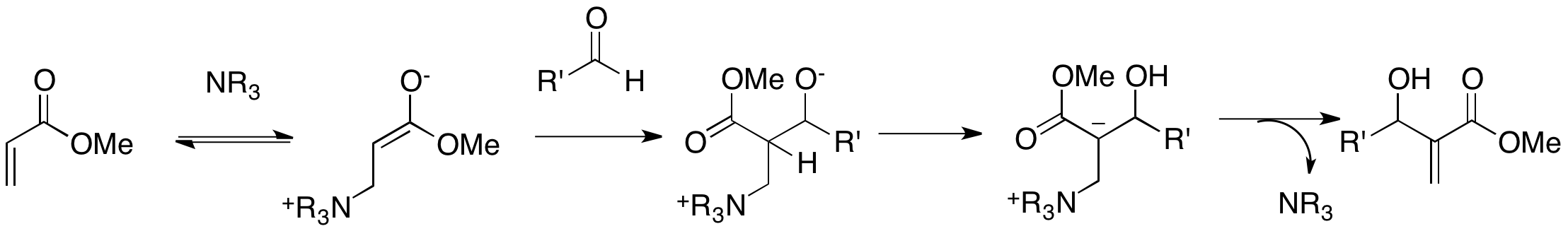

If Hoffmann's model were correct, then the aldol addition would be the rate-limiting step, which accords with the absent kinetic isotope effect. However, Hoffman's mechanism rationalizes neither the product's autocatalysis nor (in the reaction of aryl aldehydes with acrylates) the considerable generation of a dioxanone byproduct.

In more recent work, McQuade et al and Aggarwal et al reevaluated the MBH mechanism, focusing on the proton-transfer and autocatalysis. According to McQuade, the reaction between methyl acrylate and p-nitrobenzaldehyde is second-order relative to the aldehyde. Moreover, it showed a significant kinetic isotope effect for the acrylate's α-hydrogen (5.2 in DMSO, but ≥2 in all solvents), which would imply that proton abstraction is the rate-determining step.

To account for this reanalysis, McQuade proposed modifying Hoffman's proposal, such that after the first aldol addition, a second aldol adds to form a hemiacetal alkoxide. Then the rate-determining proton transfer releases the adduct A via a six-membered transition state, which further reacts to produce the MBH product B or a dioxanone byproduct C.

In a further modification, Aggarwal noted that observed that methanol inhibited autocatalysis in the MBH reaction. Thus he proposed that in the reaction's early stages, a mechanism equivalent to McQuade's proposal operates, but after 20% conversion, reaction with an alcoholic solvent can replace the second aldol addition. In support of this contention, Aggarwal and Harvey modeled the two pathways using density functional theory calculations and showed that the computed energy profile matches the experimental kinetic isotope effects and observed rate of reaction. Also they showed that the overall enthalpic barrier of the alcohol-catalyzed pathway is slightly smaller than that of the non-alcohol-catalyzed pathway, rationalizing that as the alcohol (MBH product) concentration increases the alcohol-catalyzed pathway starts to dominate.

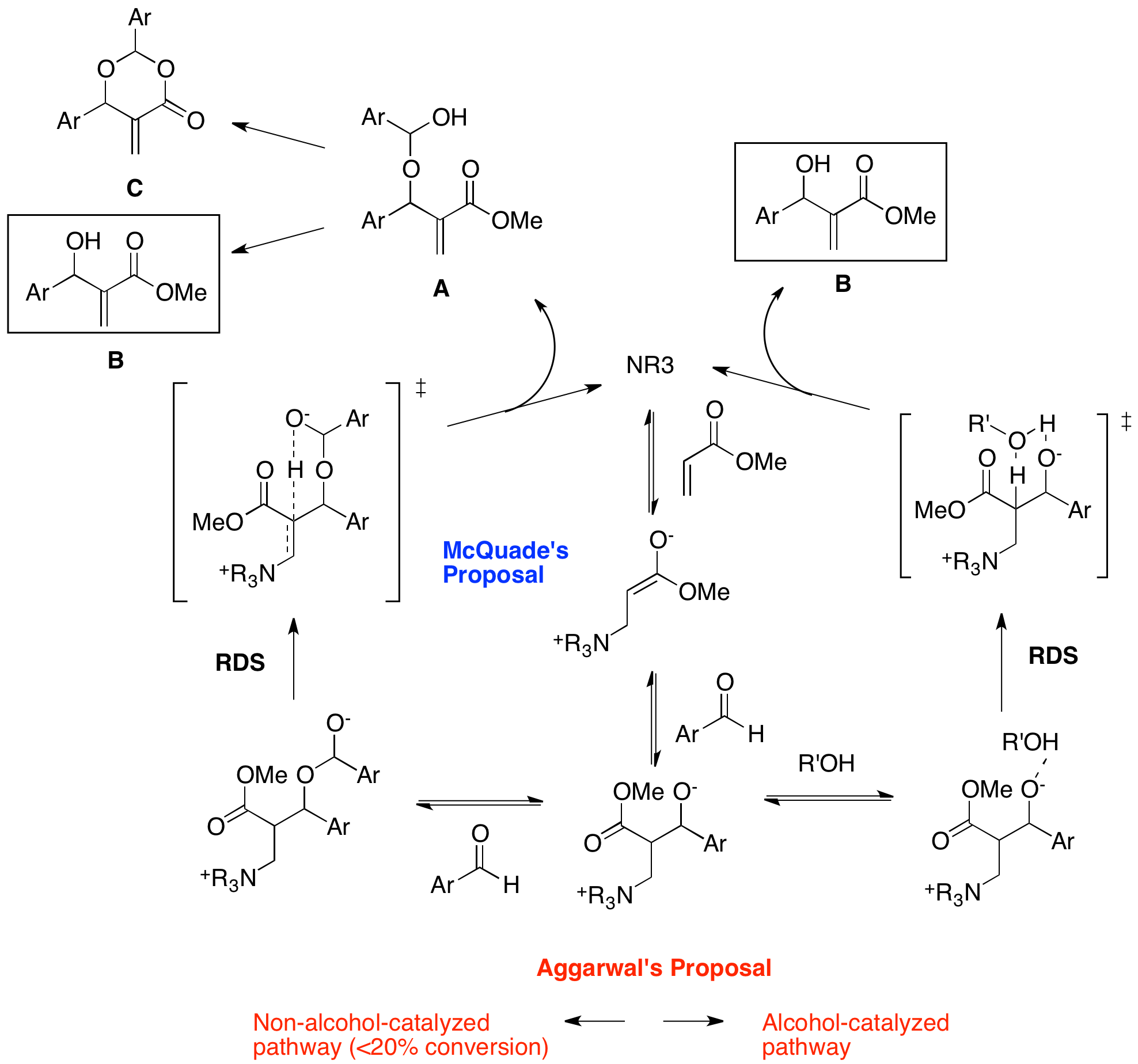

While McQuade's and Aggarwal's studies received much attention, unequivocal proof of intermediate A's role remained elusive as of 2012. Because A could be formed by separate addition of B to an aldehyde, any isolated A and C could be the result of side reactions, rather than the MBH itself. Nor has a convincing explanation yet been presented for Hill and Isaac's original first-order data.

Aggarwal's modification has its own controversies. If it is correct, then the rate-determining step changes from proton transfer to aldol addition over the course of the reaction — but subsequent computational studies have concluded that proton transfer still has the highest barrier even late into the reaction's process. On the other hand, Coelho and Eberlin et al have obtained electrospray-mass-spectroscopy data that is structural evidence for two different forms of the reaction's proton transfer step.

== Scope and limitations ==
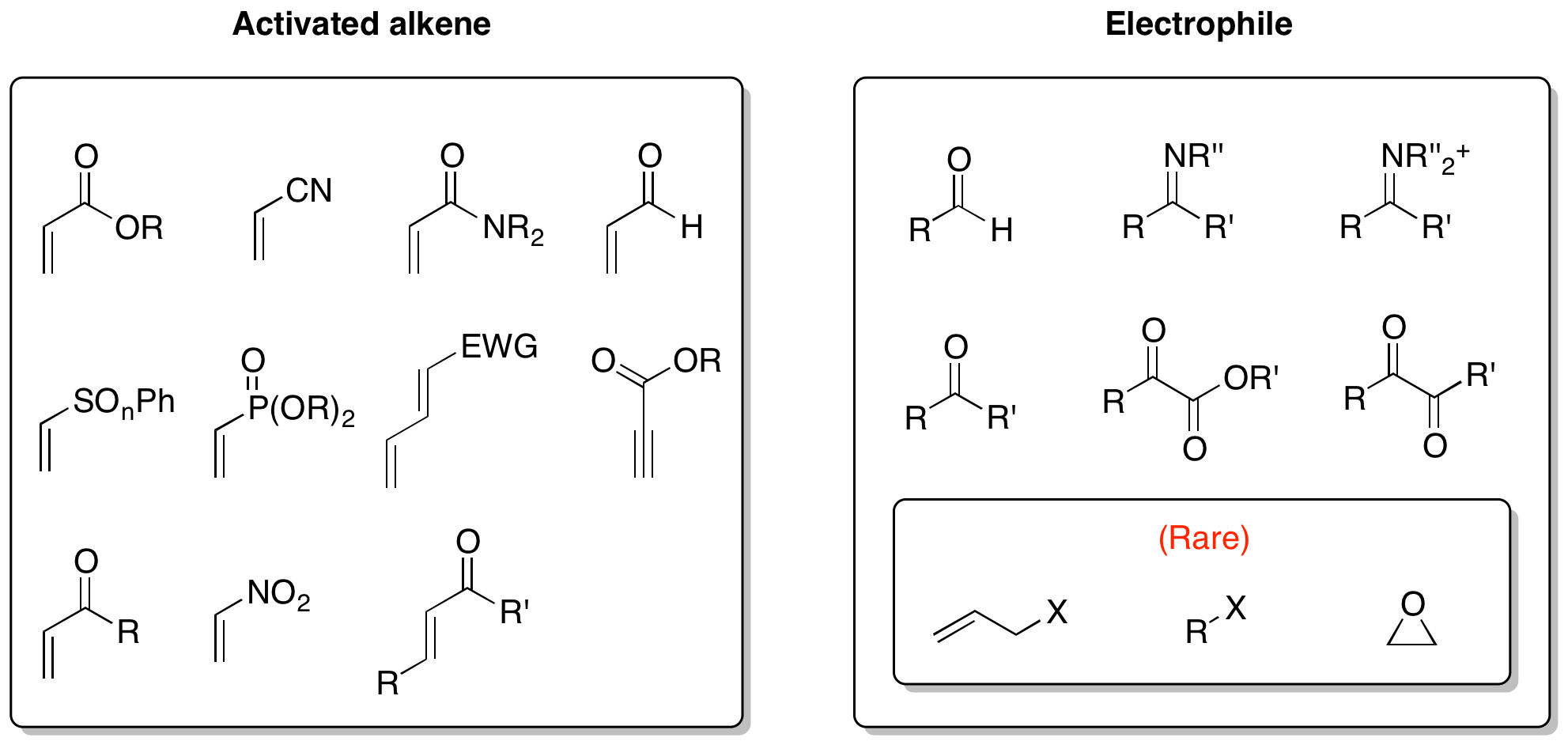

The MBH reaction is extremely general. In most cases the electrophile is an aldehyde, ketone (but see below), or imine (latterly the aza-Baylis–Hillman reaction); but allyl halides, alkyl halides, and epoxides are also possible. Using an allene instead of a simple alkene as the precursor gives an intermediate that can react at the γ carbon rather than at the α.

At the same time, it can be challenging to develop suitable reaction conditions. The reaction is slow (times of a fortnight or longer are not uncommon, even with 25-100 mol % catalyst), especially with (as alkene) β-substituted activated olefins, vinyl sulfones, or vinyl sulfoxides; or (as electrophile) hindered aliphatic aldehydes or electron-rich benzaldehydes. Ketones are generally not reactive enough under ordinary conditions to take part in a synthetically useful manner. For example, reaction between sterically hindered t-butyl acrylate and benzaldehyde with catalytic DABCO in the absence of solvent required 4 weeks to give moderate conversion to the final product.

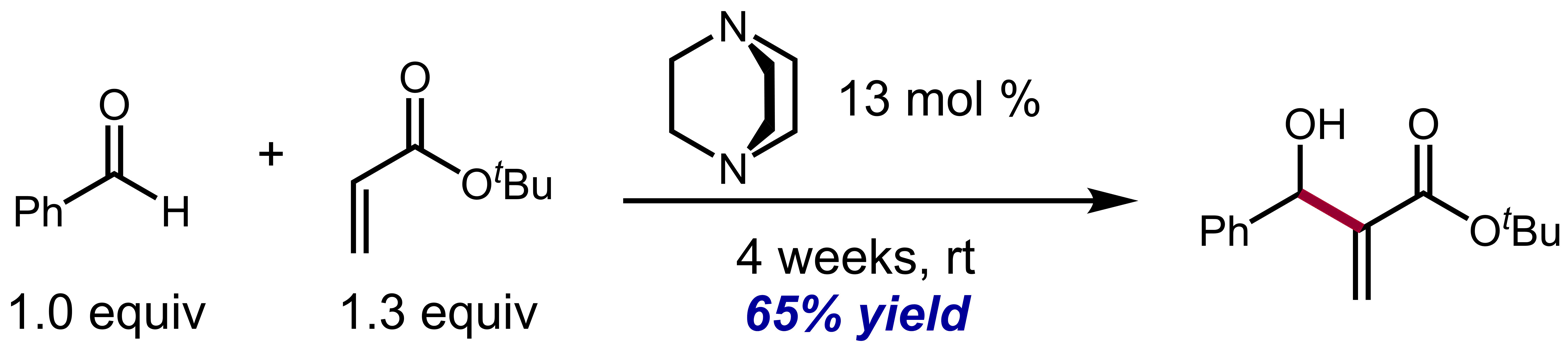

In aprotic solvents, the reaction rate is even slower, although recovery is possible with protic additives (e.g. alcohols and carboxylic acids).

At such low rates, the activity of the substrates may induce competing side-reactions: acroleins also oligomerize and allenoates cycloadd. Allyl-halide and alkyl-epoxide electrophiles also often prove unruly. The MBH reaction of an aryl vinyl ketone with an aldehyde is not straightforward (but see § Sila-MBH reaction), since the reactive aryl vinyl ketone readily undergoes Michael addition to another molecule of the aryl vinyl ketone, which then adds to the aldehyde to form a double-MBH adduct.

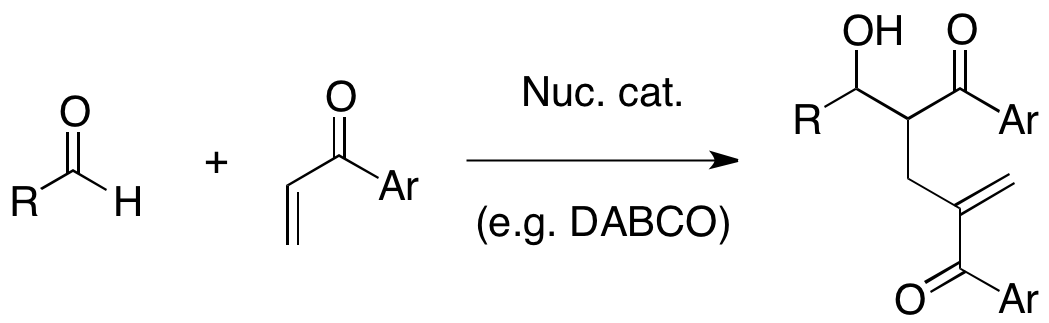

Due to the highly negative volume of activation, sluggish Baylis–Hillman reactions — including ketonic ones — can be realized by conducting the reaction under high pressure (up to 20 kbar).

== Variants ==
=== Sila-MBH reaction ===
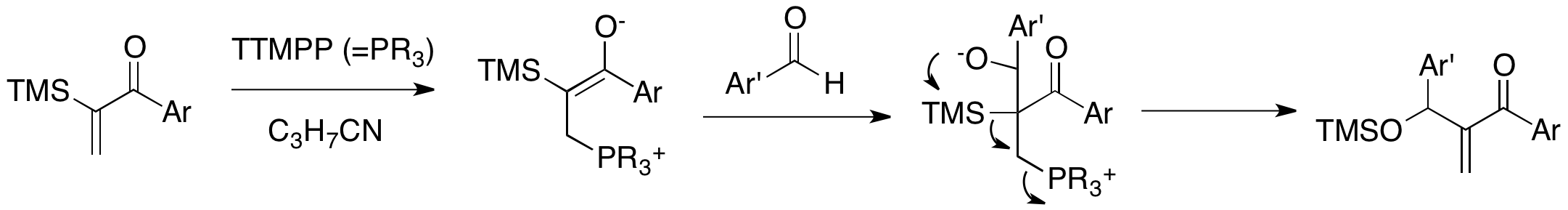

In the sila-MBH reaction, α-silylated vinyl aryl ketones couple to aldehydes in the presence of catalytic TTMPP, a large triarylphosphine reagent. The zwitterionic enolate produced upon addition of nucleophilic catalyst to the enone adds to an aldehyde carbonyl to generate an alkoxide. This alkoxide undergoes a subsequent 1,3-Brook rearrangement and elimination cascade to afford a siloxy-methylene enone and release the catalyst.

=== Rauhut–Currier reaction ===
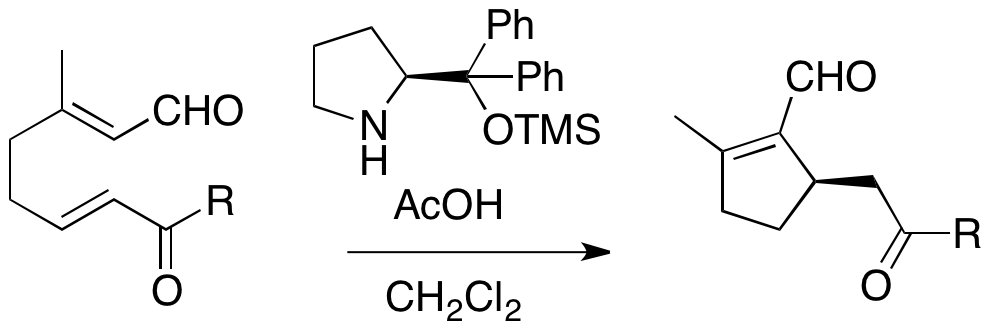

The Rauhut–Currier reaction is a vinylogous analogoue of the MBH reaction, in which the electrophile is a Michael acceptor, not an aldehyde or an imine. Intermolecular Rauhut–Currier reactions typically exhibit poor chemoselectivity, because the reaction couples two activated alkenes, but intramolecular Rauhut–Currier reactions have been employed. For example, cyclization of α,β-unsaturated aldehydes can be performed in the presence of proline derivative and acetic acid, affording enantioenriched products.

=== Tandem strategies ===
As mentioned above, the slow rate of the MBH reaction often enables side-reactions on its activated substrates. In tandem reaction strategies, this is a virtue, for it enables syntheses with high atom economy. For example, in the three-component coupling of aldehydes, amines, and activated alkenes, the aldehyde reacts with the amine to produce an imine prior to forming the aza-MBH adduct, as in the reaction of aryl aldehydes, diphenylphosphinamide, and methyl vinyl ketone, in the presence of TiCl_{4}, triphenylphosphine, and triethylamine:

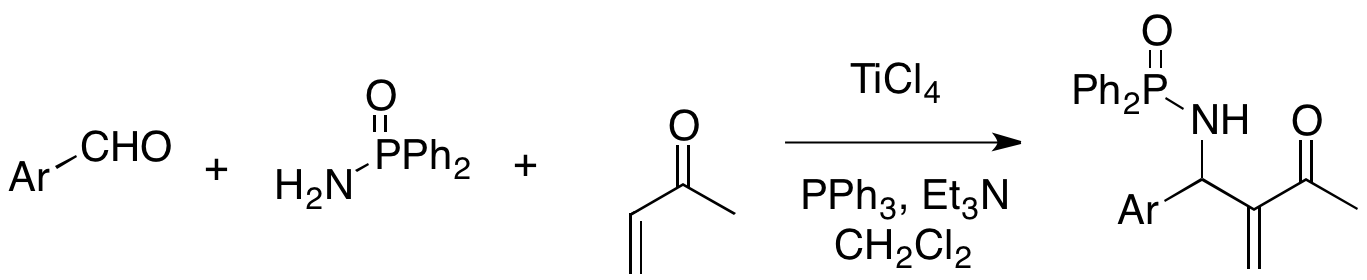

Likewise, activated acetylenes can undergo conjugate addition and remain an activated alkene for the MBH reaction, as in the following enantioselective cyclization reaction in which a phenolate nucleophile adds to a functionalized enyne before aza-MBH ring closure catalyzed by a chiral amine base.

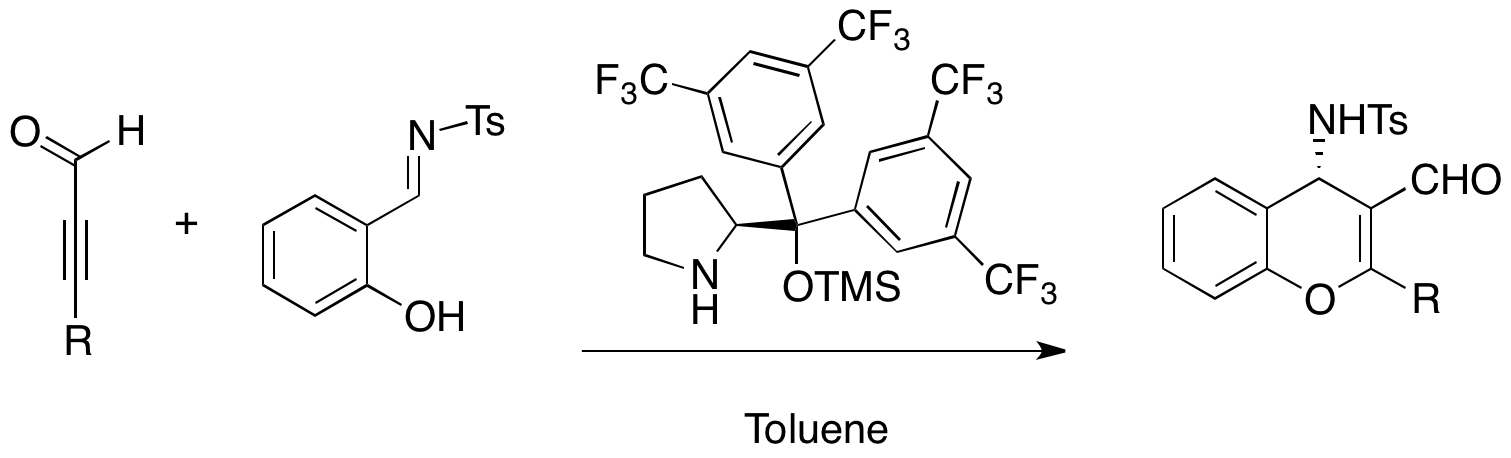

== Asymmetric synthesis ==
=== Chiral auxiliaries ===
Oppolzer's sultam can be used as a chiral auxiliary for an asymmetric MBH reaction. When an acrylate substituted with the Oppolzer's sultam reacted with various aldehydes in the presence of DABCO catalyst, optically pure 1,3-dioxan-4-ones were afforded with cleavage of the auxiliary (67–98% yield, >99% ee). The cyclic products could be converted into desired MBH products by use of camphorsulfonic acid and methanol.

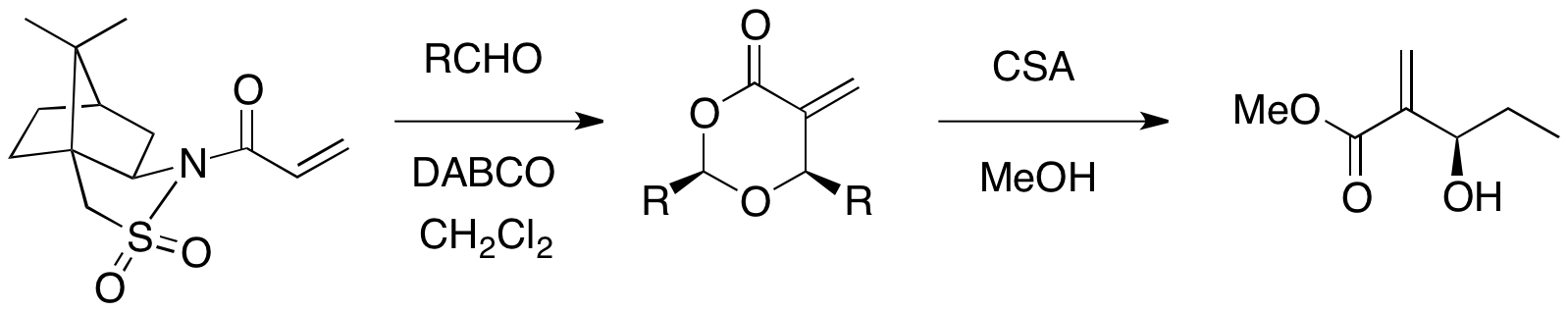

A related hydrazide auxiliary is the chiral acryloylhydrazide, which reacts diastereoselectively with aldehydes. Both diastereomers could be obtained with different choice of solvents (DMSO vs. mixed THF and H_{2}O), suggesting that the transition structure conformation is solvent-influenced.

Chiral allenes and imines can also be employed for an asymmetric DABCO-catalyzed aza-MBH reaction. Optically active 10-phenylsulfonylisobornyl buta-2,3-dienoate reacts with an aryl imine to afford α-allenylamine in a diastereoselective manner (37–57% yield).

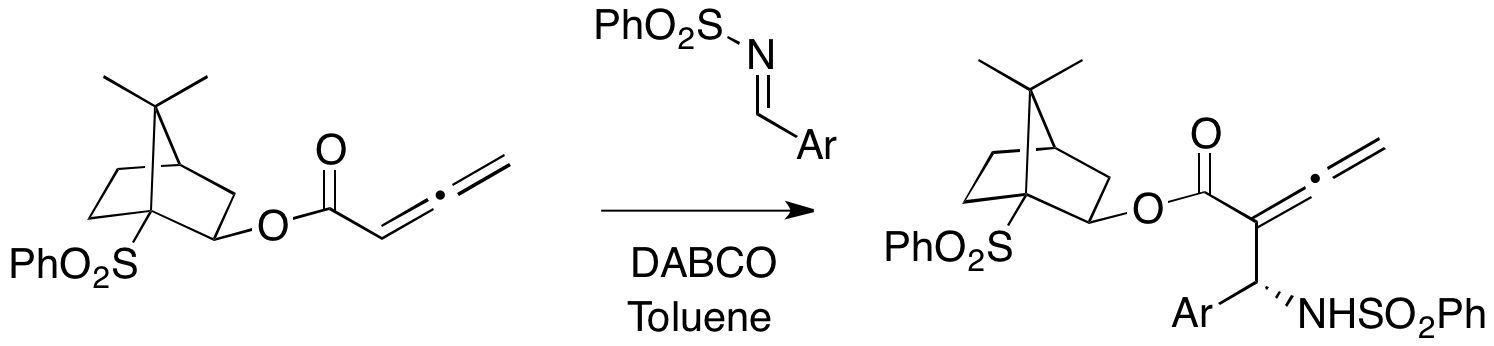

=== Chiral Lewis-basic catalyst ===
Some enantioselective MBH reactions employ chiral tertiary amine catalysts. For example, β-ICD, a cinchona alkaloid derivative, is famous among the quinidine framework-based catalysts, and catalyzed an enantioselective MBH reaction with 1,1,1,3,3,3,-hexafluoroisopropyl acrylate as the activated alkene:

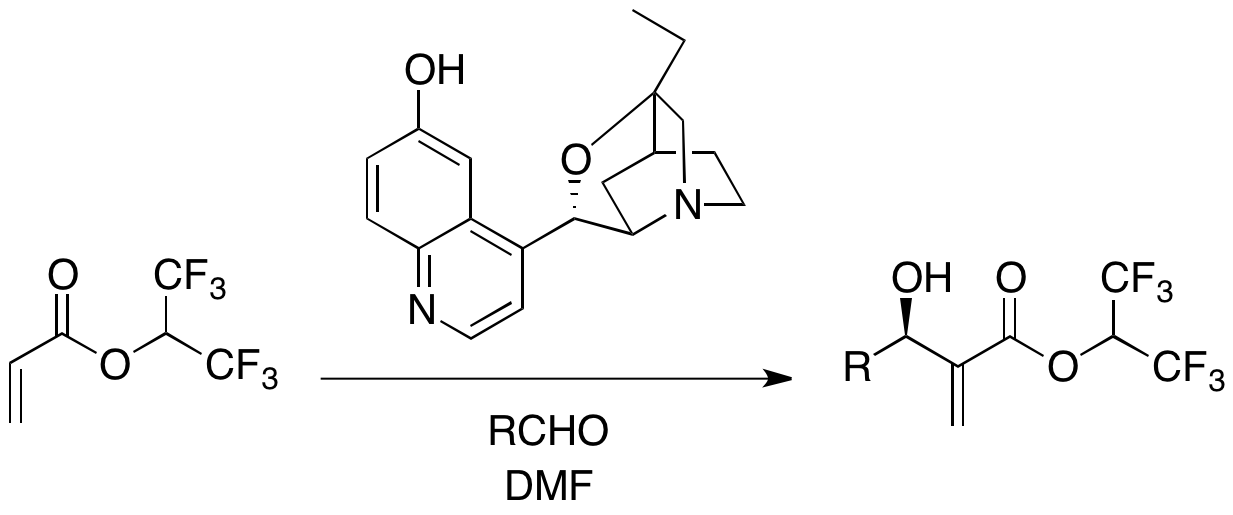

The phenolic oxygen of β-ICD was shown to be important in the reaction, implying that β-ICD acts as a Brønsted–Lowry acid, not just a nucleophile.

Cyclopentenone and various aromatic and aliphatic aldehydes undergo an asymmetric reaction using Fu's planar chiral DMAP catalyst in isopropanol (54–96% yield, 53–98% ee). In this case, magnesium iodide as a Lewis acid cocatalyst was required to accelerate the reaction.

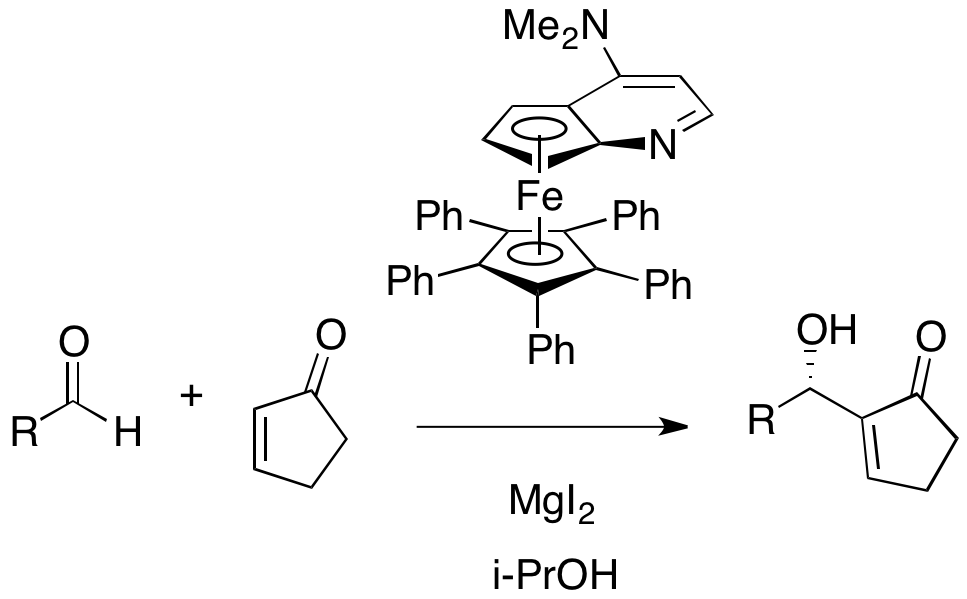

P-Chiral phosphines have been investigated.

Simple diamines can also be employed as MBH catalysts. Methyl vinyl ketone and various substituted benzaldehydes were found to undergo asymmetric MBH reaction. The chiral pyrrolidine catalyst was effective for ortho- and para-substituted electron-deficient benzaldehydes (75–99% yield, 8–73% ee).

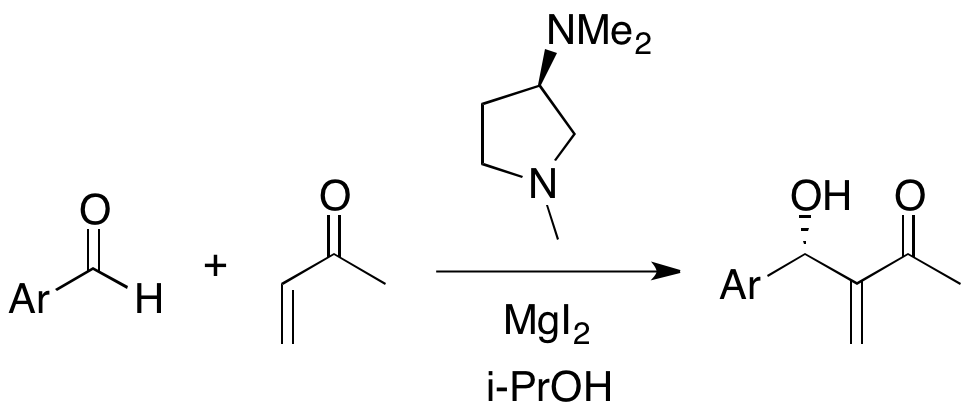

Chiral phosphine MBH catalysts often contain Brønsted–Lowry acid moieties in their backbones. For example, chiral phosphines containing a Lewis base, a Brønsted–Lowry acid, and an acid-activated Brønsted–Lowry base were developed for an asymmetric aza-MBH reaction (86–96% yield, 79–92% ee). The Brønsted–Lowry acid and base moieties were proposed to be involved in the stabilization of zwitterionic species in a stereoselective manner.

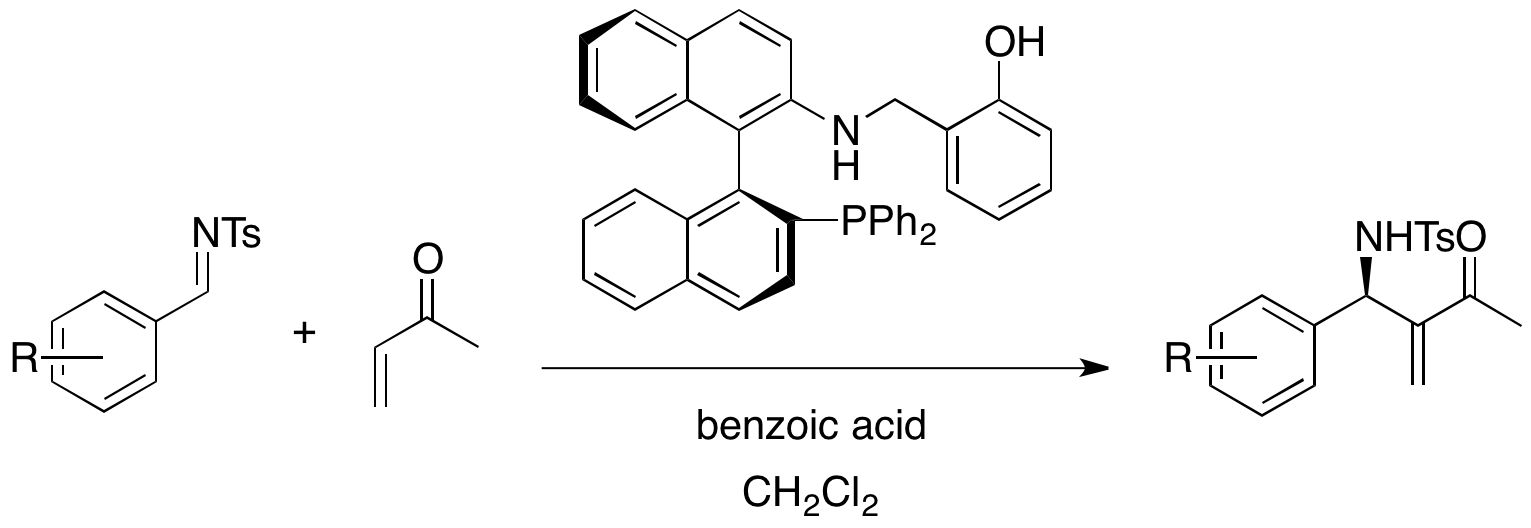

BINOL-derived chiral phosphine catalyst is also effective for an asymmetric aza-MBH reaction of N-tosyl imines with activated alkenes such as methyl vinyl ketone and phenyl acrylate.

In addition, a distinct class of chiral phosphine-squaramide molecules could effectively catalyze an intramolecular asymmetric MBH reaction. ω-formylenones reacted to afford enantioenriched cyclic products at ambient temperature (64–98% yield, 88–93% ee).

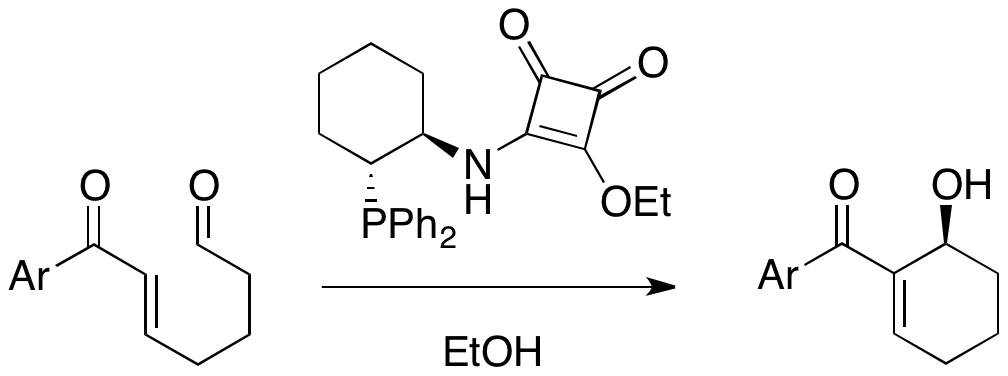

=== Chiral Lewis acid catalyst ===
Chiral Lewis acid catalysts have been given interests as they could activate the electron-withdrawing group in an enantioselective manner. Chiral cationic oxazaborolidinium catalysts were shown to be effective in the three-component coupling of α,β-acetylenic esters, aldehydes, and trimethylsilyl iodide (50–99% yield, 62–94% ee). Both enantiomeric products could be obtained by using different enantiomers of the catalyst.

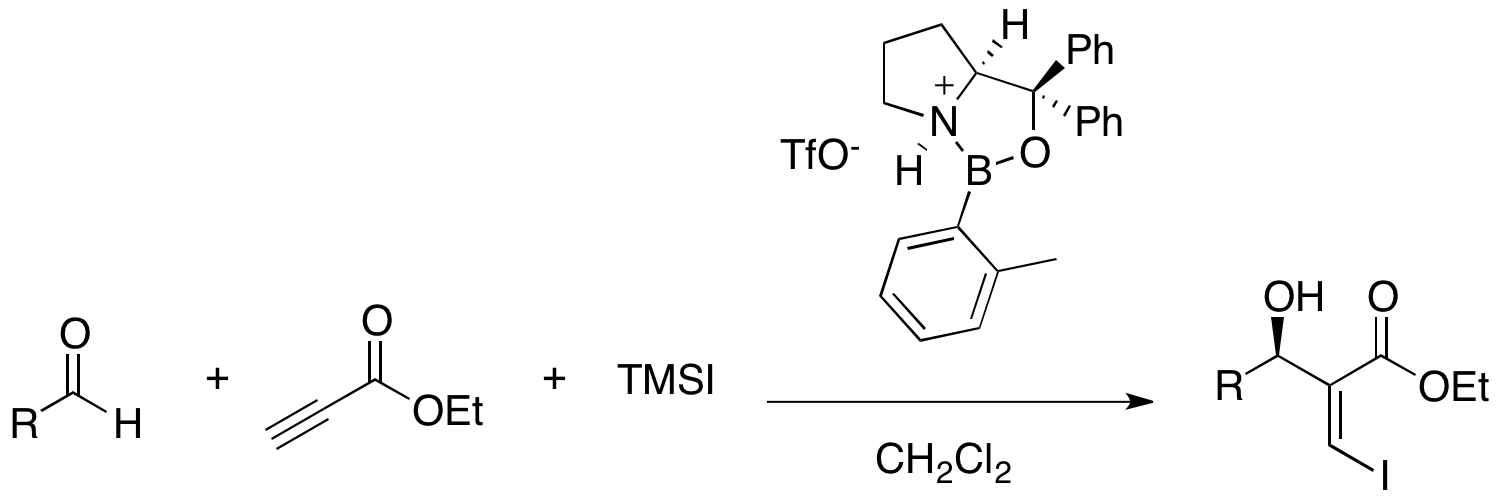

Complex of metal salt and chiral ligand is a viable strategy, too. La(OTf)_{3} and camphor-derived chiral ligands could induce enantioselectivity in a DABCO-catalyzed MBH reaction of various aldehydes and acrylates (25–97% yield, 6–95% ee). For these cases, multidentate ligands were usually employed to chelate with the metal, which activates both the zwitterionic enolate and the aldehyde.

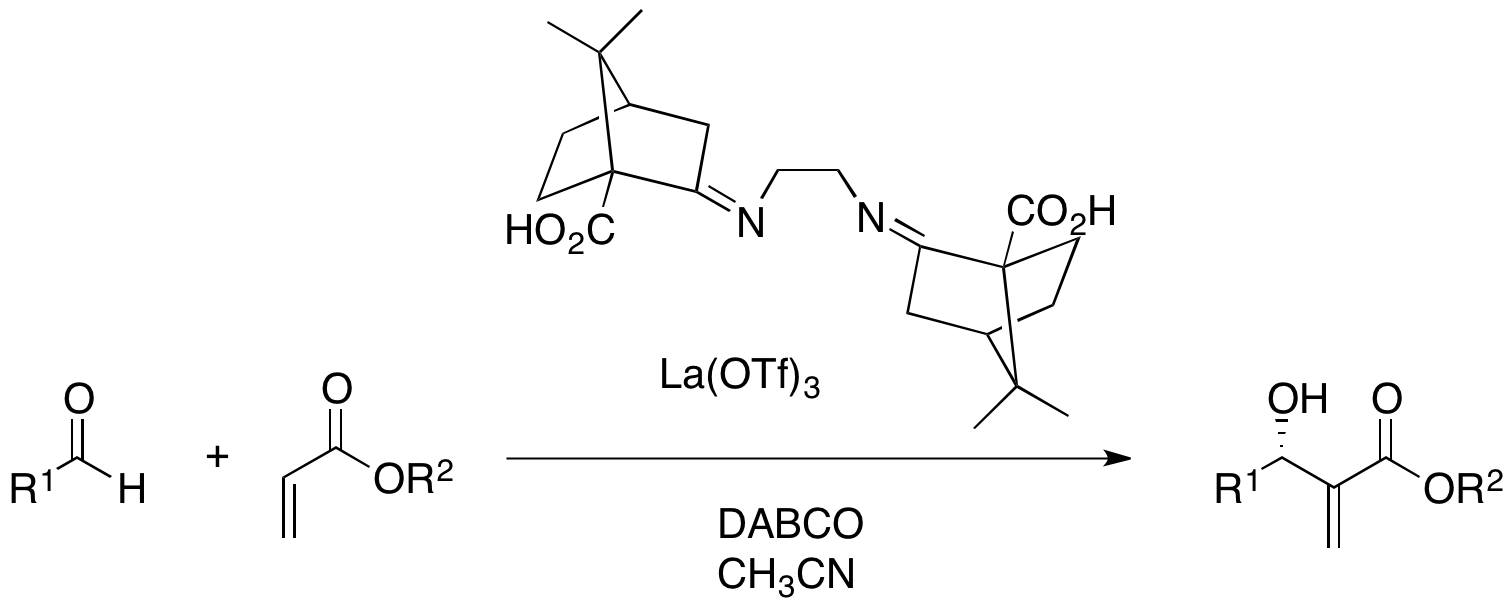

La(O-iPr)_{3} and BINOL-derived ligand system, in conjunction with catalytic DABCO, also works for an asymmetric aza-MBH reaction of various N-diphenylphosphinoyl imines and methyl acrylate. Aryl, heteroaryl, and alkenyl imines were all suitable for good yield and enantioselectivity.

Chiral palladium(II) pincer complexes function as Lewis acid in the enantioselective DABCO-catalyzed aza-MBH reaction of acrylonitrile and various tosyl imines to afford functionalized α-methylene-β-aminonitriles (75–98% yield, 76–98% ee). Silver acetate is required to activate the palladium bromide precatalyst in the catalytic cycle.

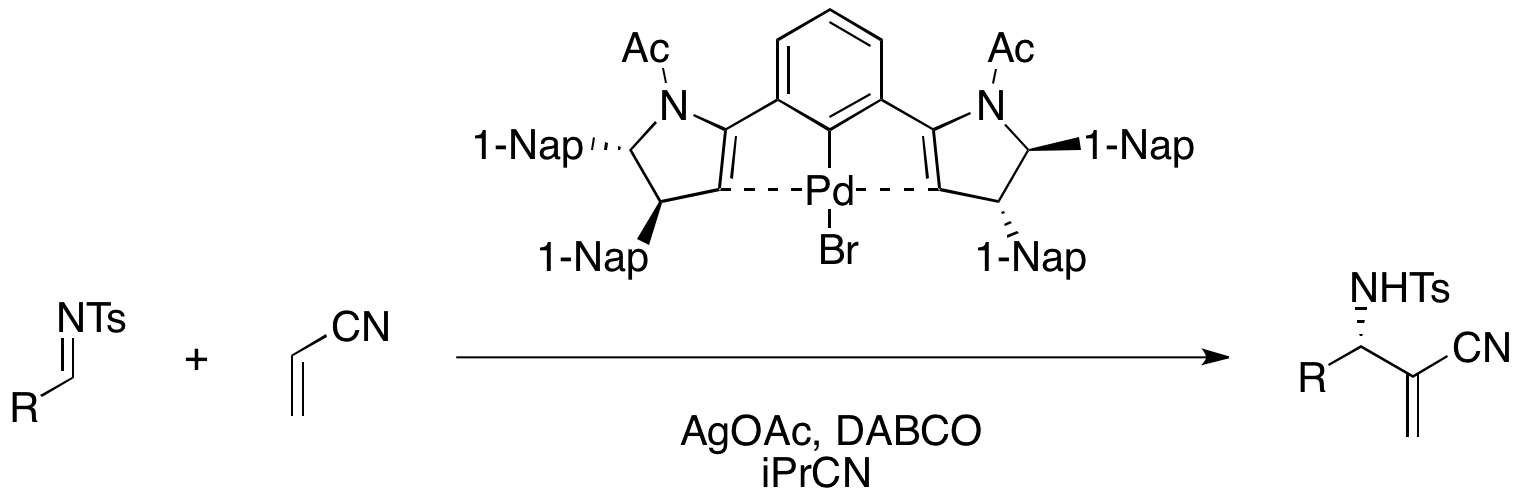

=== Chiral Brønsted–Lowry acid cocatalyst ===
A variety of chiral thiourea catalysts are under investigation for asymmetric MBH reactions. Chiral thiourea and bis(thiourea) catalysts can be effective in DABCO-catalyzed MBH and aza-MBH reactions. Jacobsen's thiourea catalyst performs an enantioselective aza-MBH reaction, for example (25–49% yield, 87–99% ee).

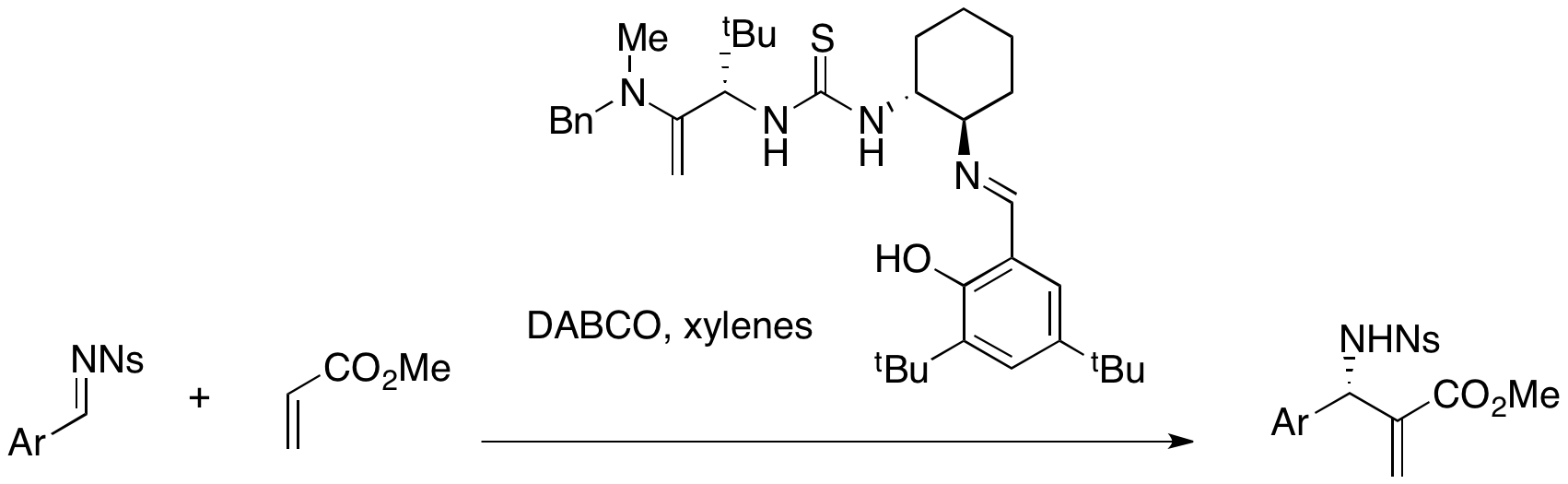

While simple thiourea requires a nucleophilic catalyst in conjunction, bifunctional catalysts such as phosphine-thioureas can be used alone for asymmetric MBH reactions. For example, various acrylates and aromatic aldehydes react in the presence of these catalysts to afford either enantiomeric MBH adducts (32–96% yield, 9–77% ee).

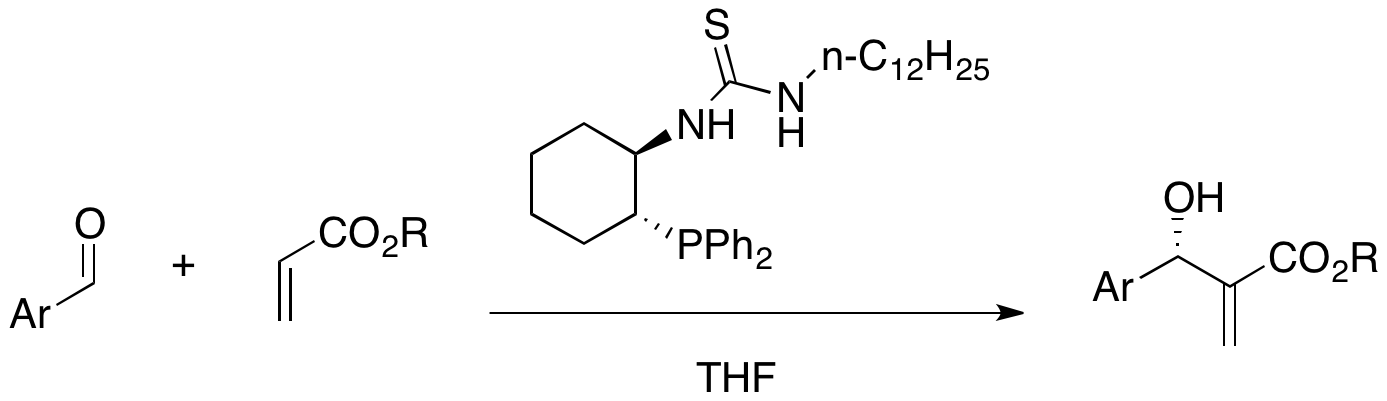

MBH reaction can involve proline derivative as a cocatalyst. It was proposed that imidazole nucleophilic catalyst and proline effect the reaction via iminium intermediate. With (S)-proline and DABCO, α-amido sulfones and α,β-unsaturated aldehydes undergo a highly enantioselective aza-MBH reaction (46–87% yield, E/Z 10:1–19:1, 82–99% ee).

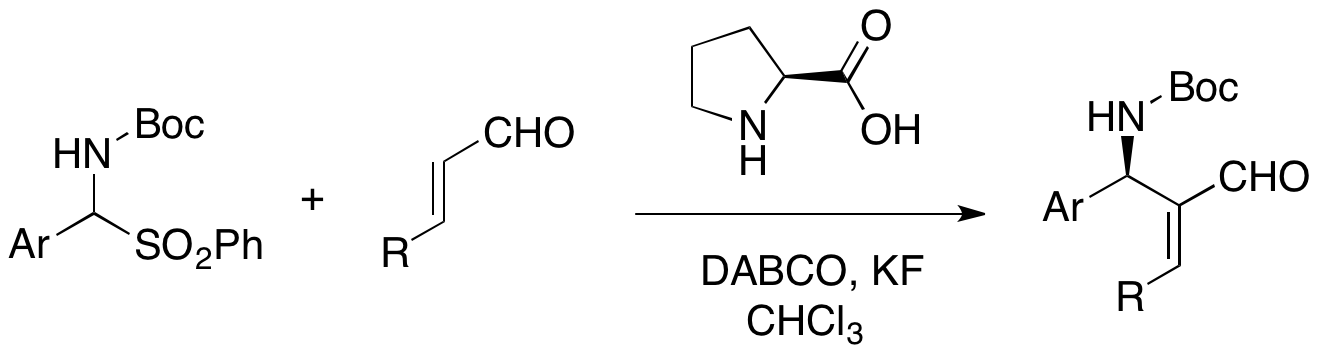

== Applications in organic synthesis ==
The Baylis–Hillman adducts and their derivatives have been extensively utilized for the generation of heterocycles and other cyclic frameworks.

MBH reactions are widely used in organic synthesis. For example, this reaction was used to construct key cyclic intermediates for syntheses of salinosporamide A, diversonol, and anatoxin-a.

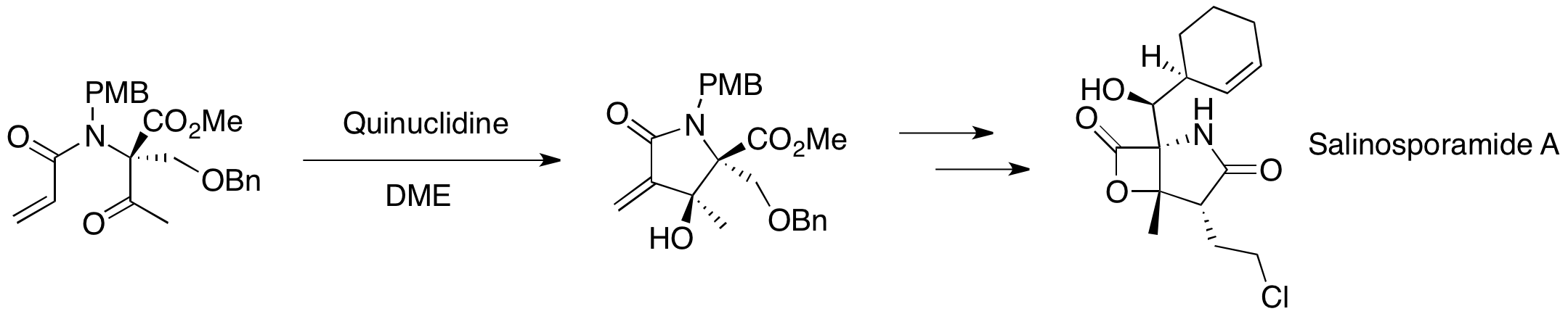

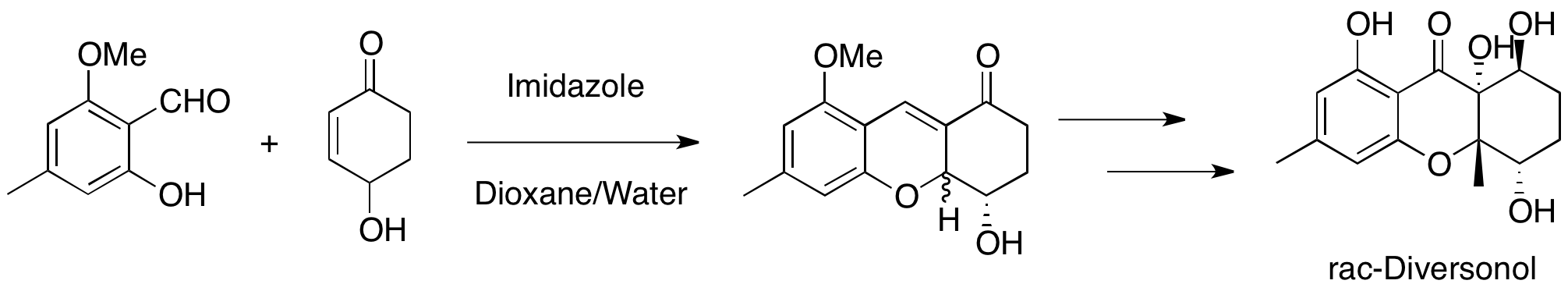

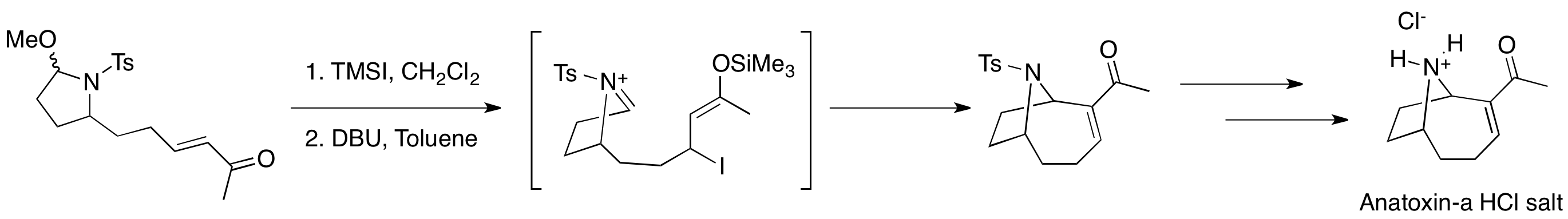
