= Tris(2,4,6-trimethoxyphenyl)phosphine =

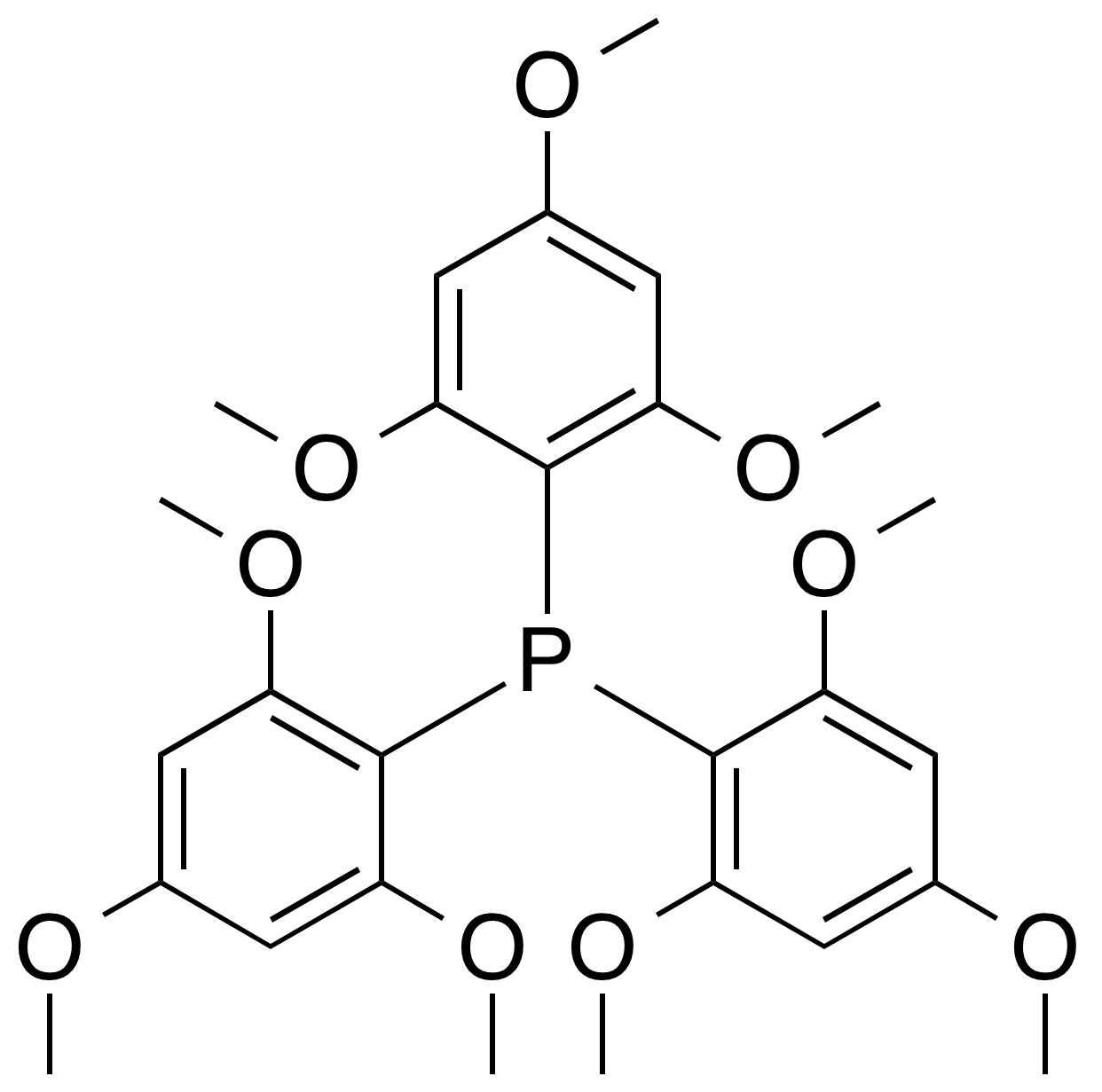

Names
- IUPAC name Tris(2,4,6-trimethoxyphenyl)phosphane
- Other names: Tris(2,4,6-trimethoxyphenyl)phosphine; TTMPP

Identifiers
CAS Number	91608-15-0
3D model (JSmol)	Interactive image
ChemSpider	11283
EC Number	811-745-3
PubChem CID	522987
CompTox Dashboard (EPA)	DTXSID60335128
- InChI: InChI=1S/C27H33O9P/c1-28-16-10-19(31-4)25(20(11-16)32-5)37(26-21(33-6)12-17(29-2)13-22(26)34-7)27-23(35-8)14-18(30-3)15-24(27)36-9/h10-15H,1-9H3 Key: JQKHNBQZGUKYPX-UHFFFAOYSA-N
- SMILES: COC1=CC(=C(C(=C1)OC)P(C2=C(C=C(C=C2OC)OC)OC)C3=C(C=C(C=C3OC)OC)OC)OC

Properties
Chemical formula	C_{27}H_{33}O_{9}P
Molar mass	532.526 g·mol^{−1}
Melting point	79–81 °C (174–178 °F; 352–354 K)
Boiling point	360 or 377 °C (680 or 711 °F; 633 or 650 K)
- Except where otherwise noted, data are given for materials in their standard state (at 25 °C [77 °F], 100 kPa). Infobox references

Tris(2,4,6-trimethoxyphenyl)phosphine (TTMPP) is a large triaryl organophosphine whose strong Lewis-basic properties make it useful as an organocatalyst for several types of chemical reactions.

== Reactions ==
TTMPP removes the trimethylsilyl group from ketene silyl acetals (the enol ether of esters) to give enolates that can then act as strong nucleophiles. It thus serves as a catalyst for Mukaiyama aldol reactions and group-transfer chain-growth polymerization reactions.

TTMPP acts as potent Lewis-base catalyst in Michael addition reactions enabeling the use of alcohols as Michael donors.

TTMPP can act as a Michael nucleophile itself to catalyze Baylis–Hillman reactions.

== Uses ==
TTMPP is used as a ligand to form palladium-phosphine catalysts which are more reactive than triphenylphosphine-based catalysts.
