= Polydioxanone =

Synthetic polymer

poly(p-dioxanone) structure

Polydioxanone (PDO, PDS) or poly-p-dioxanone is a colorless, crystalline, biodegradable synthetic polymer.

== Monomer synthesis ==
p-Dioxanone, the cyclic monomer used primarily for the polymerization of polydioxanone, can be synthesized via several chemical routes.

The first major process was developed by Doddi and colleagues at Ethicon. In this method, ethylene glycol reacts with metallic sodium to form a monosodium salt (sodium ethylene glycoxide), which is then reacted with chloroacetic acid to yield sodium (2-hydroxyethoxy)acetate. Distillation is used to remove side products, and the intermediate salt is acidified with hydrochloric acid to convert it into a free hydroxy acid. The obtained (2-hydroxyethoxy)acetic acid is heated to 200 °C in the presence of magnesium carbonate (MgCO_{3}) to promote cyclization, forming crude p-dioxanone. The product is subsequently purified through multiple recrystallizations and distillations.

Reaction scheme for the synthesis of p-dioxanone (based on Doddi et al.)

Another method, developed by Jiang, which typically yields higher conversion rates, utilizes the oxidative dehydrogenation of diethylene glycol. Using a copper-chromium catalyst, the reaction is carried out at elevated temperatures of 220–240 °C. The crude product is dried and filtered, and reagents such as benzyl bromide and pyridine are often added to the mixture to precipitate or neutralize impurities. The mixture is then distilled and undergoes several crystallization steps to obtain highly pure p-dioxanone.

Reaction scheme for the synthesis of p-dioxanone (based on Jiang et al.)

A newer modified method based on Doddi’s approach is utilized to synthesize substituted derivatives of the monomer, such as methyl-substituted p-dioxanone (MeDX). In this process, sodium glycolate reacts with 2-chloropropionic acid, followed by the intramolecular esterification of the hydroxyl acid using N,N'-dicyclohexylcarbodiimide|dicyclohexylcarbodiimide (DCC) as a catalyst. Purification of the resulting derivative monomer is typically performed via cryodistillation.

== Chemistry ==
Chemically, polydioxanone is a polymer of multiple repeating ether-ester units. It is obtained by ring-opening polymerization of the monomer p-dioxanone. The process requires heat and an organometallic catalyst like zirconium acetylacetone or zinc L-lactate. It is characterized by a glass transition temperature in the range of −10 and 0 °C and a crystallinity of about 55%. For the production of sutures, polydioxanone is generally extruded into fibers, however care should be taken to process the polymer to the lowest possible temperature, in order to avoid its spontaneous depolymerization back to the monomer. The ether oxygen group in the backbone of the polymer chain is responsible for its flexibility.

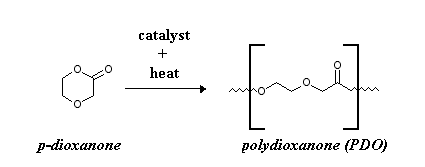
Ring opening polymerization of p-dioxanone to polydioxanone

== Medical use ==
Polydioxanone is used for biomedical applications, particularly in the preparation of surgical sutures. Other biomedical applications include orthopedics, maxillofacial surgery, plastic surgery, drug delivery, cardiovascular applications, and tissue engineering. For example, with the use of electrospinning, the flexible nature of PDS allows the control of its structure and can be used in applications such as tissue scaffolding.

It is degraded by hydrolysis, and the end products are mainly excreted in urine, the remainder being eliminated by the digestive system or exhaled as CO_{2}. The biomaterial is completely reabsorbed in 6 months and can be seen only a minimal foreign body reaction tissue in the vicinity of the implant. Materials made of PDS can be sterilized with ethylene oxide.

== See also ==
Other biodegradable polymers:

- polycaprolactone
- polyglycolide
- polylactic acid
- poly(lactic-co-glycolic acid)
- poly-3-hydroxybutyrate
