= Palladium(III) compounds =

In chemistry, compounds of palladium(III) feature the noble metal palladium in the unusual +3 oxidation state (in most of its compounds, palladium has the oxidation state II). Compounds of Pd(III) occur in mononuclear and dinuclear forms. Palladium(III) is most often invoked, not observed in mechanistic organometallic chemistry.

== Mononuclear compounds ==
Pd(III) has a d^{7} electronic configuration, which leads to a Jahn–Teller distorted octahedral geometry. The geometry could also be viewed as being intermediate between square-planar and octahedral. These complexes are low-spin and paramagnetic.

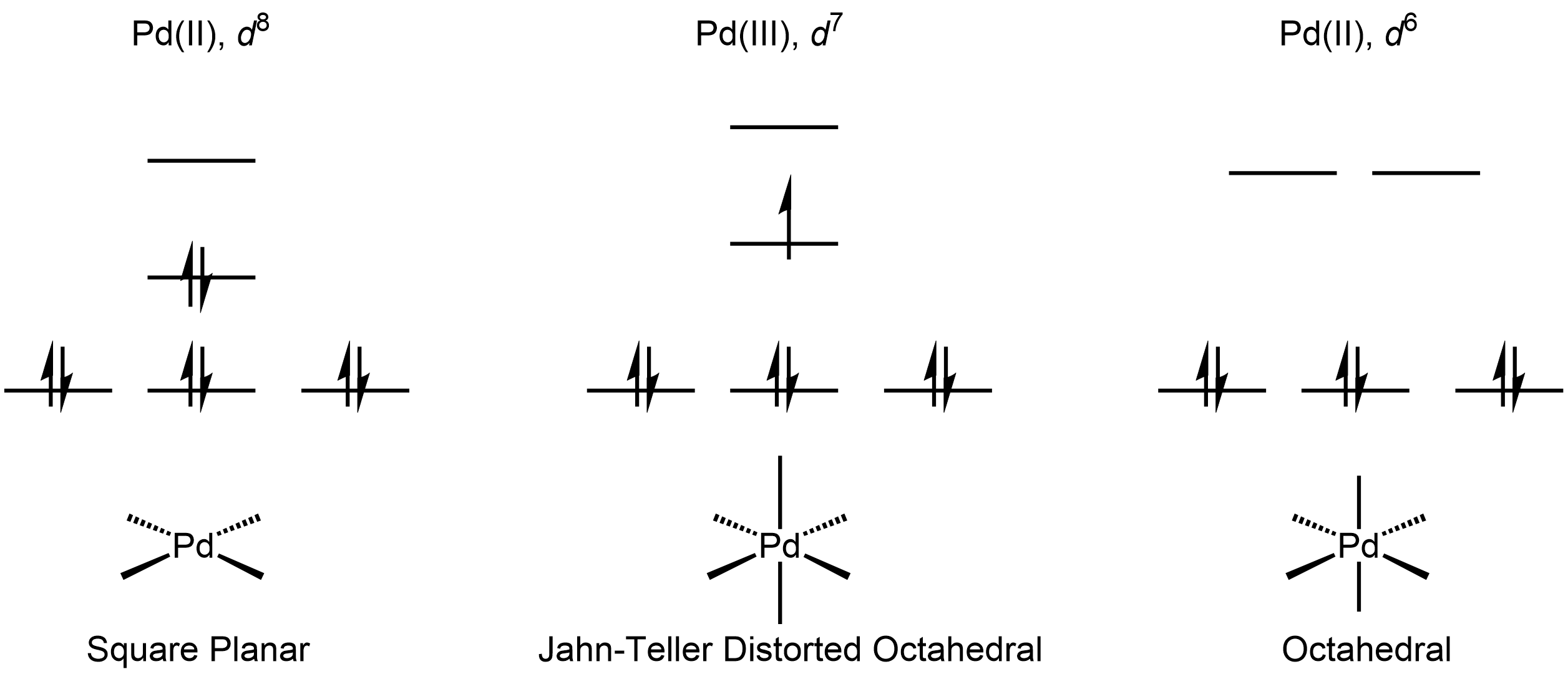

The first Pd(III) complex characterized by X-ray crystallography was reported in 1987. It was obtained by oxidation of the 1,4,7-trithiacyclononane (ttcn) complex [Pd(ttcn)_{2}]^{3+}. X-ray crystallography revealed the expected Jahn–Teller distorted octahedral geometry, in spite of the highly symmetric structure of the ligand.

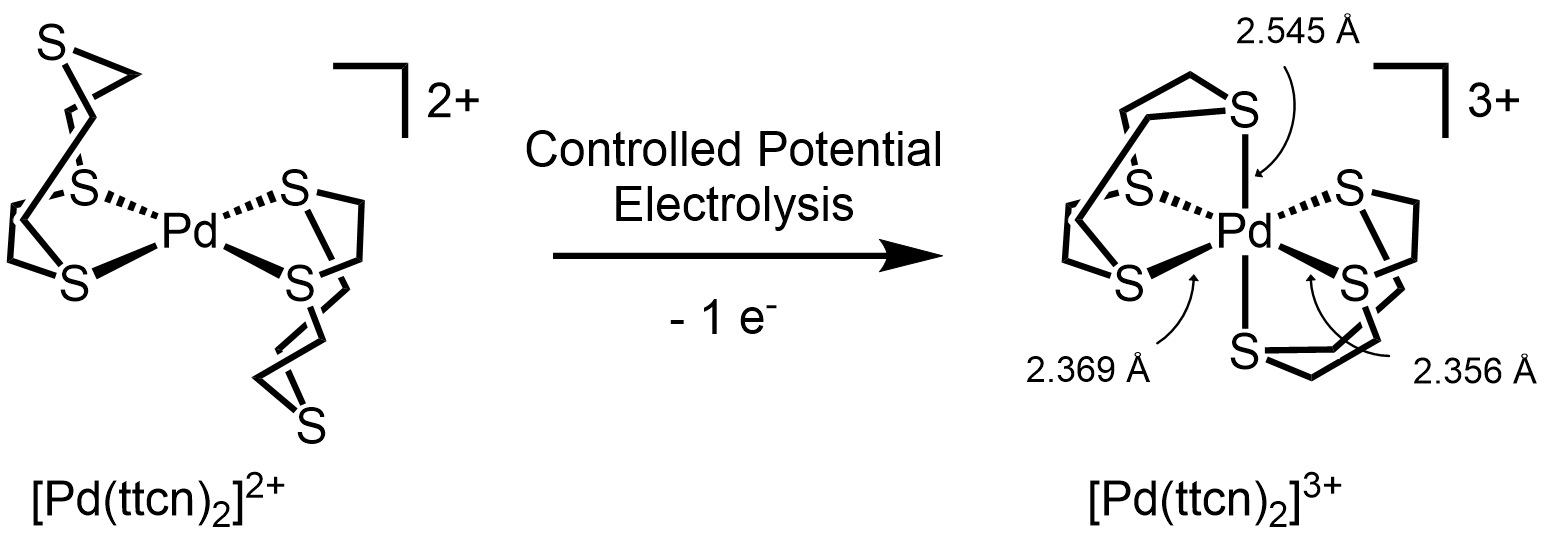

The first organometallic Pd(III) complex characterized by X-ray crystallography was reported in 2010. Organopalladium complexes supported with a macrocyclic tetradentate ligand undergo single-electron oxidation to give Pd(III) species that is stabilized by the axially-positioned amine. The authors propose that while the axial nitrogen stabilize a distorted octahedral geometry, the t-Bu group and the rigidity of the macrocyclic structure inhibits the oxidation to a more conventional octahedral Pd(IV).

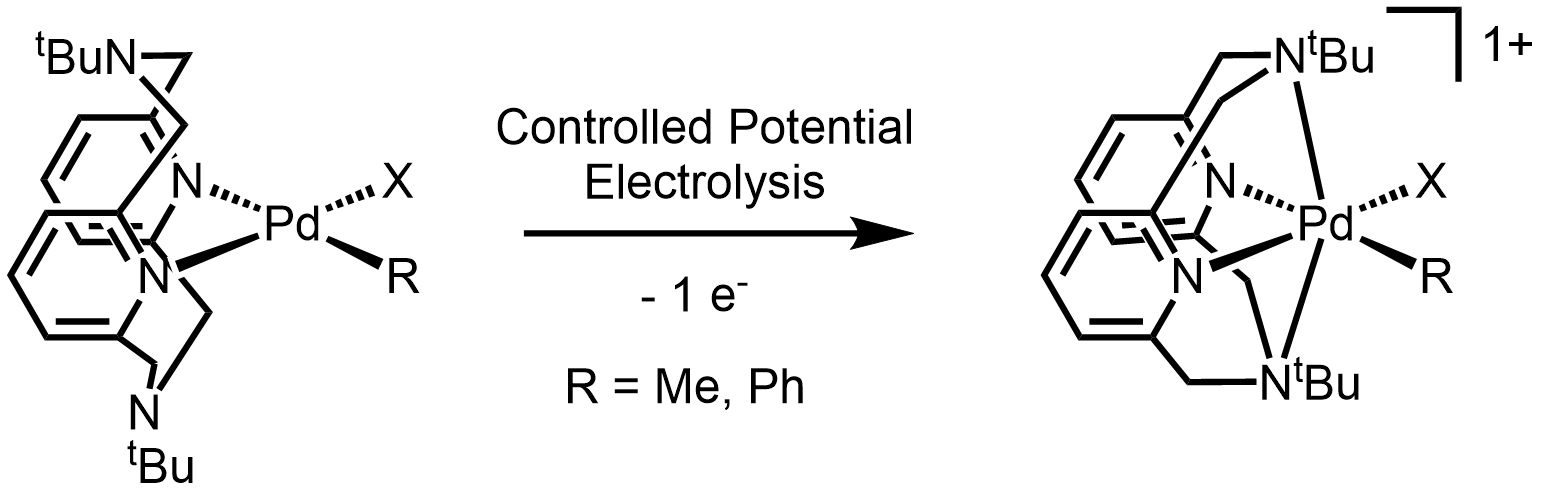

A metallaborane complex containing Pd(III) has also been reported, which contains a B_{11} borane cage ligand.

== Dinuclear compounds ==
=== Structure ===
Pairs of Pd(III) centers can couple, giving rise to a Pd–Pd bond. In contrast to the mononuclear Pd(III) complexes, the Pd(III)-Pd(III) dimers are diamagnetic.

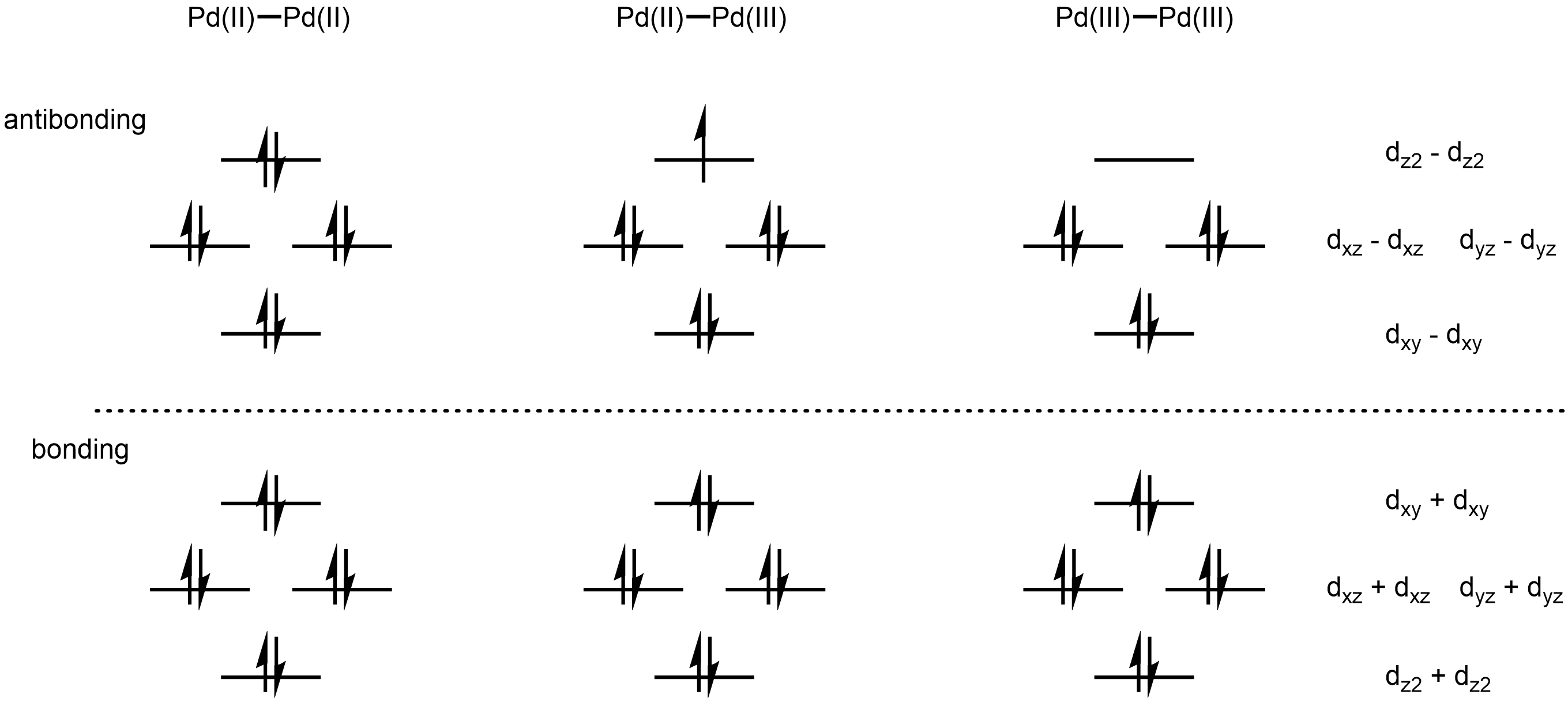

The first example of a dipalladium(III) complex was obtained by oxidation of dinuclear Pd(II) complex of triazabicyclodecene.

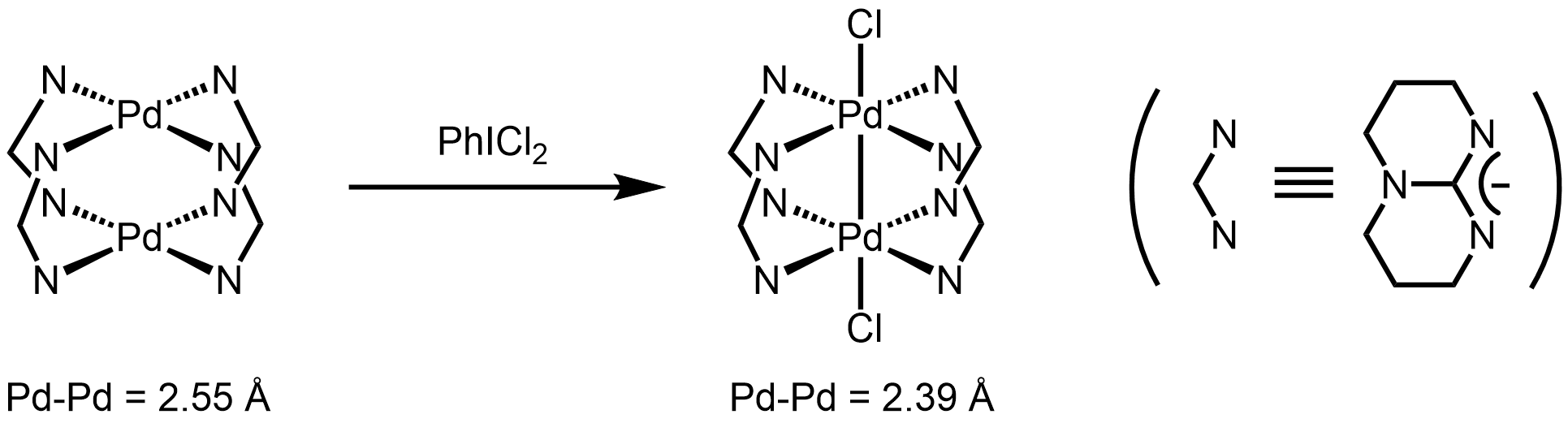

The first organometallic dinuclear Pd(III) complexes were reported in 2006 by Cotton and coworkers as well. These complexes catalyze the diborylation of terminal olefins. Due to the facile reduction of these complexes to Pd(II) species by diborane, the authors proposed that the dinuclear Pd(III) complexes serve as precatalysts for active Pd(II) catalysts.

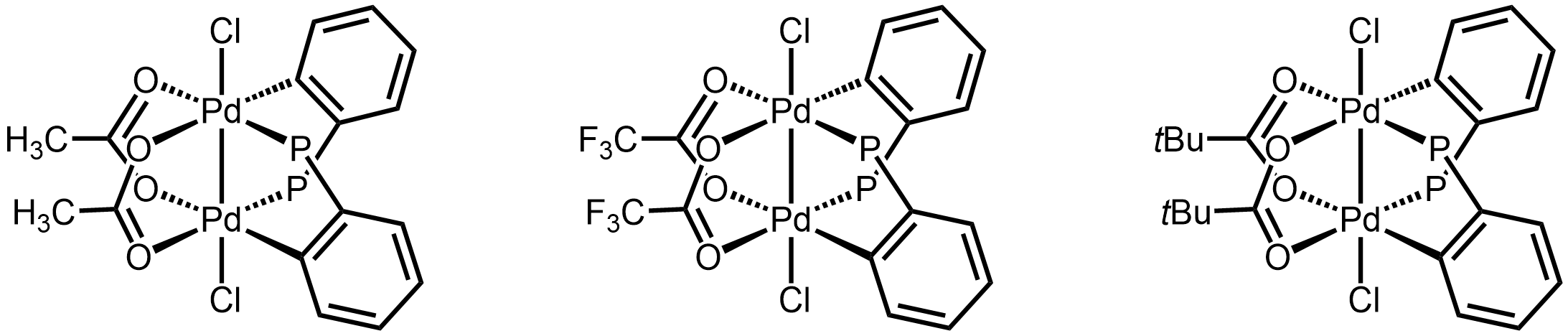
Dipalladium(III) complexes derived from ortho-metallated triphenylphosphine (Ph groups omitted for clarity).

=== Reactivity ===
The reactivity of dinuclear Pd(III) species as active catalytic intermediate is mostly discussed in the context of C-H activation. While it was proposed that Pd-catalyzed oxidative C-H functionalization reactions involve a Pd(IV) intermediate, Ritter and coworkers first postulated that these oxidative reactions could involve a dinuclear Pd(III) intermediate instead of Pd(IV).

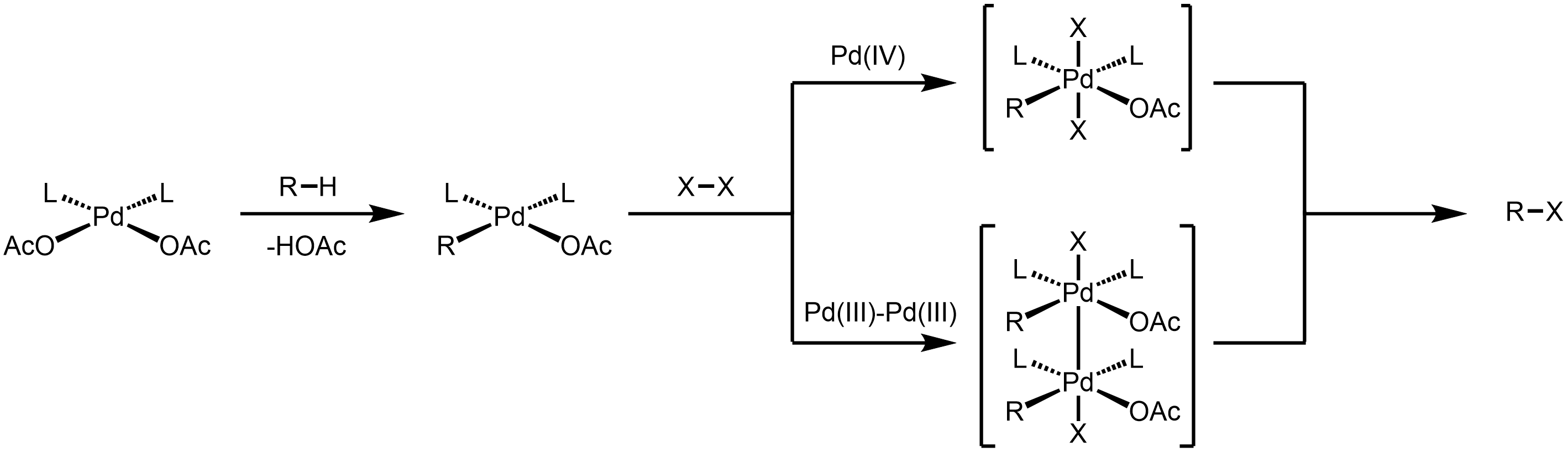

Dinuclear Pd species are involved in Pd-catalyzed C-H chlorination. Through X-ray crystallography, Ritter unambiguously showed that dinuclear Pd(III) complex is formed when the palladacycle is treated with two-electron oxidant, and such dinuclear complex undergoes C-Cl reductive elimination under ambient temperature. Both experimental and computational data was consistent with a concerted 1,1-reductive elimination mechanism for the C-Cl forming step. The authors show that such bimetallic participation of redox event lowers the activation barrier for reductive elimination step by ~30 kcal/mol compared to a monometallic pathway.

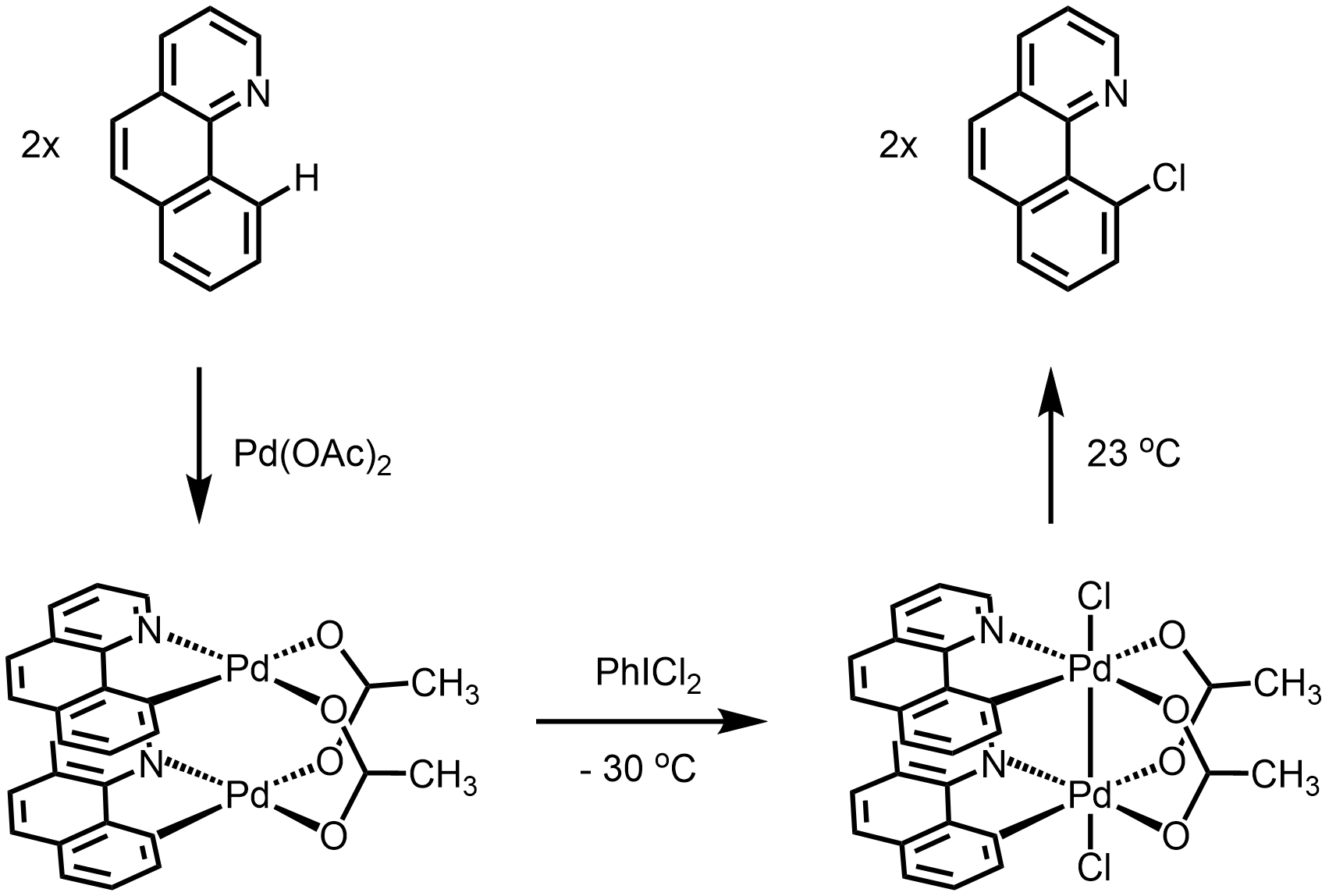

Acetoxylation of 2-phenylpyridine was also demonstrated to involve a dinuclear Pd(III) intermediate.

== See also ==
- Palladium compounds
