= Aza-Baylis–Hillman reaction =

Chemical reaction

Aza-Baylis-Hillman reaction
Named after	Anthony B. Baylis; Melville E. D. Hillman
Reaction type	Coupling reaction

Identifiers
RSC ontology ID	RXNO:0000264

The aza-Baylis–Hillman reaction or aza-BH reaction in organic chemistry is a variation of the Baylis–Hillman reaction and describes the reaction of an electron deficient alkene, usually an α,β-unsaturated carbonyl compound, with an imine in the presence of a nucleophile. The reaction product is an allylic amine. The reaction can be carried out in enantiomeric excess of up to 90% with the aid of bifunctional chiral BINOL and phosphinyl BINOL compounds, for example in the reaction of n-(4-chloro-benzylidene)-benzenesulfonamide with methyl vinyl ketone (MVK) in cyclopentyl methyl ether and toluene at −15 °C.

In one study a reaction mechanism for a specific aza-BH reaction is proposed. Given a set of reaction conditions the reaction is found to be first-order in the triphenylphosphine nucleophile, MVK and the tosylimine concentration in the rate determining step in the presence of a Brønsted acid such as phenol or benzoic acid. The presence of an acid facilitates the elimination reaction in the zwitterion by proton transfer which becomes much faster and no longer rate determining. A 6 membered cyclic transition state is proposed for this reaction step. Because this step is also reversible the presence of acid causes a racemisation process simply by mixing chiral aza-BH adduct, phosphine and acid.

== Asymmetric aza-BH ==
Aza-BH reactions are known in asymmetric synthesis by making use of chiral ligands. In one study, for the first time, successful use was made of a chiral solvent based on an ionic liquid (IL).

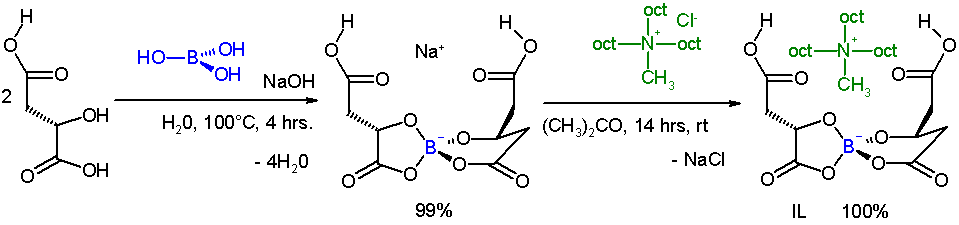

This solvent is a condensation product of L-(−)-malic acid (available from the chiral pool), boric acid catalyzed by sodium hydroxide. When the sodium counter ion is replaced by a bulky ammonium salt the resulting ionic liquid has a melting point of −32 °C.

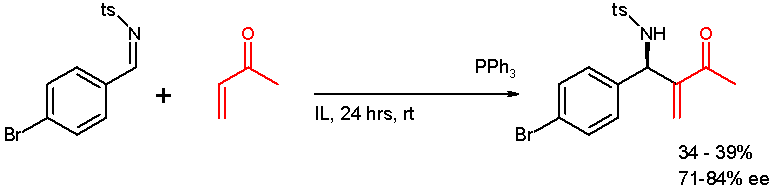

This IL serves as the chiral solvent for the aza-BH reaction between N-(4-bromobenzylidene)-4-toluenesulfonamide and methyl vinyl ketone catalyzed by triphenylphosphine with chemical yield 34–39% and enantiomeric excess 71–84%.
