= 1,1'-Bis(diphenylphosphino)ferrocene =

1,1′-Bis(diphenylphosphino)ferrocene

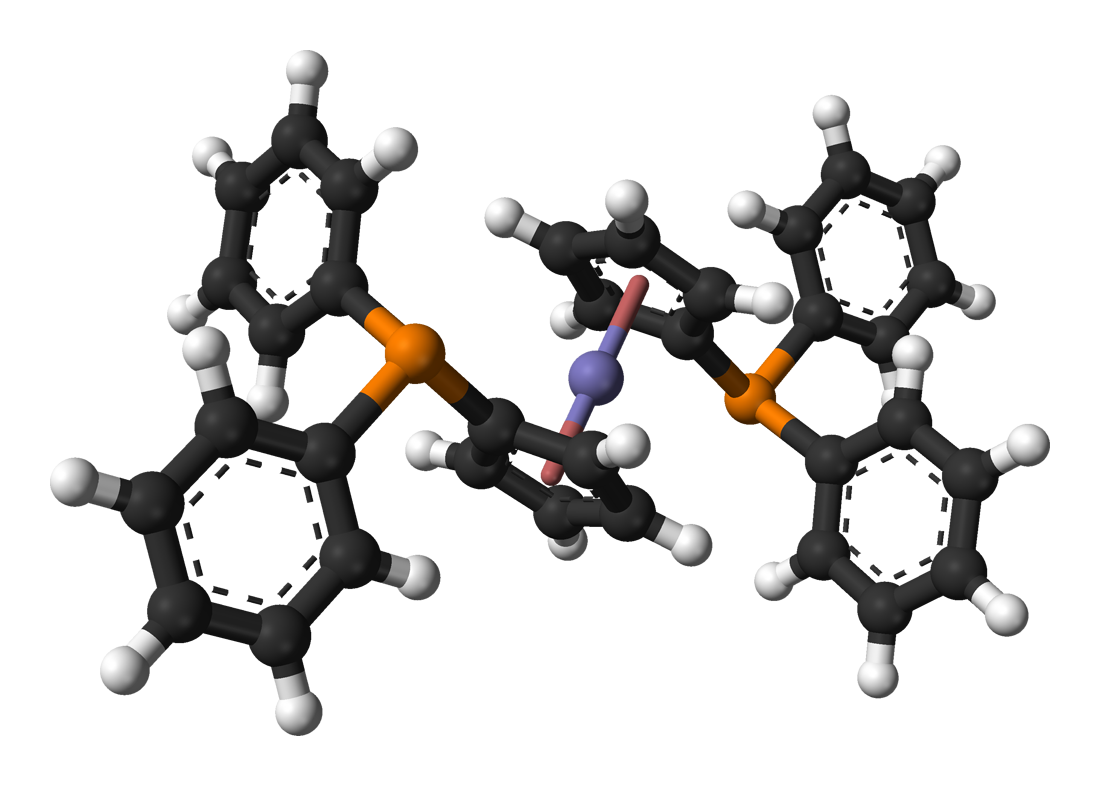

Names
- Preferred IUPAC name (Ferrocene-1,1′-diyl)bis(diphenylphosphane)
- Other names 1,1′-Bis(diphenylphosphino)ferrocene, 1,1′-ferrocenediylbis(diphenylphosphine), Dppf, 1,1′-ferrocenebis(diphenylphosphine), 1,1′-bis(diphenylphosphanyl)ferrocene

Identifiers
CAS Number	12150-46-8
3D model (JSmol)	Interactive image; Interactive image
ChEBI	CHEBI:30743
ChemSpider	21865114
ECHA InfoCard	100.167.773
EC Number	640-119-0
Gmelin Reference	24075
PubChem CID	635956
UNII	L7Z23UWS3H
CompTox Dashboard (EPA)	DTXSID20897535
- InChI: InChI=1S/2C17H14P.Fe/c2*1-3-9-15(10-4-1)18(17-13-7-8-14-17)16-11-5-2-6-12-16;/h2*1-14H; Key: HPXNTHKXCYMIJL-UHFFFAOYSA-N; InChI=1/2C17H14P.Fe/c2*1-3-9-15(10-4-1)18(17- -13-7-8-14-17)16-11-5-2-6-12-16;/h2*1-14H;/q2*-1;+2 Key: HPXNTHKXCYMIJL-UHFFFAOYSA-N; InChI=1/2C17H14P.Fe/c2*1-3-9-15(10-4-1)18(17-13-7-8-14-17)16-11-5-2-6-12-16;/h2*1-14H;/rC34H28FeP2/c1-5-13-21(14-6-1)36(22-15-7-2-8-16-22)33-29-25-26-30(33)35(25,26,29,33)27-28(35)32(35)34(35,31(27)35)37(23-17-9-3-10-18-23)24-19-11-4-12-20-24/h1-20,25-32H Key: HPXNTHKXCYMIJL-KDKHWAOJAX
- SMILES: c1ccc(cc1)P(c2ccccc2)C34C5[Fe]3678912(C5C6C74)C3C8C9C1(C23)P(c1ccccc1)c1ccccc1; C1=CC=C(C=C1)P([C-]2C=CC=C2)C3=CC=CC=C3.C1=CC=C(C=C1)P([C-]2C=CC=C2)C3=CC=CC=C3.[Fe+2]

Properties
Chemical formula	C_{34}H_{28}FeP_{2}
Molar mass	554.391
Melting point	181 to 183 °C (358 to 361 °F; 454 to 456 K)

Hazards
- Occupational safety and health (OHS/OSH)
Main hazards	Toxic
- GHS labelling
Pictograms	(GHS07: Exclamation mark) (GHS08: Health hazard)
Signal word	Warning
Hazard statements	H302, H312, H315, H319, H332
- Except where otherwise noted, data are given for materials in their standard state (at 25 °C [77 °F], 100 kPa). verify (what is ?) Infobox references

1,1′-Bis(diphenylphosphino)ferrocene, commonly abbreviated dppf, is an organophosphorus compound commonly used as a ligand in homogeneous catalysis. It contains a ferrocene moiety in its backbone, and is related to other bridged diphosphines such as 1,2-bis(diphenylphosphino)ethane (dppe).

== Preparation ==
This compound is commercially available. It may be prepared by treating dilithioferrocene with chlorodiphenylphosphine:

Fe(C_{5}H_{4}Li)_{2} + 2 ClPPh_{2} → Fe(C_{5}H_{4}PPh_{2})_{2} + 2 LiCl

The dilithiation of ferrocene is easily achieved with n-butyllithium in the presence of TMEDA. Many related ligands can be made in this way. The Fe center is typically not involved in the behavior of the ligand.

== Reactions ==
Dppf readily forms metal complexes. The palladium derivative, (dppf)PdCl_{2}, which is popular for palladium-catalyzed coupling reactions, is prepared by treating dppf with the acetonitrile or benzonitrile adducts of palladium dichloride: Substitution of the phenyl substituents in dppf leads to derivatives with modified donor-acceptor properties at the phosphorus atoms.

dppf + PdCl_{2}(RCN)_{2} → (dppf)PdCl_{2} + 2 RCN (RCN = acetonitrile or benzonitrile)

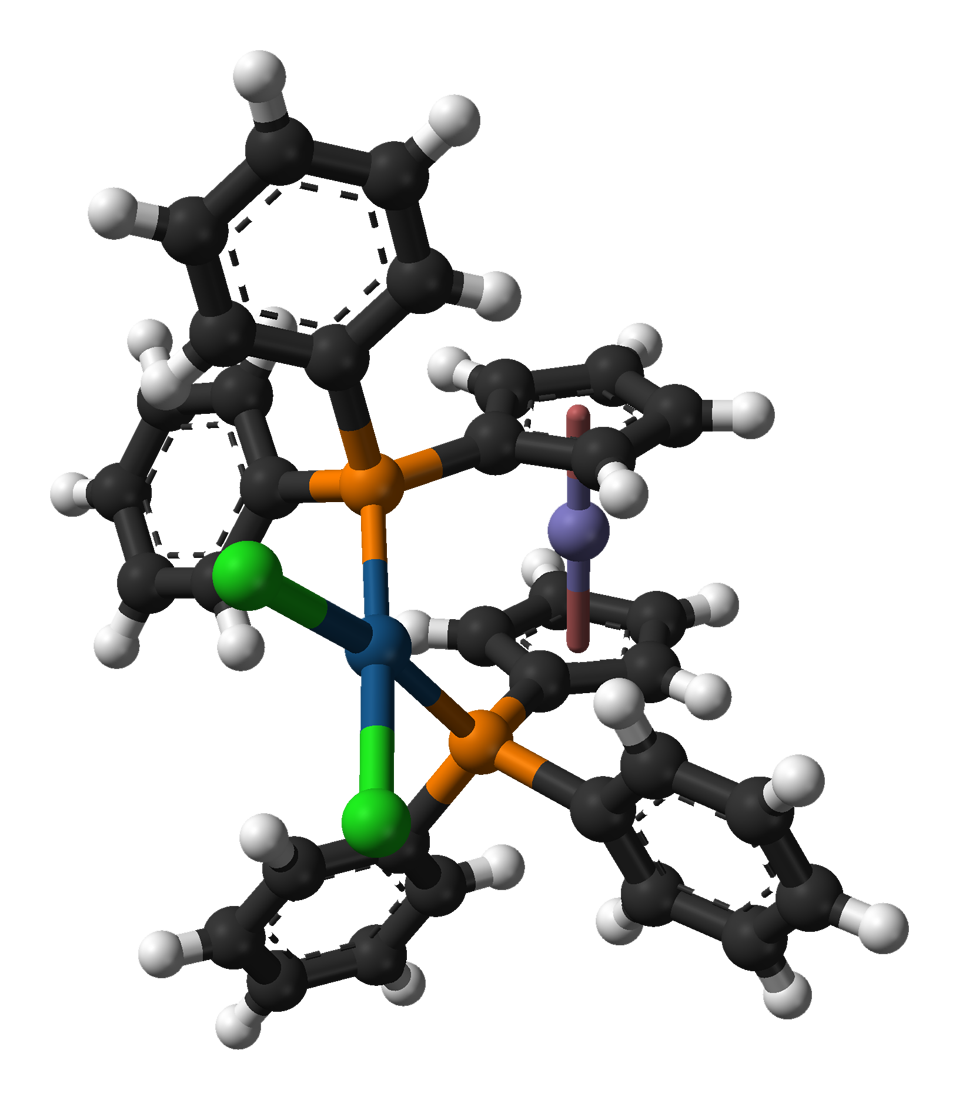
Structure of the complex PtCl_{2}(dppf)

Another example of dppf in homogeneous catalysis is provided by the air- and moisture-stable Ni(II) precatalyst [(dppf)Ni(cinnamyl)Cl. It promotes Suzuki-Miyuara cross-coupling of heteroaryl boronic acids with nitrogen- and sulfur-containing heteroaryl halides.

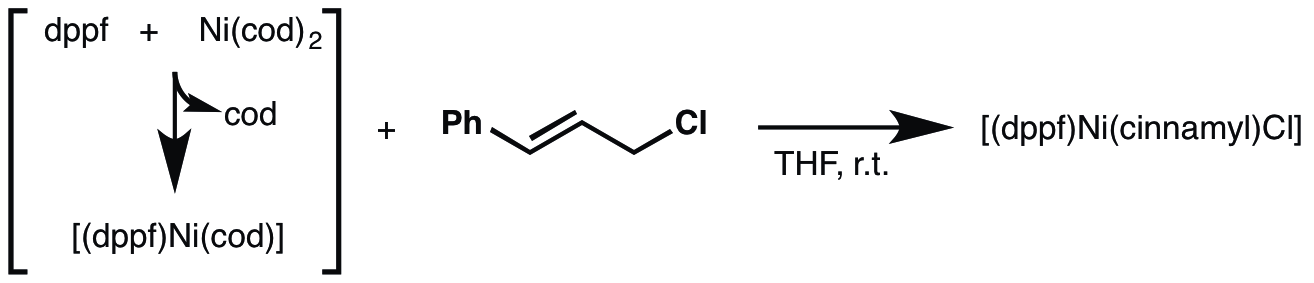
Synthesis of [(dppf)Ni(cinnamyl)Cl)]

Another dppf-based catalyst is (dppf)Ni(o-tolyl)Cl, can be prepared from ligand exchange with (PPh_{3})_{2}Ni(o-tolyl)Cl. It promotes the amination of aryl chlorides, sulfamates, mesylates, and triflates.

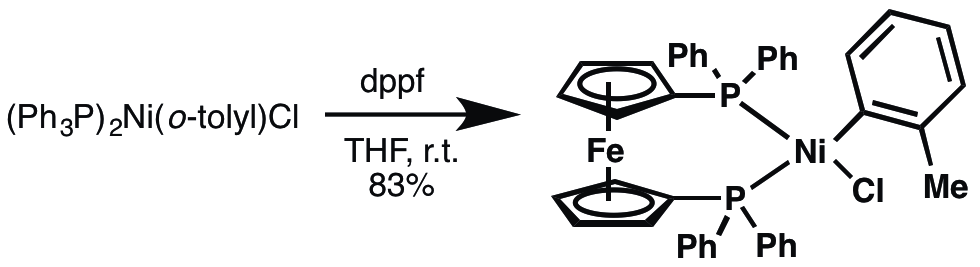
Synthesis of (dppf)Ni(o-tolyl)Cl

== See also ==
- Diphosphines
- borrowing hydrogen catalysis
