= Diglycolic acid =

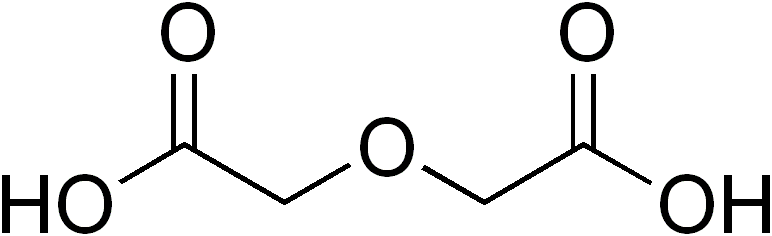

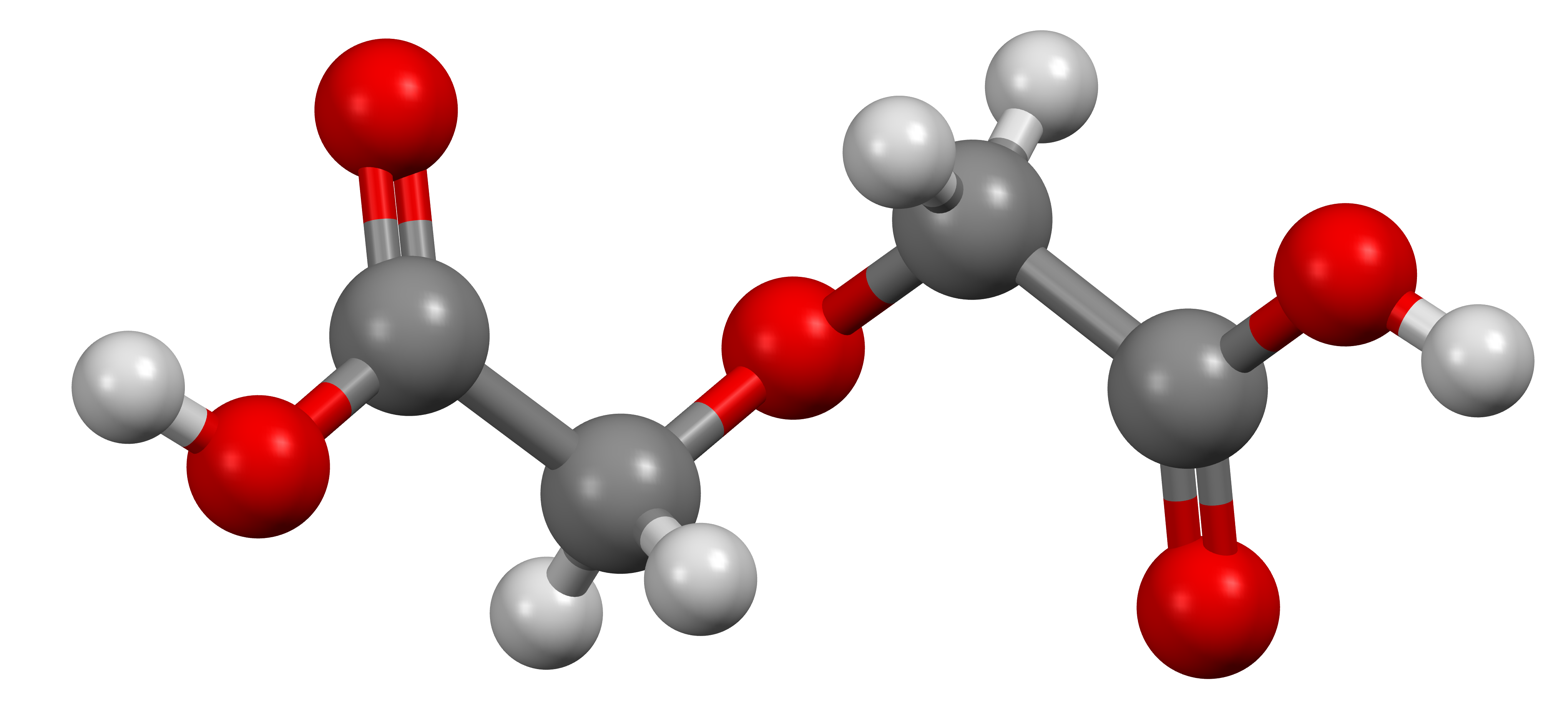

Names
- Preferred IUPAC name 2,2′-Oxydiacetic acid

Identifiers
CAS Number	110-99-6
3D model (JSmol)	Interactive image
ChemSpider	7797
ECHA InfoCard	100.003.476
EC Number	203-823-5
PubChem CID	8088
UNII	S4651635E0
CompTox Dashboard (EPA)	DTXSID4041575
- InChI: InChI=1S/C4H6O5/c5-3(6)1-9-2-4(7)8/h1-2H2,(H,5,6)(H,7,8) Key: QEVGZEDELICMKH-UHFFFAOYSA-N; InChI=1/C4H6O5/c5-3(6)1-9-2-4(7)8/h1-2H2,(H,5,6)(H,7,8) Key: QEVGZEDELICMKH-UHFFFAOYAA
- SMILES: C(C(=O)O)OCC(=O)O

Properties
Chemical formula	C_{4}H_{6}O_{5}
Molar mass	134.09 g/mol
Melting point	140-144°C
Acidity (pK_{a})	2.79, 3.93 (20°C)
- Except where otherwise noted, data are given for materials in their standard state (at 25 °C [77 °F], 100 kPa). verify (what is ?) Infobox references

Diglycolic acid is an aliphatic dicarboxylic acid, its acidity is between the one of acetic acid and oxalic acid. It is formed in the oxidation of diethylene glycol in the body and can lead to severe complications with fatal outcome.

== Preparation ==
Oxidation of diethylene glycol with concentrated nitric acid was described by A. Wurtz in 1861

In parallel, W. Heintz reported the synthesis of diglycolic acid from chloroacetic acid by heating with sodium hydroxide solution.

In a version with barium hydroxide solution as an alkaline medium, diglycolic acid is obtained in 68% yield after acidification.

The yields of the described reactions are unsatisfactory for use on a technical scale.

The single-stage nitric acid process gives even in the presence of an oxidation catalyst (vanadium(V)oxide) yields of only 58-60%. In a multi-stage process of nitric acid oxidation at 70 °C and multiple crystallization steps, evaporation of the residues and return of the diethylene glycol-containing mother liquor, product yields of up to 99% (based on diethylene glycol) can be achieved.

The oxidation of diethylene glycol with air, oxygen or ozone avoids the use of expensive nitric acid and prevents the inevitable formation of nitrous gases. In the presence of a platinum catalyst, yields of 90% can be obtained by air oxidation.

On a bismuth platinum contact catalyst, yields of 95% are to be achieved under optimized reaction conditions.

The oxidation of 1,4-dioxan-2-one (p-dioxanone, a lactone which is used as a comonomer in biodegradable polyesters with nitric acid or dinitrogen tetroxide) is also described with yields of up to 75%.

Diglycolsäuresynthese aus 1,4-Dioxan-2-on

A later modification of the Heintz route was reported in 2024, in which chloroacetic acid was reacted with sodium hydroxide at room temperature in an anhydrous mixture of diethylene glycol diethyl ether and dimethyl sulfoxide. The process afforded sodium diglycolate with high selectivity, while electrodialysis was used for desalination of the post-reaction mixture, concentration of the ionic product and recovery of the organic solvents. In comparison with the conventional aqueous Heintz procedure, the method reduced the formation of glycolic acid as a by-product and avoided heating of the reaction mixture.

== Properties ==
Diglycolic acid is readily water-soluble and crystallizes from water in monoclinic prisms as a white, odorless solid. At an air humidity of more than 72% and 25 °C, the monohydrate is formed. The commercial product is the anhydrous form as free-flowing flakes.

== Application ==
Diesters of diglycolic acid with (branched) higher alcohols can be used as softeners for polyvinyl chloride (PVC) with comparable properties as di-n-octyl phthalate (DOP).

Basic solutions of diglycolic acid are described for the removal of limescale deposits in gas and oil bores, as well as in systems such as heat exchangers or steam boilers.

Diglycolic acid can be used as a diester component in homo- and copolymeric polyesters (so-called polyalkylene diglycolates) which are biocompatible and biodegradable and can be used alone or in blends with aliphatic polyesters as tissue adhesives, cartilage substitutes or as implant materials:

Vernetzte Polyalkylenglycolate
