= Dioxanone =

Dioxanone may refer to:

- Trimethylene carbonate (1,3-dioxan-2-one)
- p-Dioxanone (1,4-dioxan-2-one)
