= (1,1'-Bis(diphenylphosphino)ferrocene)palladium(II) dichloride =

Chemical compound

[1,1'-Bis(diphenylphosphino)ferrocene]palladium(II) dichloride

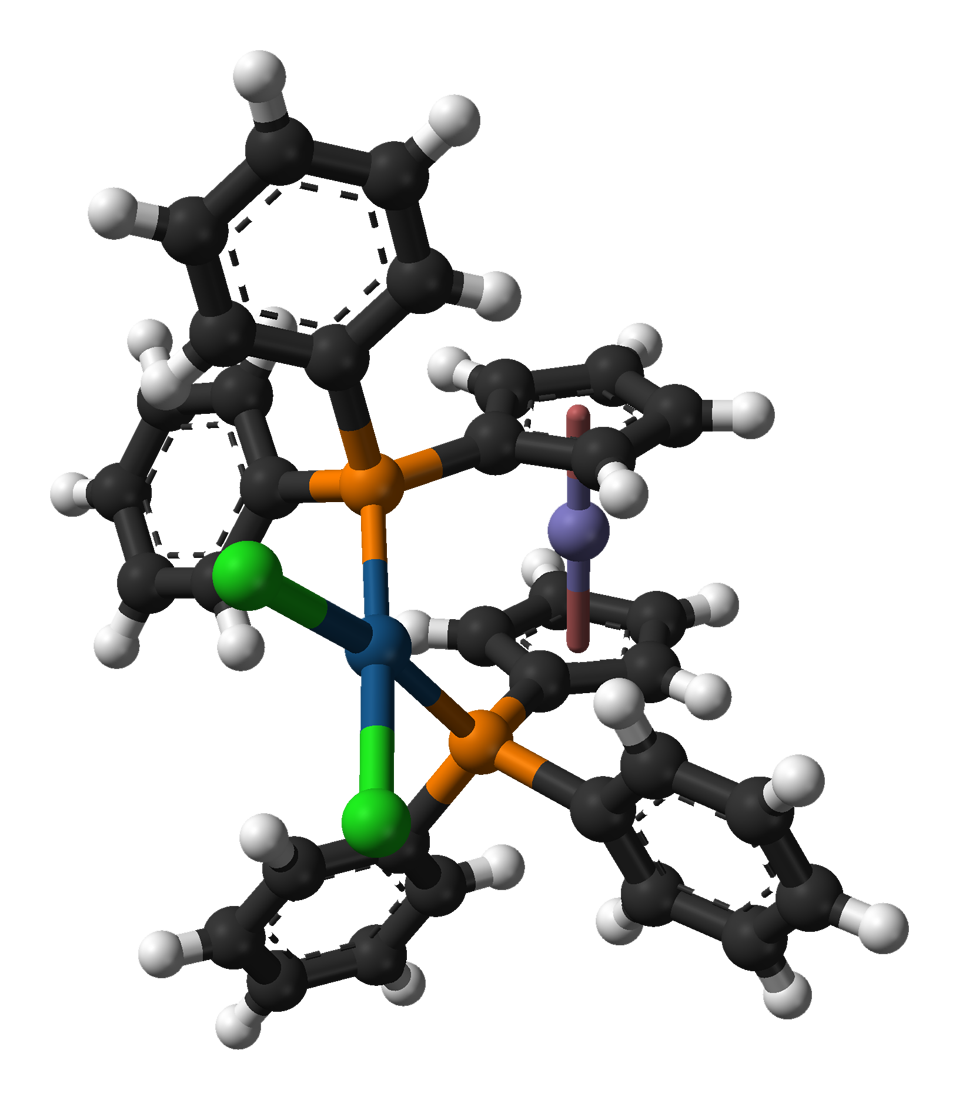

Names
- IUPAC name Dichlorido[(ferrocene-1,1′-diyl)bis(diphenylphosphane-κP)]palladium
- Other names [1,1'-Bis(diphenylphosphino)ferrocene-κ^{2}P,P']dichloropalladium(II)

Identifiers
CAS Number	72287-26-4; 95464-05-4 complex with DCM
3D model (JSmol)	Interactive image
ChemSpider	24602493
ECHA InfoCard	100.106.747
EC Number	615-748-9
PubChem CID	71310626
UNII	SZ5WB9HNQ6
- InChI: InChI=1S/2C17H14P.2ClH.Fe.Pd/c2*1-3-9-15(10-4-1)18(17-13-7-8-14-17)16-11-5-2-6-12-16;;;;/h2*1-14H;2*1H;;/q;;;;;+2/p-2 Key: JCWIWBWXCVGEAN-UHFFFAOYSA-L
- SMILES: [CH-]1C=CC=C1P(C2=CC=CC=C2)C3=CC=CC=C3.[CH-]1C=CC=C1P(C2=CC=CC=C2)C3=CC=CC=C3.Cl[Pd]Cl.[Fe+2]

Properties
Chemical formula	C_{34}H_{28}Cl_{2}FeP_{2}Pd
Molar mass	731.71 g·mol^{−1}
- Except where otherwise noted, data are given for materials in their standard state (at 25 °C [77 °F], 100 kPa). verify (what is ?) Infobox references

[1,1'‑Bis(diphenylphosphino)ferrocene]palladium(II) dichloride is a palladium complex containing the bidentate ligand 1,1'-bis(diphenylphosphino)ferrocene (dppf), abbreviated as [(dppf)PdCl_{2}]. This commercially available material can be prepared by reacting dppf with a suitable nitrile complex of palladium dichloride:

dppf + PdCl_{2}(RCN)_{2} → (dppf)PdCl_{2} + 2 RCN (RCN = CH_{3}CN or C_{6}H_{5}CN)

A mechanochemical approach for the synthesis of this compound has also recently been reported. The method involves the direct use of PdCl_{2} with the exact amount of dppf, obtaining the final complex in 60 minutes.

The compound is popularly used for palladium-catalyzed coupling reactions, such as the Buchwald–Hartwig amination and the reductive homocoupling of aryl halides.

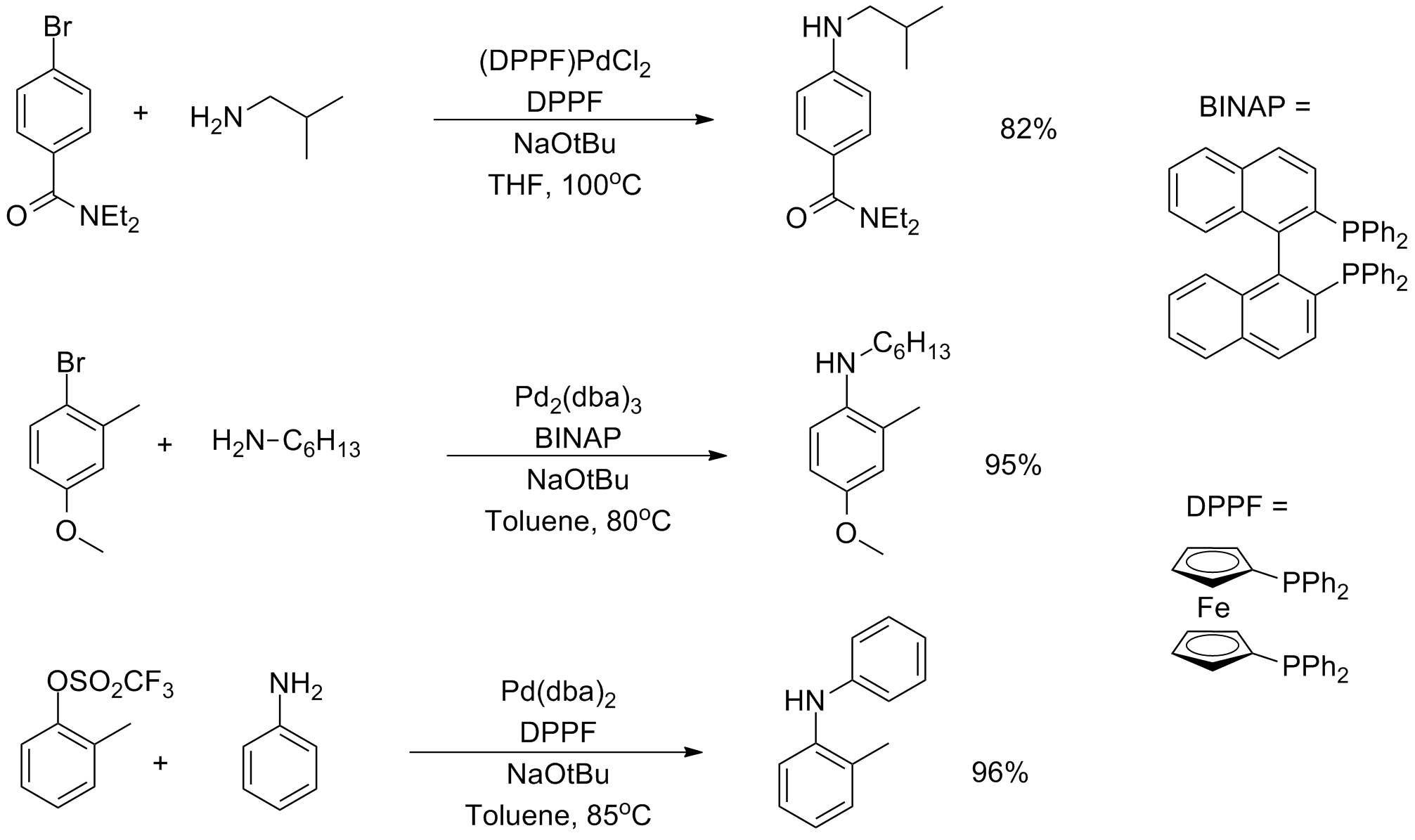
Examples of Buchwald-Hartwig aminations using second generation catalysts including [(dppf)PdCl_{2}]
