= P-Dioxanone =

p-Dioxanone

Names
- Preferred IUPAC name 1,4-Dioxan-2-one
- Other names para-Dioxanone

Identifiers
CAS Number	3041-16-5
3D model (JSmol)	Interactive image
ChemSpider	17222
ECHA InfoCard	100.130.057
PubChem CID	18233
UNII	HLS754O457
CompTox Dashboard (EPA)	DTXSID801336935 DTXSID10951837, DTXSID801336935
- InChI: InChI=1S/C4H6O3/c5-4-3-6-1-2-7-4/h1-3H2 Key: VPVXHAANQNHFSF-UHFFFAOYSA-N; InChI=1S/C4H6O3/c5-4-3-6-1-2-7-4/h1-3H2 Key: VPVXHAANQNHFSF-UHFFFAOYSA-N
- SMILES: C1COC(=O)CO1

Properties
Chemical formula	C_{4}H_{6}O_{3}
Molar mass	102.089 g·mol^{−1}
- Except where otherwise noted, data are given for materials in their standard state (at 25 °C [77 °F], 100 kPa). Infobox references

p-Dioxanone (1,4-dioxan-2-one) is the lactone of 2-(2-hydroxyethoxy)acetic acid. It is a monomer that can undergo ring-opening polymerization to give polydioxanone, a biodegradable implant material. It is isomeric to trimethylene carbonate (1,3-dioxan-2-one).

== Preparation ==
The common synthetic process for p-dioxanone is continuous gas-phase dehydrogenation of diethylene glycol on a copper or copper chromite catalyst at 280 °C.

This gives yields of up to 86%. Removal of excess diethylene glycol is crucial to the stability of the product as a monomer. Further purification with recrystallization, vacuum distillation, or melt crystallization allows purities of >99.5% to be achieved.

== Properties ==
Pure p-dioxanone is a white crystalline solid with a melting point of 28 °C.

== Uses ==
The oxidation of p-dioxanone with nitric acid or dinitrogen tetroxide gives diglycolic acid at 75% yield.

p-Dioxanone can undergo ring-opening polymerization catalyzed by organic compounds of tin, such as tin(II) octoate or dibutyltin dilaurate, or by basic alkoxides such as aluminium isopropoxide. This affords polydioxanone, a biodegradable, semicrystalline and thermally labile polymer with uses in industry and medicine. Depolymerization back to the monomer is triggered at 100 °C.
