= Magnus's green salt =

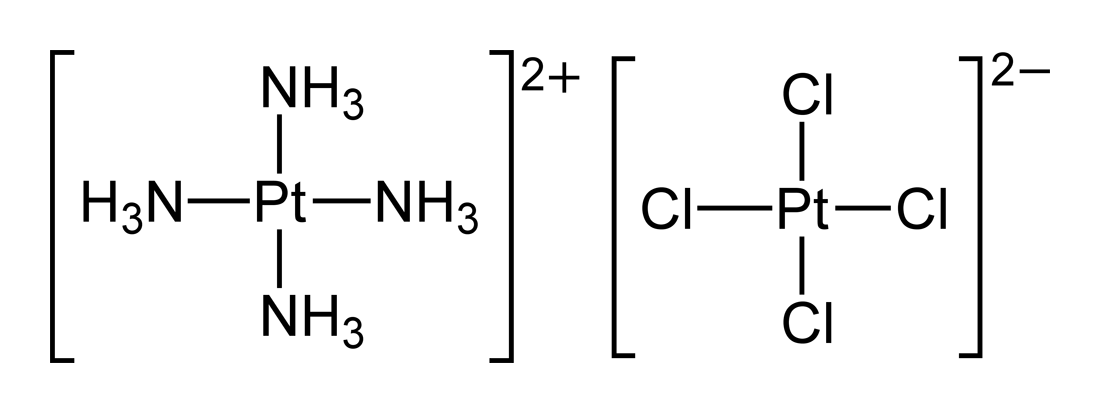

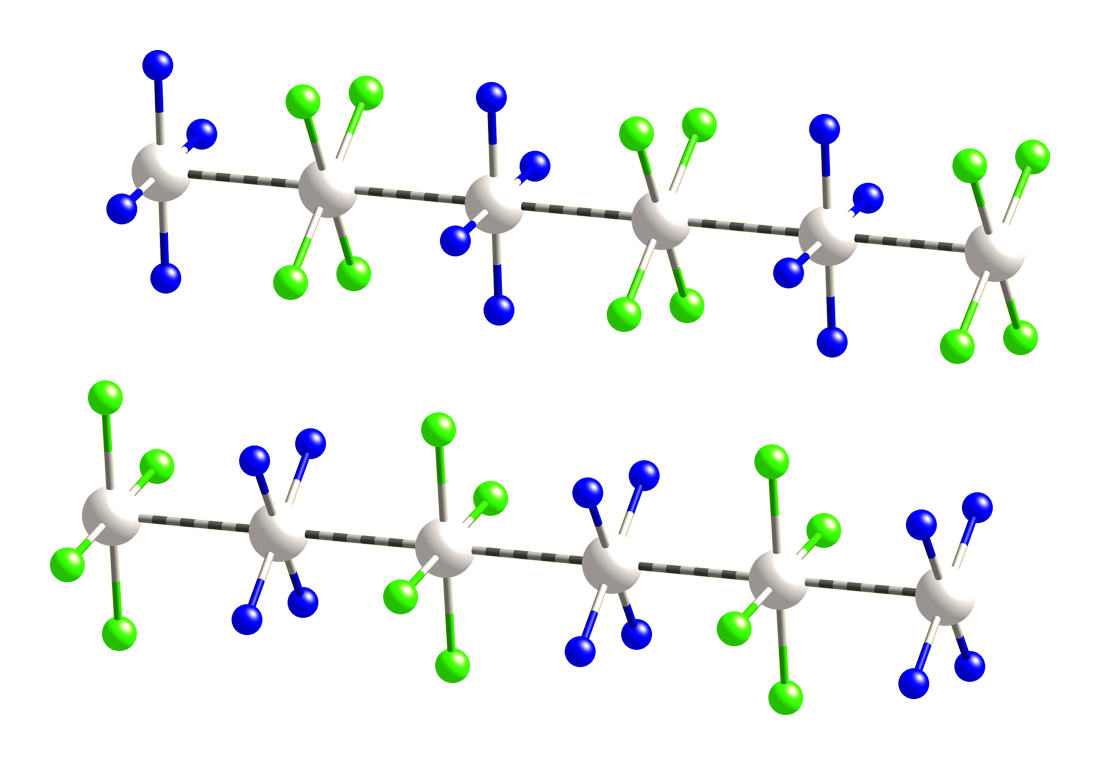

Names
- IUPAC name Tetraammineplatinum(II) tetrachloroplatinate(II)

Identifiers
CAS Number	13820-46-7
3D model (JSmol)	Interactive image
ChemSpider	141440
ECHA InfoCard	100.034.078
EC Number	237-501-0
PubChem CID	16213091
- InChI: InChI=1S/4ClH.4H2N.2Pt/h4*1H;4*1H2;;/q;;;;4*-1;2*+2/p-4 Key: VDZZIFNGBFCNGW-UHFFFAOYSA-J
- SMILES: [NH3+][Pt-2]([NH3+])([NH3+])[NH3+].Cl[Pt-2](Cl)(Cl)Cl

Properties
Chemical formula	[Pt(NH_{3})_{4}][PtCl_{4}]
Molar mass	600.09 g/mol
Appearance	green solid
Density	3.7 g/cm^{3}
Melting point	320 °C (608 °F; 593 K)
- Except where otherwise noted, data are given for materials in their standard state (at 25 °C [77 °F], 100 kPa). verify (what is ?) Infobox references

Magnus's green salt is the inorganic compound with the formula [Pt(NH_{3})_{4}][PtCl_{4}]. This salt is named after Heinrich Gustav Magnus, who, in the early 1830s, first reported the compound. The compound is a linear chain compound, consisting of a chain of platinum atoms.

== Structure ==
This species has attracted interest in materials chemistry and solid-state physics because of its unique green color and one-dimensional linear structure. It contains a chain of alternating [PtCl_{4}]^{2−} anions and [Pt(NH_{3})_{4}]^{2+} cations, in which the platinum atoms are separated by 3.25 Å.

It is also a semiconductor.

== Preparation ==
The compound may be prepared by combining aqueous solutions of [Pt(NH_{3})_{4}]^{2+} and [PtCl_{4}]^{2−}, which gives a deep green solid precipitate. Under some conditions, this reaction affords a pink polymorph of Magnus's green salt. In this so-called "Magnus's pink salt", the square planar Pt complexes are not stacked.

== Related compounds ==
Magnus's green salt is one of three compounds with the empirical formula PtCl_{2}(NH_{3})_{2}, the others being cisplatin (an important anticancer drug) and transplatin. These cis and trans compounds are molecules, whereas Magnus's green salt is a polymer. This difference is manifested by the solubility of the molecular complexes in water, whereas Magnus's green salt is insoluble.

Magnus's green salt occurred as an impurity in early routes to cisplatin from potassium tetrachloroplatinate. Modern production of platinum-based drugs avoids contamination by starting from potassium tetraiodoplatinate, as the iodo ligand's stronger trans effect favors the cis molecule over the polymeric salt.

Soluble analogues of Magnus's green salt can be prepared by replacing the ammonia with ethylhexylamine.

The corresponding palladium compound ([Pd(NH_{3})_{4}][PdCl_{4}]) is known as "Vauquelin’s salt".

== History ==
Magnus's green salt was one of the first examples of a metal ammine complex.
