= Cis-Diamminediiodoplatinum(II) =

cis-Diamminediiodoplatinum(II)

Names
- IUPAC name (SP-4-2)-Diamminediiodoplatinum(II)
- Other names cis-Diiododiammineplatinum, cis-Platinumdiammine diiodide

Identifiers
CAS Number	15978-93-5
3D model (JSmol)	Interactive image
ChemSpider	85296292
ECHA InfoCard	100.036.452
EC Number	240-115-5
PubChem CID	11016356
- InChI: InChI=1S/2HI.2H3N.Pt/h2*1H;2*1H3;/q;;;;+2/p-2 Key: PNCHTLQBARZRSO-UHFFFAOYSA-L
- SMILES: I[Pt@SP1](I)([NH3])[NH3]

Properties
Chemical formula	H_{6}I_{2}N_{2}Pt
Molar mass	482.955 g·mol^{−1}
Appearance	red-orange solid
- Except where otherwise noted, data are given for materials in their standard state (at 25 °C [77 °F], 100 kPa). Infobox references

cis-Diamminediiodoplatinum(II) is a coordination complex of platinum(II) with the formula cis-[PtI_{2}(NH_{3})_{2}]. It is a red solid. Its structure has been confirmed by X-ray crystallography. It is the usual precursor to a popular anticancer drug cisplatin, cis-[PtCl_{2}(NH_{3})_{2}].

== Synthesis ==
Its synthesis entails the reaction of ammonia with potassium tetraiodoplatinate, generated in situ via the reaction of potassium tetrachloroplatinate with potassium iodide:

[PtI_{4}]^{2−} + 2 NH_{3} → cis-[PtI_{2}(NH_{3})_{2}] + 2 I^{−}

In this conversion, the addition of the second ammonia ligand is governed by the trans effect.

A variety of related alkylamine complexes can be prepared similarly.

== Reactions ==
Of commercial interest, cis-[PtI_{2}(NH_{3})_{2}] reacts with aqueous silver nitrate to give the diaquo complex, which subsequently can be converted to cisplatin:

cis-[PtI_{2}(NH_{3})_{2}] + 2 Ag^{+} + 2 H_{2}O → cis-[Pt(H_{2}O)_{2}(NH_{3})_{2}]^{2+} + 2 AgI
cis-[Pt(H_{2}O)_{2}(NH_{3})_{2}]^{2+} + 2 Cl^{−} → cis-[PtCl_{2}(NH_{3})_{2}] + 2 H_{2}O

cis-[PtI_{2}(NH_{3})_{2}] reacts with perchloric acid to undergo deamination, giving the dimeric iodo-bridged complex:

2 cis-[PtI_{2}(NH_{3})_{2}] + 2 HClO_{4} → [Pt_{2}I_{4}(NH_{3})_{2}] + 2 NH_{4}ClO_{4}

This dimeric complex can then be aminated:

[Pt_{2}I_{4}(NH_{3})_{2}] + 2 RNH_{2} → 2 cis-[PtI_{2}(NH_{3})(H_{2}NR)]

Oxidative addition of iodine to cis-[PtI_{2}(NH_{2})_{2}] gives the trans Pt(IV) derivative:

cis-[PtI_{2}(NH_{3})_{2}] + I_{2} → trans-[PtI_{4}(NH_{3})_{2}]
