= Isomer =

Chemical compounds with the same molecular formula but different atomic arrangements

In chemistry, isomers are molecules or polyatomic ions with an identical molecular formula – that is, the same number of atoms of each element – but distinct arrangements of atoms in space. Isomerism refers to the existence or possibility of isomers.

Isomers do not necessarily share similar chemical or physical properties. Two main forms of isomerism are structural (or constitutional) isomerism, in which bonds between the atoms differ; and stereoisomerism (or spatial isomerism), in which the bonds are the same but the relative positions of the atoms differ.

Two broad types of isomers

Isomeric relationships form a hierarchy. Two chemicals might be the same constitutional isomer, but upon deeper analysis be stereoisomers of each other. Two molecules that are the same stereoisomer as each other might be in different conformational forms or be different isotopologues. The depth of analysis depends on the field of study or the chemical and physical properties of interest.

The English word "isomer" (/ˈaɪsəmər/) is a back-formation from "isomeric", which was borrowed through German isomerisch from Swedish isomerisk; which in turn was coined from Greek ἰσόμερoς isómeros, with roots isos = "equal", méros = "part".

== Structural isomers and position isomers ==
Position isomers have same molecular formula and same functional group but differ in the position of the functional group of carbon chain. This phenomenon is known as position isomerism.

=== Example 1:C_{3}H_{8}O ===
propan-1-ol

CH₃–CH₂–CH₂–OH
propan-2-ol

CH₃–CH(OH)–CH₃

The position of the functional group differs. Both isomers have a hydroxyl functional group (–OH), but in different positions.

Structural isomers have the same number of atoms of each element (hence the same molecular formula), but the atoms are connected in distinct ways.

=== Example 2: C_{3}H_{8}O ===
This example shows three distinct compounds with the molecular formula $\ce{C3H8O}$:

Structural isomers of C_{3}H_{8}O: I 1-propanol, II 2-propanol, III ethyl-methyl-ether.

The first two isomers shown are the same as in Example 1: they are propanols, that is, alcohols derived from propane. Both have a chain of three carbon atoms connected by single bonds, with the remaining eight carbon valences being filled by seven hydrogen atoms and by a hydroxyl group $\ce{-OH}$ comprising an oxygen atom bound to a hydrogen atom. These two isomers differ on which carbon the hydroxyl is bound to: either to an extremity of the carbon chain propan-1-ol (1-propanol, n-propyl alcohol, n-propanol; I) or to the middle carbon propan-2-ol (2-propanol, isopropyl alcohol, isopropanol; II). These can be described by the condensed structural formulas $\ce{H3C-CH2-CH2OH}$ and $\ce{H3C-CH(OH)-CH3}$.

The third isomer of $\ce{C3H8O}$ is the ether methoxyethane (ethyl-methyl-ether; III). Unlike the other two, it has the oxygen atom connected to two carbons, and all eight hydrogens bonded directly to carbons. It can be described by the condensed formula $\ce{H3C-CH2-O-CH3}$.

The alcohol "3-propanol" is not another isomer, since the difference between it and 1-propanol is the result of a choice in the direction of numbering the carbons along the chain. For the same reason, "ethoxymethane" is the same molecule as methoxyethane, not another isomer.

1-Propanol and 2-propanol are examples of positional isomers, which differ by the position at which certain features, such as double bonds or functional groups, occur on a "parent" molecule (propane, in this case).

=== Example 3: C_{3}H_{4} ===
There are also three structural isomers of the hydrocarbon $\ce{C3H4}$:

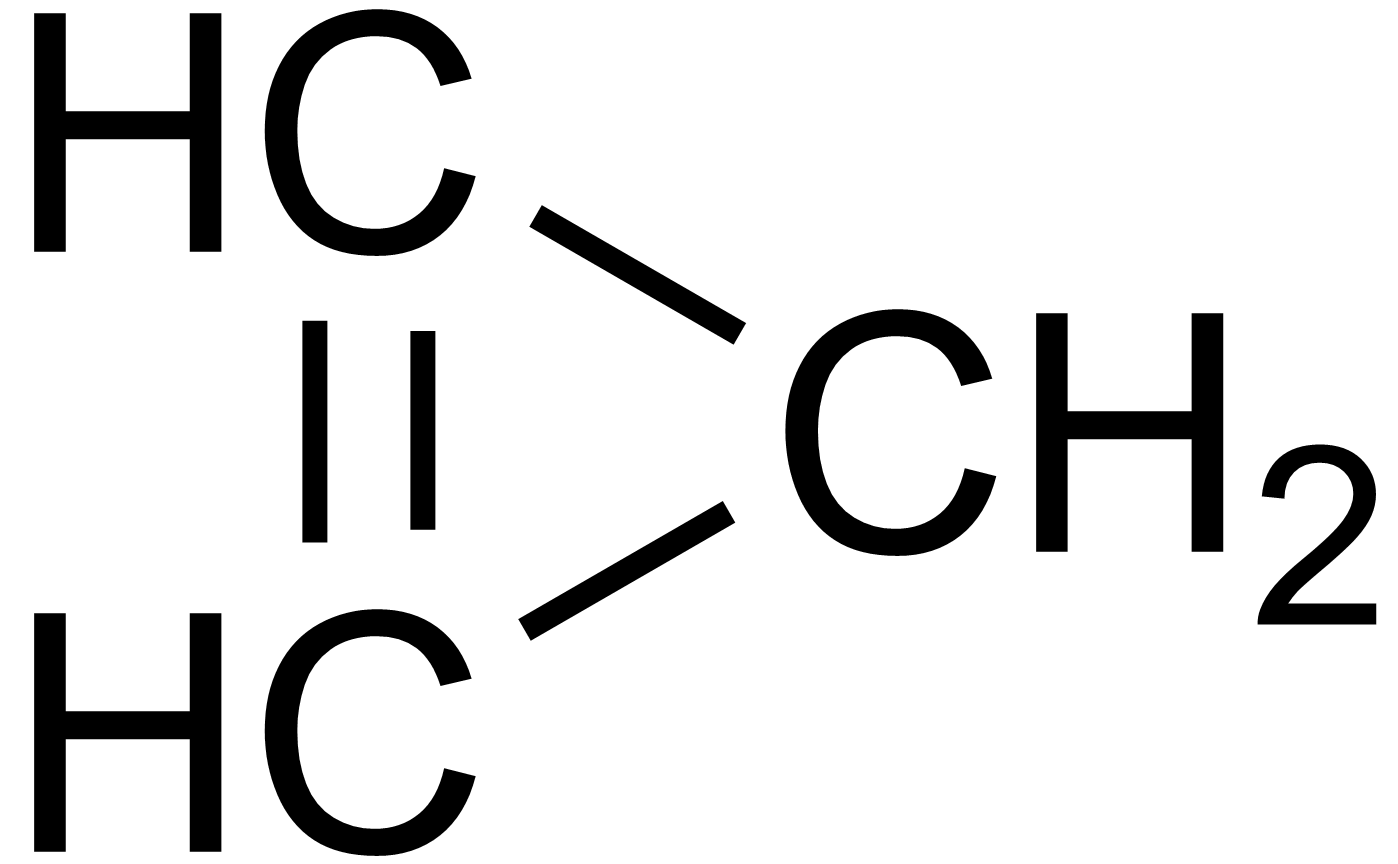
I Propadiene	II Propyne	III Cyclopropene

In two of the isomers (I and II), the three carbon atoms are connected in an open chain, but in one of them (propadiene or allene; I) the carbons are connected by two double bonds, while in the other (propyne or methylacetylene; II) they are connected by a single bond and a triple bond. In the third isomer (cyclopropene; III) the three carbons are connected into a ring by two single bonds and a double bond. In all three, the remaining valences of the carbon atoms are satisfied by the four hydrogens.

Again, note that there is only one structural isomer with a triple bond, because the other possible placement of that bond is just drawing the three carbons in a different order. For the same reason, there is only one cyclopropene, not three.

=== Tautomers ===
Tautomers are structural isomers which readily interconvert, so that two or more species co-exist in equilibrium such as

$\ce{H-X-Y=Z <=> X=Y-Z-H}$.

Important examples are keto-enol tautomerism and the equilibrium between neutral and zwitterionic forms of an amino acid.

== Stereoisomers ==
Two kinds of stereoisomers

Stereoisomers have the same atoms or isotopes connected by bonds of the same type, but differ in the relative positions of those atoms in space. Two broad types of stereoisomers exist, enantiomers and diastereomers. Enantiomers have identical physical properties but diastereomers do not.

=== Enantiomers ===
Two compounds are said to be enantiomers if their molecules are mirror images of each other and cannot be made to coincide only by rotations or translations – like a left hand and a right hand. The two shapes are said to be chiral.

A classic example is bromochlorofluoromethane ($\ce{CHFClBr}$). The two enantiomers can be distinguished, for example, by whether the path $\ce{F->Cl->Br}$ turns clockwise or counterclockwise as seen from the hydrogen atom. In order to change one conformation to the other, at some point those four atoms would have to lie on the same plane – which would require severely straining or breaking their bonds to the carbon atom. The corresponding energy barrier between the two conformations is so high that there is practically no conversion between them at room temperature, and they can be regarded as different configurations.

The compound chlorofluoromethane $\ce{CH2ClF}$, in contrast, is not chiral; the mirror image of its molecule is also obtained by a half-turn about a suitable axis.

(R)-2,3-Pentadiene

Another example of a chiral compound is 2,3-pentadiene $\ce{H3C-CH=C=CH-CH3}$, a hydrocarbon that contains two overlapping double bonds. The double bonds are such that the three middle carbons are in a straight line, while the first three and last three lie on perpendicular planes. The molecule and its mirror image are not superimposable, even though the molecule has an axis of symmetry. The two enantiomers can be distinguished, for example, by the right-hand rule. This type of isomerism is called axial isomerism.

Enantiomers behave identically in chemical reactions, except when reacting with chiral compounds or in the presence of chiral catalysts, such as most enzymes. For this latter reason, the two enantiomers of most chiral compounds usually have markedly different effects and roles in living organisms. In biochemistry and food science, the two enantiomers of a chiral molecule – such as glucose – are usually identified and treated as very different substances.

Each enantiomer of a chiral compound typically rotates the plane of polarized light that passes through it. The rotation has the same magnitude but opposite senses for the two isomers, and can be a useful way of distinguishing and measuring their concentration in a solution. For this reason, enantiomers were formerly called "optical isomers". However, this term is ambiguous and is discouraged by the IUPAC.

Some enantiomer pairs (such as those of trans-cyclooctene) can be interconverted by internal motions that change bond lengths and angles only slightly. Other pairs (such as CHFClBr) cannot be interconverted without breaking bonds, and therefore are different configurations.

=== Diastereomers ===
Stereoisomers that are not enantiomers are called diastereomers. Some diastereomers may contain chiral centers, and some may not.

==== Cis–trans isomerism ====
A double bond between two carbon atoms forces the remaining four bonds (if they are single) to lie on the same plane, perpendicular to the plane of the bond as defined by its π orbital. If the two bonds on each carbon connect to different atoms, two distinct conformations are possible that differ from each other by a twist of 180 degrees of one of the carbons about the double bond.

The classical example is dichloroethene $\ce{C2H2Cl2}$, specifically the structural isomer $\ce{Cl-HC=CH-Cl}$ that has one chlorine bonded to each carbon. It has two conformational isomers, with the two chlorines on the same side or on opposite sides of the double bond's plane. They are traditionally called cis (from Latin meaning "on this side of") and trans ("on the other side of"), respectively, or Z and E in the IUPAC recommended nomenclature. Conversion between these two forms usually requires temporarily breaking bonds (or turning the double bond into a single bond), so the two are considered different configurations of the molecule.

More generally, cis–trans isomerism (formerly called "geometric isomerism") occurs in molecules where the relative orientation of two distinguishable functional groups is restricted by a somewhat rigid framework of other atoms.

For example, in the cyclic alcohol inositol $\ce{(CHOH)6}$ (a six-fold alcohol of cyclohexane), the six-carbon cyclic backbone largely prevents the hydroxyl $\ce{-OH}$ and the hydrogen $\ce{-H}$ on each carbon from switching places. Therefore, one has different configurational isomers depending on whether each hydroxyl is on "this side" or "the other side" of the ring's mean plane. Discounting isomers that are equivalent under rotations, there are nine isomers that differ by this criterion, and behave as different stable substances (two of them being enantiomers of each other). The most common one in nature (myo-inositol) has the hydroxyls on carbons 1, 2, 3 and 5 on the same side of that plane, and can therefore be called cis-1,2,3,5–trans-4,6-cyclohexanehexol. And each of these cis–trans isomers can possibly have stable "chair" or "boat" conformations (although the barriers between these are significantly lower than those between different cis–trans isomers).

The two isomeric complexes, cisplatin and transplatin, are examples of square planar MX_{2}Y_{2} molecules with M = Pt.

Cis and trans isomers also occur in inorganic coordination compounds, such as square planar $\ce{MX2Y2}$ complexes and octahedral $\ce{MX4Y2}$ complexes.

For more complex organic molecules, the cis and trans labels can be ambiguous. In such cases, a more precise labeling scheme is employed based on the Cahn-Ingold-Prelog priority rules.

== Isotopes and spin ==
=== Isotopomers ===
Different isotopes of the same element can be considered as different kinds of atoms when enumerating isomers of a molecule or ion. The replacement of one or more atoms by their isotopes can create multiple structural isomers and/or stereoisomers from a single isomer.

For example, replacing two atoms of common hydrogen ($\ce{^1 H}$) by deuterium ($\ce{^2 H}$, or $\ce{D}$) on an ethane molecule yields two distinct structural isomers, depending on whether the substitutions are both on the same carbon (1,1-dideuteroethane, $\ce{HD2C-CH3}$) or one on each carbon (1,2-dideuteroethane, $\ce{DH2C-CDH2}$); as if the substituent was chlorine instead of deuterium. The two molecules do not interconvert easily and have different properties, such as their microwave spectrum.

Another example would be substituting one atom of deuterium for one of the hydrogens in chlorofluoromethane ($\ce{CH2ClF}$). While the original molecule is not chiral and has a single isomer, the substitution creates a pair of chiral enantiomers of $\ce{CHDClF}$, which could be distinguished (at least in theory) by their optical activity.

When two isomers would be identical if all isotopes of each element were replaced by a single isotope, they are described as isotopomers or isotopic isomers. In the above two examples if all $\ce{D}$ were replaced by $\ce{H}$, the two dideuteroethanes would both become ethane and the two deuterochlorofluoromethanes would both become $\ce{CH2ClF}$.

The concept of isotopomers is different from isotopologs or isotopic homologs, which differ in their isotopic composition. For example, $\ce{C2H5D}$ and $\ce{C2H4D2}$ are isotopologues and not isotopomers, and are therefore not isomers of each other.

=== Spin isomers ===
Another type of isomerism based on nuclear properties is spin isomerism, where molecules differ only in the relative spin magnetic quantum numbers m_{s} of the constituent atomic nuclei. This phenomenon is significant for molecular hydrogen, which can be partially separated into two long-lived states described as spin isomers or nuclear spin isomers: parahydrogen, with the spins of the two nuclei pointing in opposite directions, and orthohydrogen, where the spins point in the same direction.

== Applications ==
Isomers having distinct biological properties are common; for example, the placement of methyl groups. In substituted xanthines, theobromine, found in chocolate, is a vasodilator with some effects in common with caffeine; but, if one of the two methyl groups is moved to a different position on the two-ring core, the isomer is theophylline, which has a variety of effects, including bronchodilation and anti-inflammatory action. Another example of this occurs in the phenethylamine-based stimulant drugs. Phentermine is a non-chiral compound with a weaker effect than that of amphetamine. It is used as an appetite-reducing medication and has mild or no stimulant properties. However, an alternate atomic arrangement gives dextromethamphetamine, which is a stronger stimulant than amphetamine.

In medicinal chemistry and biochemistry, enantiomers are a special concern because they may possess distinct biological activity. Many preparative procedures afford a mixture of equal amounts of both enantiomeric forms. In some cases, the enantiomers are separated by chromatography using chiral stationary phases. They may also be separated through the formation of diastereomeric salts. In other cases, enantioselective synthesis have been developed.

As an inorganic example, cisplatin (see structure above) is an important drug used in cancer chemotherapy, whereas the trans isomer (transplatin) has no useful pharmacological activity.

== History ==
Isomerism was first observed in 1827, when Friedrich Wöhler prepared silver cyanate and discovered that, although its elemental composition of $\ce{AgCNO}$ was identical to silver fulminate (prepared by Justus von Liebig the previous year), its properties were distinct. This finding challenged the prevailing chemical understanding of the time, which held that chemical compounds could be distinct only when their elemental compositions differ. (We now know that the bonding structures of fulminate and cyanate can be approximately described as $\ce{O- -N+}$≡$\ce{C-}$ and $\ce{O=C=N-}$, respectively.)

Additional examples were found in succeeding years, such as Wöhler's 1828 discovery that urea has the same atomic composition ($\ce{CH4N2O}$) as the chemically distinct ammonium cyanate. (Their structures are now known to be $\ce{(H2N-)2C=O}$ and $\ce{[NH+4] [O=C=N^ -]}$, respectively.) In 1830 Jöns Jacob Berzelius introduced the term isomerism to describe the phenomenon.

In 1848, Louis Pasteur observed that tartaric acid crystals came into two kinds of shapes that were mirror images of each other. Separating the crystals by hand, he obtained two version of tartaric acid, each of which would crystallize in only one of the two shapes, and rotated the plane of polarized light to the same degree but in opposite directions. In 1860, Pasteur explicitly hypothesized that the molecules of isomers might have the same composition but different arrangements of their atoms. This property, as regards crystals specifically, is called polymorphism.

== See also ==
- Allotropy (of elements)
- Crystal polymorphism
- Chirality (chemistry)
- Cis–trans isomerism
- Cyclohexane conformation
- Descriptor (chemistry)
- Electromerism
- Isomerization
- Isomery (botany)
- Ligand isomerism
- Nuclear isomer
- Stereocenter
- Structural isomerism
- Tautomer
- Vitamer
