= Bis(triphenylphosphine)palladium chloride =

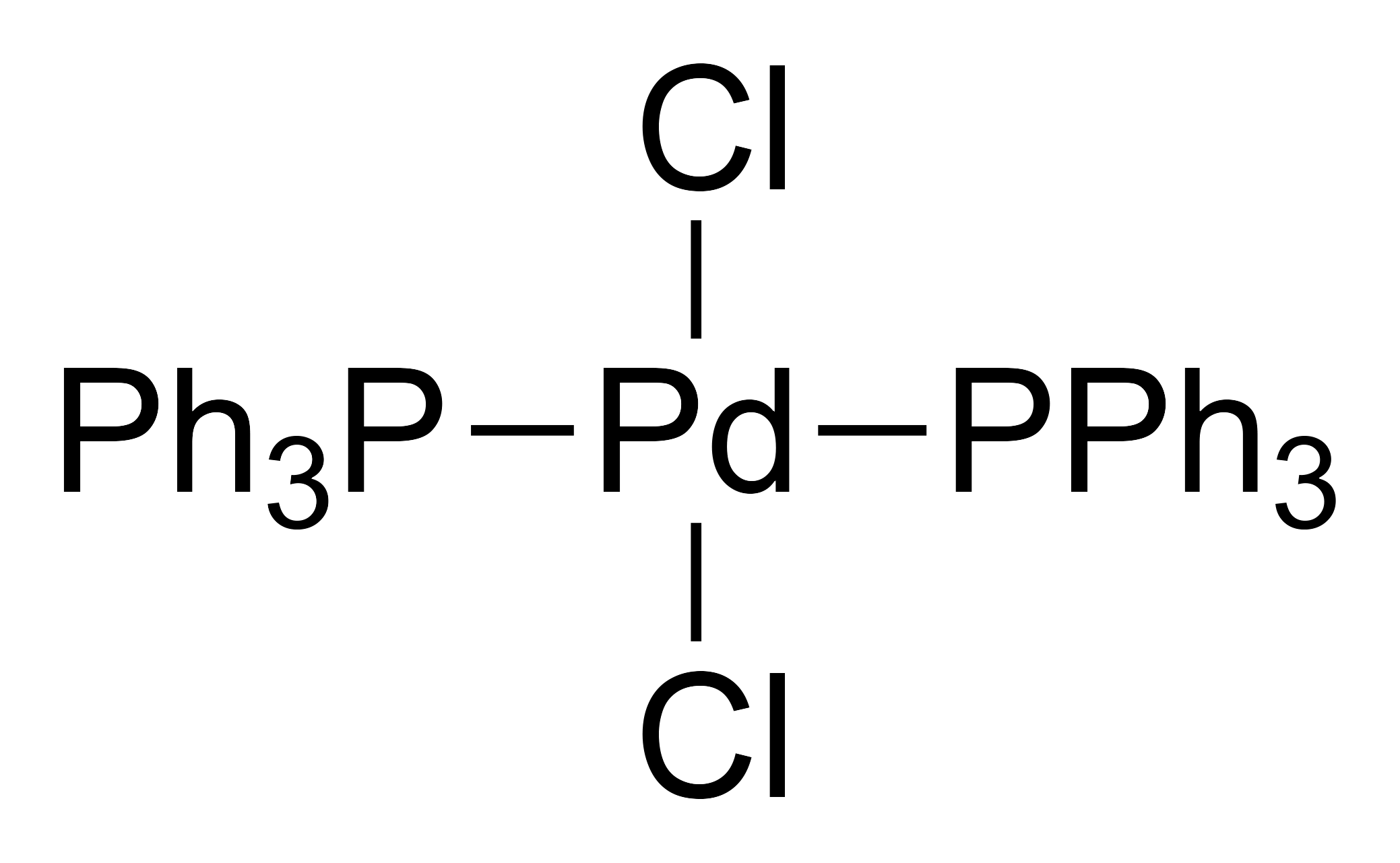

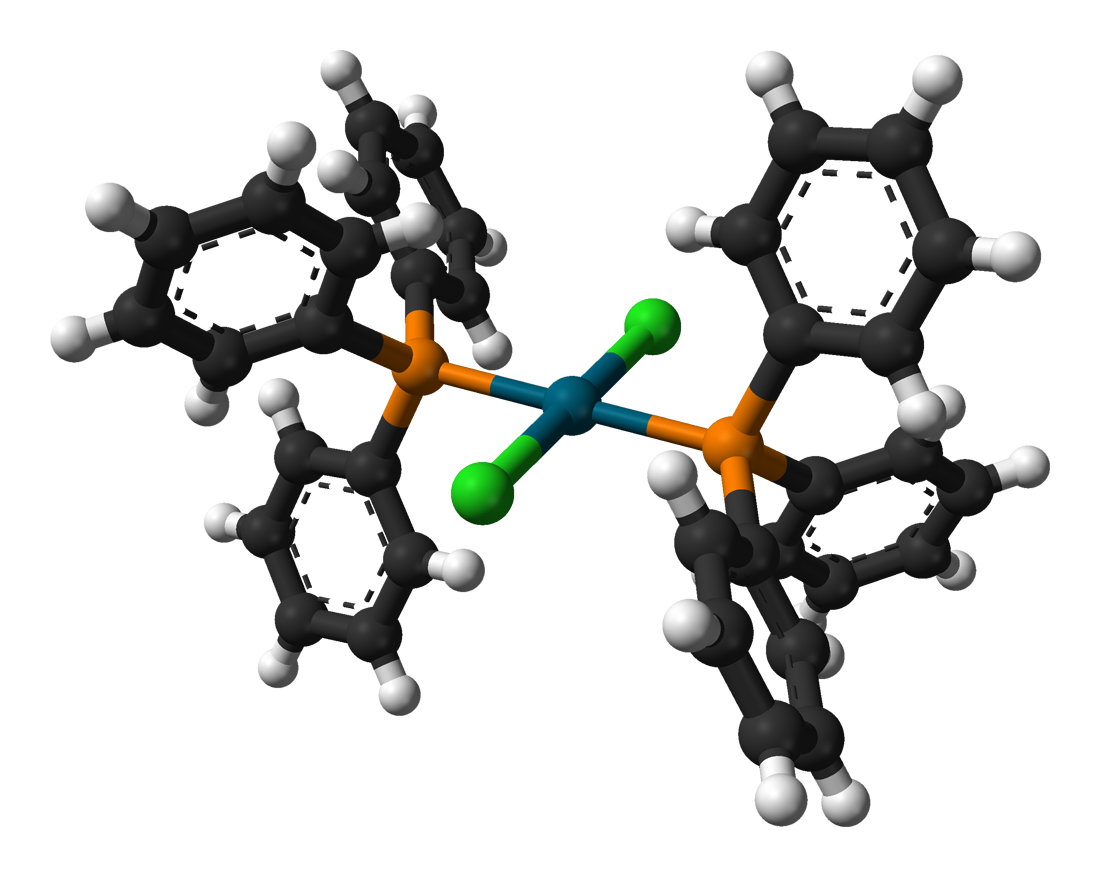

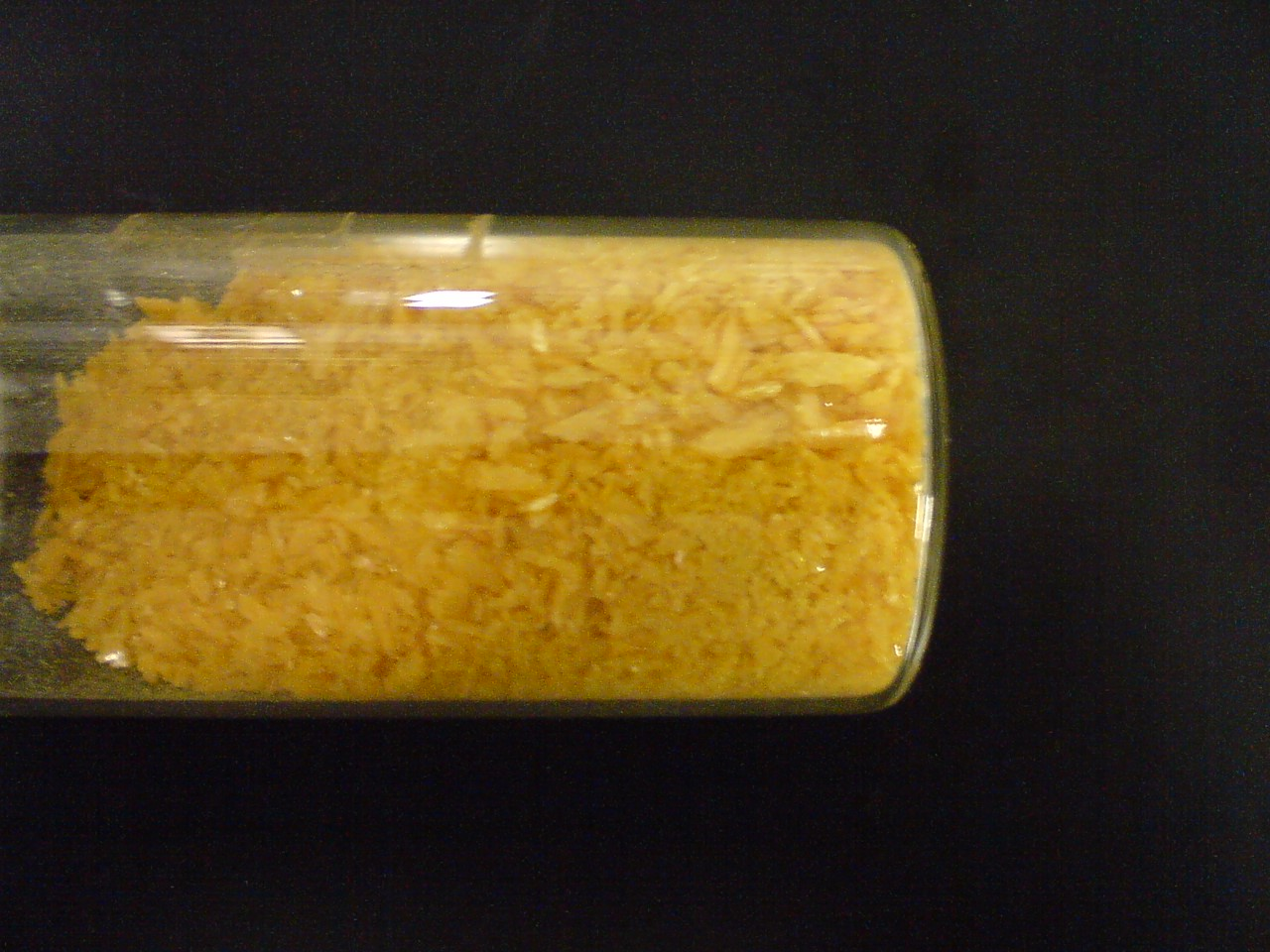

Identifiers
CAS Number	13965-03-2
3D model (JSmol)	ionic form: Interactive image; coordination form: Interactive image
ChemSpider	75895
ECHA InfoCard	100.034.299
PubChem CID	6102075
CompTox Dashboard (EPA)	DTXSID50930525
- InChI: InChI=1S/2C18H15P.2ClH.Pd/c2*1-4-10-16(11-5-1)19(17-12-6-2-7-13-17)18-14-8-3-9-15-18;;;/h2*1-15H;2*1H;/q;;;;+2/p-2 Key: YNHIGQDRGKUECZ-UHFFFAOYSA-L; InChI=1/2C18H15P.2ClH.Pd/c2*1-4-10-16(11-5-1)19(17-12-6-2-7-13-17)18-14-8-3-9-15-18;;;/h2*1-15H;2*1H;/q;;;;+2/p-2 Key: YNHIGQDRGKUECZ-NUQVWONBAO
- SMILES: ionic form: [Pd+2].[Cl-].[Cl-].c3c(P(c1ccccc1)c2ccccc2)cccc3.c1ccccc1P(c2ccccc2)c3ccccc3; coordination form: Cl[Pd-2](Cl)([P+](c0ccccc0)(c0ccccc0)(c0ccccc0))[P+](c0ccccc0)(c0ccccc0)(c0ccccc0)

Properties
Chemical formula	PdCl_{2}(PPh_{3})_{2}
Molar mass	701.90 g·mol^{−1}
Appearance	yellow powder
Melting point	260 °C (decomposed around 300 °C)
Solubility in water	insoluble
Solubility	soluble in chloroform, hexane, toluene, benzene, acetone

Hazards
NFPA 704 (fire diamond)	2 1 0
Flash point	181.7 °C

Related compounds
Related compounds	Bis(triphenylphosphine)platinum chloride
- Except where otherwise noted, data are given for materials in their standard state (at 25 °C [77 °F], 100 kPa). verify (what is ?) Infobox references

Bis(triphenylphosphine)palladium chloride is a coordination compound of palladium containing two triphenylphosphine and two chloride ligands. It is a yellow solid that is soluble in some organic solvents. It is used for palladium-catalyzed coupling reactions, e.g. the Sonogashira–Hagihara reaction. The complex is square planar. Many analogous complexes are known with different phosphine ligands.

== Preparation and reactions ==
This compound may be prepared by treating palladium(II) chloride with triphenylphosphine:

PdCl_{2} + 2 PPh_{3} → PdCl_{2}(PPh_{3})_{2}

Upon reduction with hydrazine in the presence of excess triphenylphosphine, the complex is a precursor to tetrakis(triphenylphosphine)palladium, Pd(PPh_{3})_{4}:

2 PdCl_{2}(PPh_{3})_{2} + 4 PPh_{3} + 5 N_{2}H_{4} → 2 Pd(PPh_{3})_{4} + N_{2} + 4 N_{2}H_{5}^{+}Cl^{−}

A mechanochemical synthesis has been reported.

== Structure ==
Several crystal structures containing PdCl_{2}(PPh_{3})_{2} have been reported. In all of the structures, PdCl_{2}(PPh_{3})_{2} adopts a square planar coordination geometry and the trans isomeric form.

== Applications ==
The complex is used as a pre-catalyst for a variety of coupling reactions.

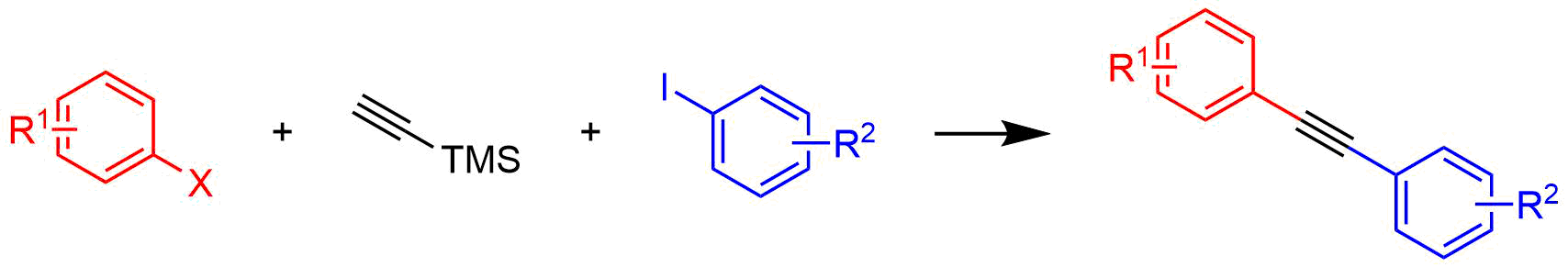
One-pot Procedure for the Synthesis of Unsymmetrical Diarylalkynes.

The Suzuki reaction was once limited by high levels of catalyst and the limited availability of boronic acids. Replacements for halides were also found, increasing the number of coupling partners for the halide or pseudohalide as well. Using bis(triphenylphosphine)palladium chloride as the catalyst, triflates and boronic acids have been coupled on an 80 kilogram scale in good yield. The same catalyst is effective for the Sonogashira coupling.

== See also ==
- Bis(triphenylphosphine)platinum(II) chloride
- Bis(triphenylphosphine)nickel(II) chloride
