= Dichlorobis(triphenylphosphine)nickel(II) =

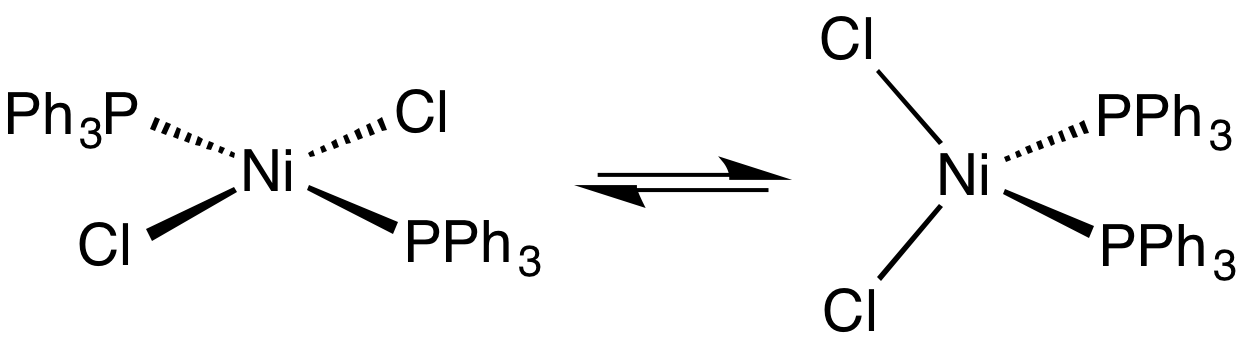

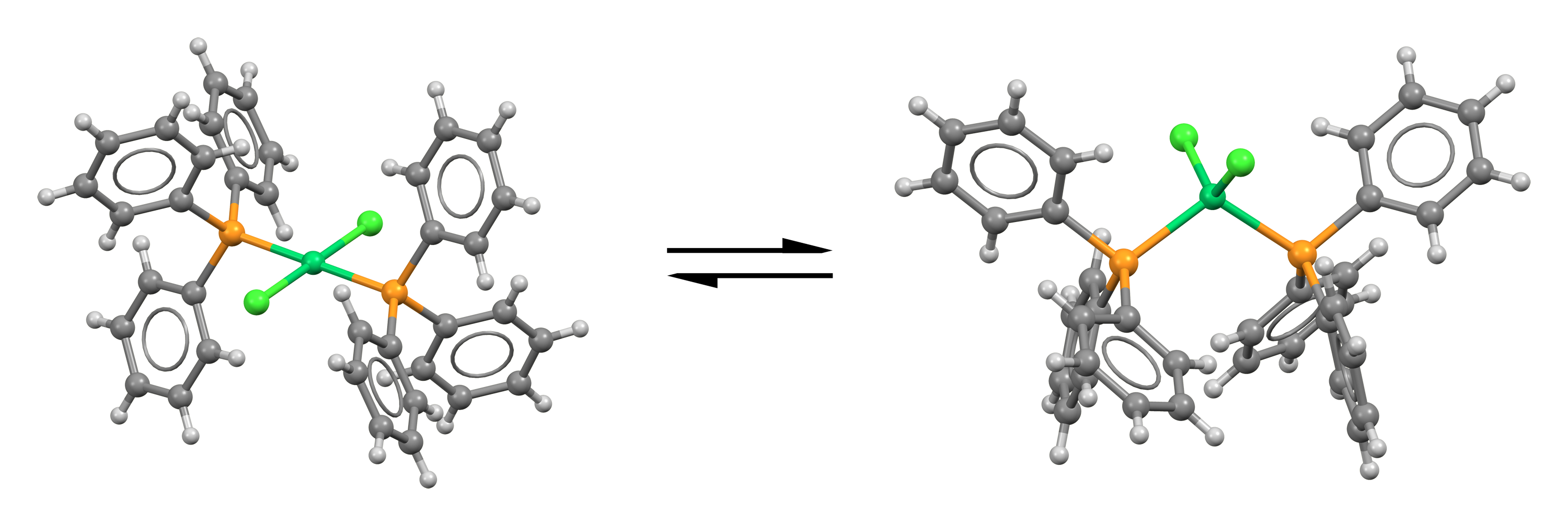

Names
- IUPAC name dichloridobis(triphenylphosphane)nickel(II)
- Other names Bis(triphenylphosphine)nickel(II) dichloride Bis(triphenylphosphine)nickel(II) chloride Dichlorobis(triphenylphosphine)nickel(II); Bis(triphenylphosphine)nickel chloride

Identifiers
CAS Number	39716-73-9 (tetrahedral form); 14264-16-5 (square planar form)
3D model (JSmol)	Interactive image
ChemSpider	76051
EC Number	238-154-8
PubChem CID	498315
- InChI: InChI=1S/2C18H15P.2ClH.Ni/c2*1-4-10-16(11-5-1)19(17-12-6-2-7-13-17)18-14-8-3-9-15-18;;;/h2*1-15H;2*1H;/q;;;;+2/p-2 Key: ZBRJXVVKPBZPAN-UHFFFAOYSA-L
- SMILES: C1=CC=C(C=C1)P(C2=CC=CC=C2)C3=CC=CC=C3.C1=CC=C(C=C1)P(C2=CC=CC=C2)C3=CC=CC=C3.Cl[Ni]Cl

Properties
Chemical formula	C_{36}H_{30}Cl_{2}NiP_{2}
Appearance	purple-blue (tetrahedral) or red (sq. planar)

Hazards
- GHS labelling
Pictograms	(GHS07: Exclamation mark) (GHS08: Health hazard)
Signal word	Danger
Hazard statements	H302, H317, H350, H412
Precautionary statements	P201, P202, P261, P264, P270, P272, P273, P280, P281, P301+P312, P302+P352, P308+P313, P321, P330, P333+P313, P363, P405, P501
- Except where otherwise noted, data are given for materials in their standard state (at 25 °C [77 °F], 100 kPa). Infobox references

Dichlorobis(triphenylphosphine)nickel(II) refers to a pair of metal phosphine complexes with the formula NiCl_{2}[P(C_{6}H_{5})_{3}]_{2}. The compound exists as two isomers, a paramagnetic dark blue solid and a diamagnetic red solid. These complexes function as catalysts for organic synthesis.

== Synthesis and structure ==
The blue isomer is prepared by treating hydrated nickel chloride with triphenylphosphine in alcohols or glacial acetic acid:

NiCl_{2}•6H_{2}O + 2 PPh_{3} → NiCl_{2}(PPh_{3})_{2} + 6 H_{2}O

When allowed to crystallise from chlorinated solvents, the tetrahedral isomer converts to the square planar isomer.

The square planar form is red and diamagnetic. The phosphine ligands are trans with respective Ni-P and Ni-Cl distances of 2.24 and 2.17 Å. The blue form is paramagnetic and features tetrahedral Ni(II) centers. In this isomer, the Ni-P and Ni-Cl distances are elongated at 2.32 and 2.21 Å.

As illustrated by the title complexes, tetrahedral and square planar isomers coexist in solutions of various four-coordinated nickel(II) complexes. Weak field ligands, as judged by the spectrochemical series, favor tetrahedral geometry and strong field ligands favor the square planar isomer. Both weak field (Cl^{−}) and strong field (PPh_{3}) ligands comprise NiCl_{2}(PPh_{3})_{2}, hence this compound is borderline between the two geometries. Steric effects also affect the equilibrium; larger ligands favoring the less crowded tetrahedral geometry.

== Applications ==
The complex was first described by Walter Reppe who popularized its use in alkyne trimerisations and carbonylations. Dichlorobis(triphenylphosphine)nickel(II) is a catalyst in Suzuki reactions, although usually inferior in terms of activity.

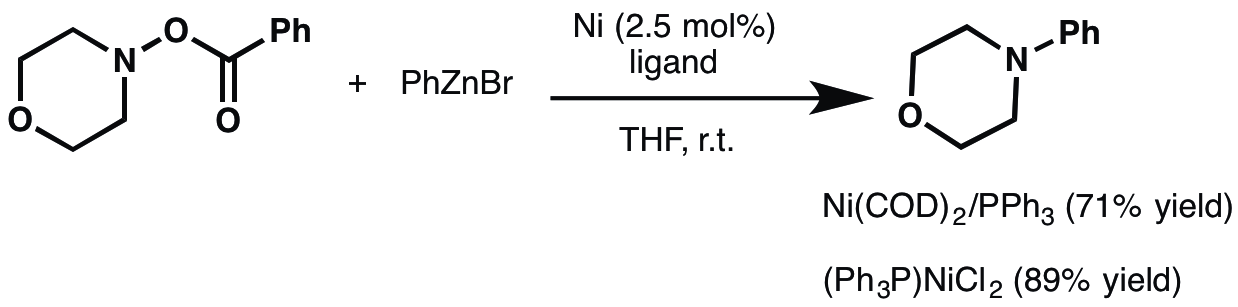
A cross coupling reaction mediated by Ni(cod)_{2} and Ni(PPh_{3})_{2}Cl_{2}.

== See also ==
- Bis(triphenylphosphine)palladium(II) chloride
- Bis(triphenylphosphine)platinum(II) chloride
- Bis(tricyclohexylphosphine)nickel(II) chloride
- Dichloro(1,2-bis(diphenylphosphino)ethane)nickel
