= Bis(triphenylphosphine)platinum chloride =

cis-dichlorbis(triphenylphosphine)platinum(II)
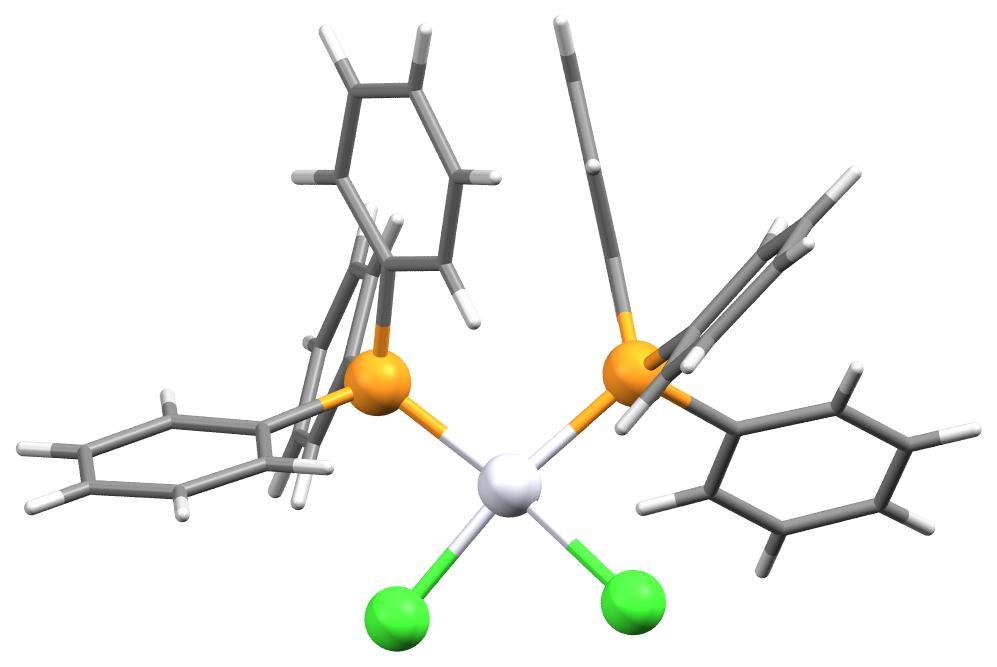

Identifiers
CAS Number	10199-34-5
3D model (JSmol)	ionic form: Interactive image; coordination form: Interactive image
ChemSpider	62779329
EC Number	233-495-9
PubChem CID	6102097
- InChI: InChI=1S/2C18H15P.2ClH.Pt/c2*1-4-10-16(11-5-1)19(17-12-6-2-7-13-17)18-14-8-3-9-15-18;;;/h2*1-15H;2*1H;/q;;;;+2/p-2 Key: XAFJSPPHVXDRIE-UHFFFAOYSA-L
- SMILES: ionic form: C1=CC=C(C=C1)P(C2=CC=CC=C2)C3=CC=CC=C3.C1=CC=C(C=C1)P(C2=CC=CC=C2)C3=CC=CC=C3.Cl[Pt]Cl; coordination form: Cl[Pt-2](Cl)([P+](c0ccccc0)(c0ccccc0)(c0ccccc0))[P+](c0ccccc0)(c0ccccc0)(c0ccccc0)

Properties
Chemical formula	C_{36}H_{30}Cl_{2}P_{2}Pt
Molar mass	790.57 g·mol^{−1}
Appearance	white solid

Hazards
- GHS labelling
Pictograms	(GHS07: Exclamation mark)
Signal word	Warning
Hazard statements	H315, H319, H335
Precautionary statements	P261, P264, P271, P280, P302+P352, P304+P340, P305+P351+P338, P312, P321, P332+P313, P337+P313, P362, P403+P233, P405, P501
- Except where otherwise noted, data are given for materials in their standard state (at 25 °C [77 °F], 100 kPa). Infobox references

trans-dichlorbis(triphenylphosphine)platinum(II)
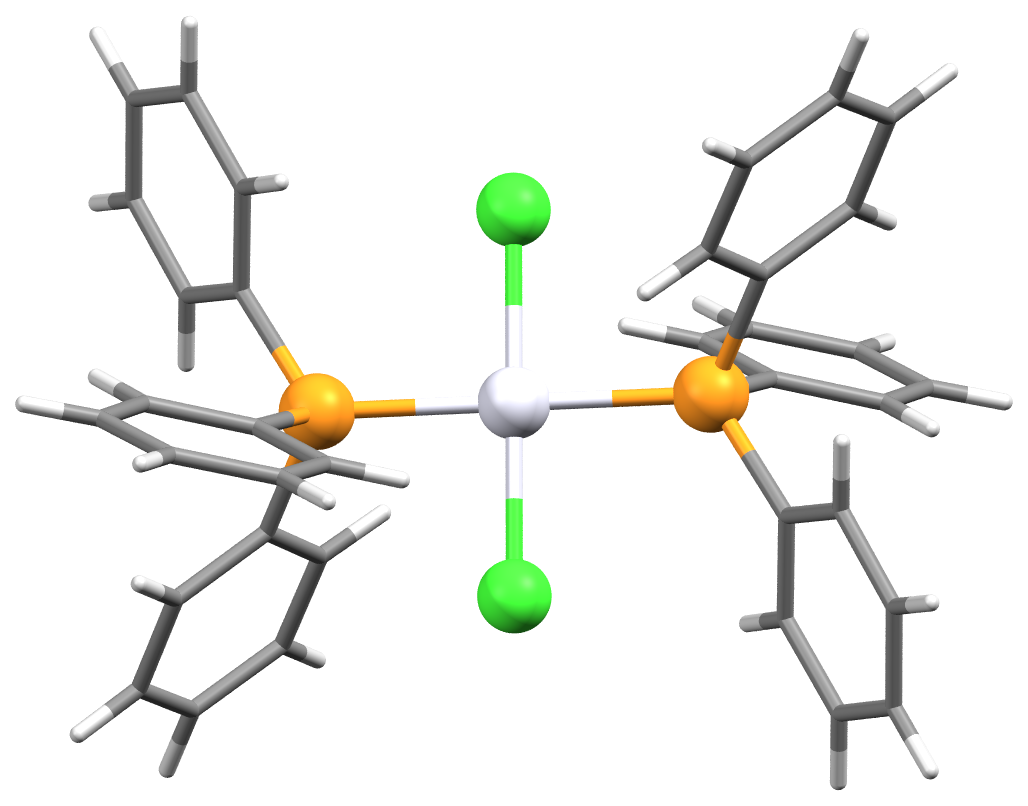

Identifiers
CAS Number	14056-88-3

Properties
Chemical formula	C_{36}H_{30}Cl_{2}P_{2}Pt
Molar mass	790.57 g·mol^{−1}
Appearance	yellow solid
- Except where otherwise noted, data are given for materials in their standard state (at 25 °C [77 °F], 100 kPa). Infobox references

Bis(triphenylphosphine)platinum chloride is a metal phosphine complex with the formula PtCl_{2}[P(C_{6}H_{5})_{3}]_{2}. Cis- and trans isomers are known. The cis isomer is a white crystalline powder, while the trans isomer is yellow. Both isomers are square planar about the central platinum atom. The cis isomer is used primarily as a reagent for the synthesis of other platinum compounds.

== Preparation ==
The cis isomer is the prepared by heating solutions of platinum(II) chlorides with triphenylphosphine. For example, starting from potassium tetrachloroplatinate:

K_{2}PtCl_{4} + 2 PPh_{3} → cis-Pt(PPh_{3})_{2}Cl_{2} + 2 KCl

The trans isomer is the prepared by treating potassium trichloro(ethylene)platinate(II) (Zeise's salt) with triphenylphosphine:

KPt(C_{2}H_{4})Cl_{3} + 2 PPh_{3} → trans-Pt(PPh_{3})_{2}Cl_{2} + KCl + C_{2}H_{4}

With heating or in the presence of excess PPh_{3}, the trans isomer converts to the cis complex. The latter complex is the thermodynamic product due to triphenylphosphine being a strong trans effect ligand.

In cis-bis(triphenylphosphine)platinum chloride, the average Pt-P has a bond distance of 2.261 Å and the average Pt-Cl has a bond distance of 2.346 Å. In trans-bis(triphenylphosphine)platinum chloride, the Pt-P distance is 2.316 Å and the Pt-Cl distance is 2.300 Å.

The complex also undergoes photoisomerization.

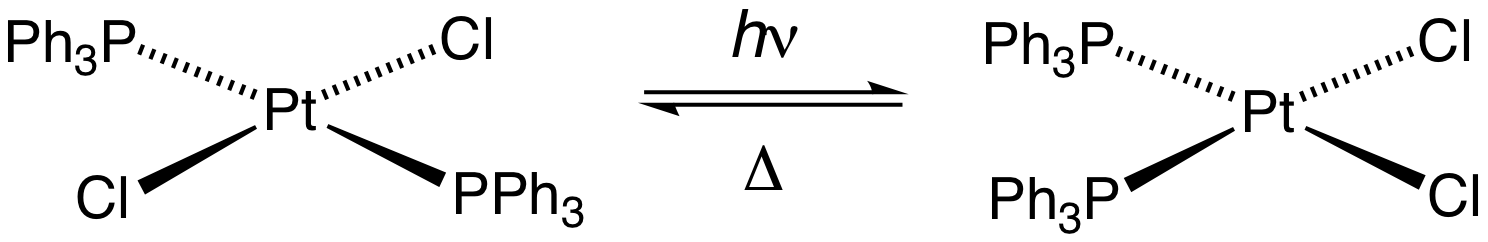

== See also ==
- Bis(triphenylphosphine)palladium(II) chloride
- Bis(triphenylphosphine)nickel(II) chloride
