= Platinum(II) iodide =

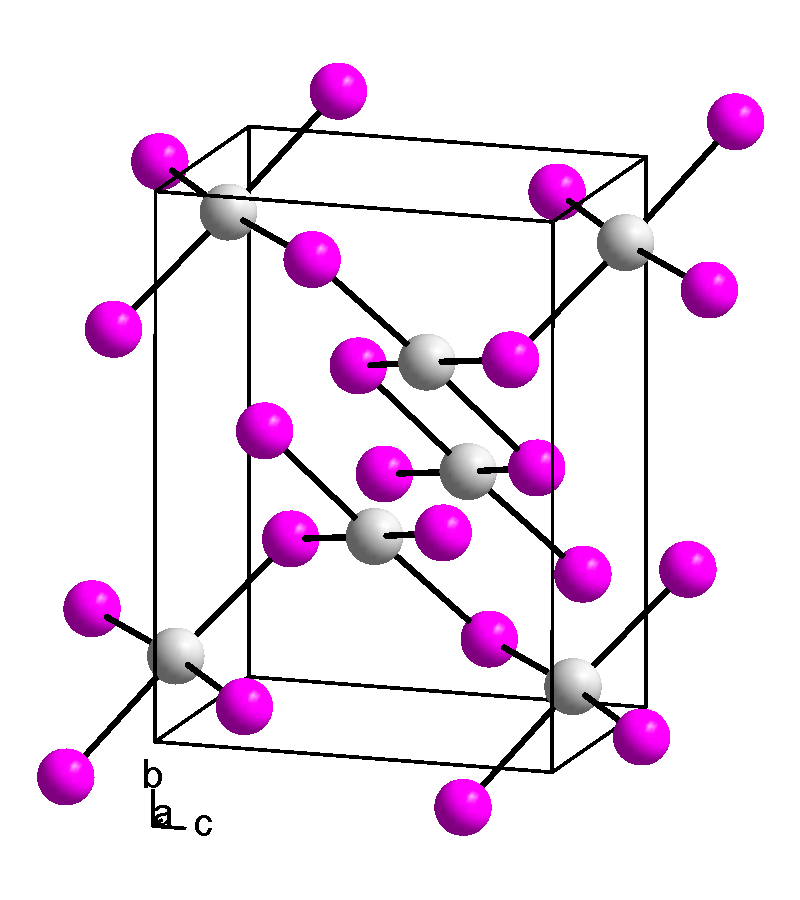
- beta-PtI_{2} (at room temperature)

Names
- IUPAC name diiodoplatinum
- Other names Platinum diiodide, platinum(2+) diiodide

Identifiers
CAS Number	7790-39-8
3D model (JSmol)	Interactive image
ChemSpider	74229
ECHA InfoCard	100.029.277
EC Number	232-204-2
PubChem CID	82252
UNII	SMK137T046
CompTox Dashboard (EPA)	50999091
- InChI: InChI=1S/2HI.Pt/h2*1H;/q;;+2/p-2 Key: ZXDJCKVQKCNWEI-UHFFFAOYSA-L
- SMILES: [Pt+2].[I-].[I-]

Properties
Chemical formula	I_{2}Pt
Molar mass	448.893 g·mol^{−1}
Appearance	black crystals
Density	6.403 g/cm^{3}
Melting point	325 °C (617 °F; 598 K) (decomposes)
Solubility in water	insoluble
Solubility	soluble in ethylamine and hydrogen iodide insoluble in ethanol, acetone, and ether

Structure
Crystal structure	monoclinic (β-form)
Space group	P2_{1}/c (No. 14)
Lattice constant	a = 658.77 pm, b = 871.50 pm, c = 688.94 pm α = 90°, β = 102.76°, γ = 90°
Formula units (Z)	4 units per cell

Hazards
- GHS labelling
Pictograms	(GHS07: Exclamation mark)
Signal word	Warning
Hazard statements	H315, H317, H319, H335
Precautionary statements	P261, P264, P264+P265, P271, P272, P280, P302+P352, P304+P340, P305+P351+P338, P319, P321, P333+P317, P337+P317, P362+P364, P403+P233, P405, P501
- Except where otherwise noted, data are given for materials in their standard state (at 25 °C [77 °F], 100 kPa). Infobox references

Platinum(II) iodide is a binary inorganic compound of platinum and iodine with the chemical formula PtI_{2}.

== Structure ==
Platinum(II) iodide exhibits polymorphism. A cubic α-form (a = 1109 pm) and monoclinic β-form have been characterized.

== Synthesis ==
Platinum(II) iodide can be produced by heating platinum(II) chloride with potassium iodide:

PtCl_{2} + 2KI → PtI_{2} + 2KCl

The α-form is obtained by thermal decomposition of PtI_{4} in a closed ampoule at an I_{2} pressure of 8 bar at 430 °C.

The β-form can be prepared by hydrothermal synthesis from PtI_{4}, KI, and I_{2} at 420 °C.

== Related compounds ==
Potassium tetraiodoplatinate (K_{2}PtI_{4}) is a soluble derivative of PtI_{2}.
