= Ilya Chernyaev =

Soviet chemist (1893-1966)

Ilya Ilich Chernyaev (21 January 1893 – 30 September 1966) was a Russian and Soviet chemist who worked on inorganic chemistry and identified what is termed in coordination chemistry as the trans effect. He was a specialist on the refining of rhodium, palladium, platinum and other precious metals.

Chernyaev was born in Spasskoye in a farming family. After studying at the Vologda gymnasium and passing with a gold medal in 1911 he joined St Petersburg University where he became a student of Lev Aleksandrovich Chugaev and graduated in 1915. After 1917 he worked under the Commission for the Study of Russian Natural Productive Sources, studying industrial chemistry and dealt with the processing of precious metals. He studied the chemistry of platinum compounds and is credited with the term "trans effect" that he coined in 1926. He noted that in square planar complexes of platinum, specific ligand groups directed the formation of cis or trans compounds in reactions. Platinum compounds are known for showing different colours according to the stereochemistry. He postulated that electronegative ligands led to directing of complexing of a new radical at the trans position in reactions. He became a professor of inorganic chemistry at Leningrad University in 1932. He published more than 275 papers.

== Awards ==
- Two Stalin Prizes first degree (1949, 1952)
- Two Stalin Prizes second degree (1946, 1951)
- Orders and medals
