= Barnett Rosenberg =

American chemist (1926–2009)

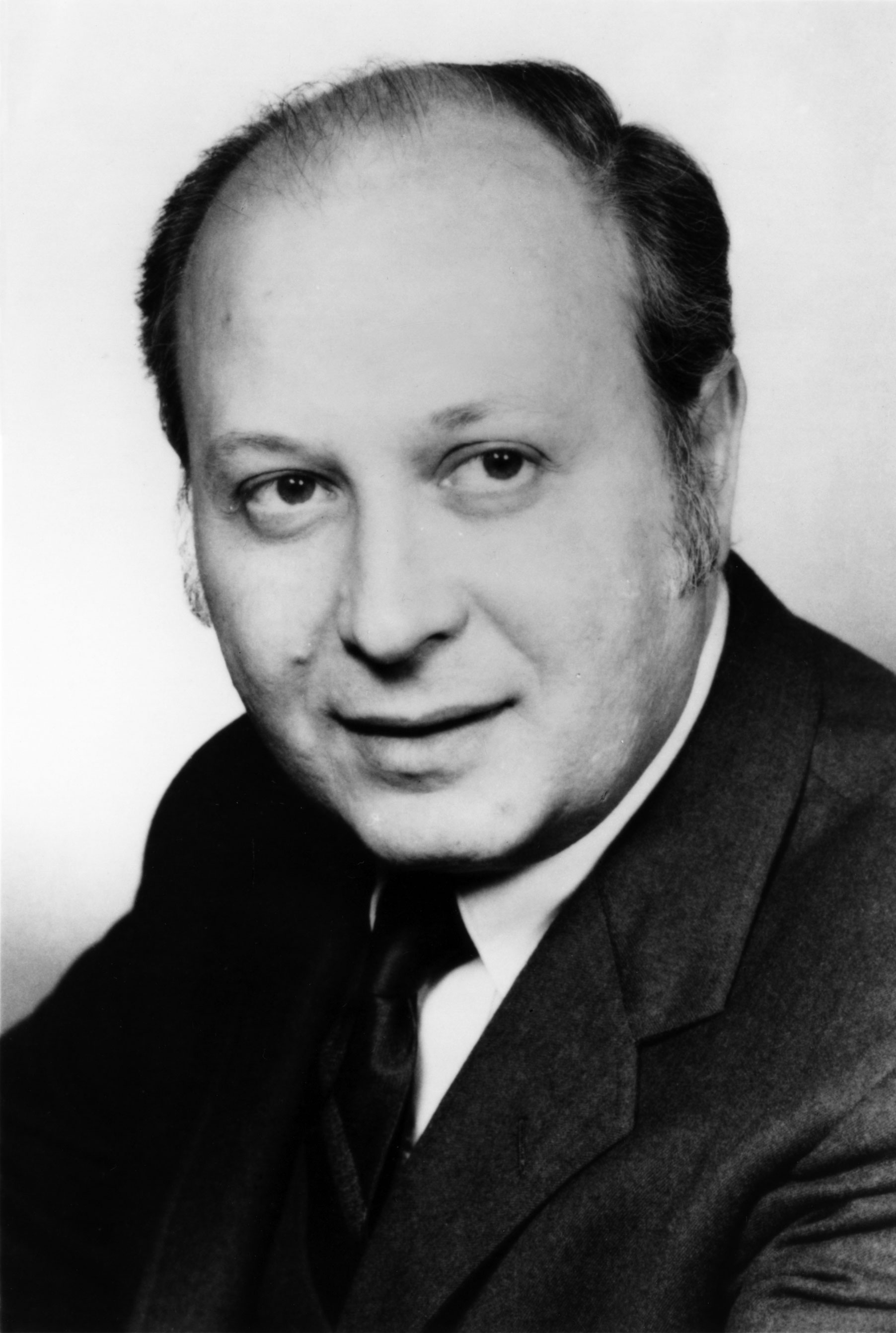
- Born: November 16, 1926; New York, New York, U.S.
- Died: August 8, 2009 (aged 82); Lansing, Michigan, U.S.
- Known for: Cisplatin
- Children: 2, including Tina Rosenberg
- Scientific career
- Fields: Physics/biophysics
- Workplaces: Michigan State University

Barnett Rosenberg (16 November 1926 – 8 August 2009) was an American chemist best known for the discovery of the anti-cancer drug cisplatin.

Rosenberg graduated from Brooklyn College in 1948 and obtained his PhD in physics at New York University (NYU) in 1956. He joined Michigan State University as a professor of biophysics in 1961 and worked there until 1997.

In 1965, Rosenberg and his colleagues proved that certain platinum-containing compounds inhibited cell division and then in 1969 showed that they cured solid tumors. The chemotherapy drug that eventually resulted from this work, cisplatin, obtained US Food and Drug Administration (FDA) approval in 1978 and went on to become a widely used anti-cancer drug. The initial discovery was quite serendipitous. Rosenberg was looking into the effects of an electric field on the growth of bacteria. He noticed that bacteria ceased to divide when placed in an electric field and eventually traced the cause of this phenomenon to the platinum electrode he was using.

He was awarded the Chemical Pioneer Award from the American Institute of Chemists in 1979, the Charles F. Kettering Prize in 1984 and the Harvey Prize in 1984.
