= Trans effect =

In chemistry, tendency of trans ligands to change into other ligands

In inorganic chemistry, the trans effect is the increased lability of ligands that are trans to certain other ligands, which can thus be regarded as trans-directing ligands. It is attributed to electronic effects and it is most notable in square planar complexes, although it can also be observed for octahedral complexes. The analogous cis effect is most often observed in octahedral transition metal complexes.

In addition to this kinetic trans effect, trans ligands also have an influence on the ground state of the molecule, the most notable ones being bond lengths and stability. Some authors prefer the term trans influence to distinguish it from the kinetic effect, while others use more specific terms such as structural trans effect or thermodynamic trans effect.

The discovery of the trans effect is attributed to Ilya Ilich Chernyaev, who recognized it and gave it a name in 1926.

== Kinetic trans effect ==
The intensity of the trans effect (as measured by the increase in rate of substitution of the trans ligand) follows this sequence:

F^{−}, H_{2}O, OH^{−} < NH_{3} < py < Cl^{−} < Br^{−} < I^{−}, SCN^{−}, NO_{2}^{−}, SC(NH_{2})_{2}, Ph^{−} < SO_{3}^{2−} < PR_{3}, AsR_{3}, SR_{2}, CH_{3}^{−} < H^{−}, NO, CO, CN^{−}, C_{2}H_{4}

One classic example of the trans effect is the synthesis of cisplatin and its trans isomer. The complex PtCl_{4}^{2−} reacts with ammonia to give [PtCl_{3}NH_{3}]^{−}. A second substitution by ammonia gives cis-[PtCl_{2}(NH_{3})_{2}], showing that Cl- has a greater trans effect than NH_{3}. The procedure is however complicated by the production of Magnus's green salt. As a result, cisplatin is produced commercially via [PtI_{4}]^{2−} as first reported by Dhara in 1970.

If, on the other hand, one starts from Pt(NH_{3})_{4}^{2+}, the trans product is obtained instead:

The trans effect in square complexes can be explained in terms of an addition/elimination mechanism that goes through a trigonal bipyramidal intermediate. Ligands with a high trans effect are in general those with high π acidity (as in the case of phosphines) or low-ligand lone-pair–d_{π} repulsions (as in the case of hydride), which prefer the more π-basic equatorial sites in the intermediate. The second equatorial position is occupied by the incoming ligand; due to the principle of microscopic reversibility, the departing ligand must also leave from an equatorial position. The third and final equatorial site is occupied by the trans ligand, so the net result is that the kinetically favored product is the one in which the ligand trans to the one with the largest trans effect is eliminated.

== Structural trans effect ==
The structural trans effect can be measured experimentally using X-ray crystallography, and is observed as a stretching of the bonds between the metal and the ligand trans to a trans-influencing ligand. Stretching by as much as 0.2 Å occurs with strong trans-influencing ligands such as hydride. A cis influence can also be observed, but is smaller than the trans influence. The relative importance of the cis and trans influences depends on the formal electron configuration of the metal center, and explanations have been proposed based on the involvement of the atomic orbitals.

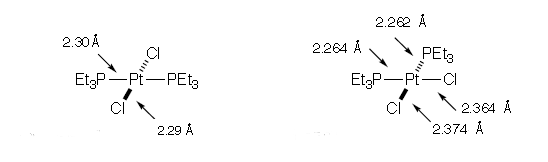
Example of the structural trans effect: the effect induced by triethylphosphine ligands is stronger than induced by chloride ion ligands.
