= Potassium tetraiodoplatinate =

Identifiers
CAS Number	14708-56-6 anhydrous
3D model (JSmol)	Interactive image; dihydrate: Interactive image
PubChem CID	12864171
- InChI: InChI=1S/4HI.2K.Pt/h4*1H;;;/q;;;;2*+1;+2/p-4 Key: WYVJXXSNNPZRSS-UHFFFAOYSA-J; dihydrate: InChI=1S/4I.2K.2H2O.Pt/h;;;;;;2*1H2;/q4*-1;2*+1;;;+2 Key: FVUALNGXMHIQHF-UHFFFAOYSA-N
- SMILES: [K+].[K+].[I-][Pt+2]([I-])([I-])[I-]; dihydrate: [K+].[K+].[I-][Pt+2]([I-])([I-])[I-].O.O

Properties
Chemical formula	H_{4}I_{4}K_{2}O_{2}Pt
Molar mass	816.928 g·mol^{−1}
Appearance	black solid
Density	4.31 g/cm^{3}

Related compounds
Other anions	Potassium tetrachloroplatinate
- Except where otherwise noted, data are given for materials in their standard state (at 25 °C [77 °F], 100 kPa). Infobox references

Potassium tetraiodoplatinate is the inorganic compound with the formula K_{2}PtI_{4}·(H_{2}O)_{2}. It is the potassium salt of tetraiodoplatinate, a square planar complex of platinum(II). The compound crystallizes from water as the dihydrate, whereas the related chloride and bromide K_{2}PtCl_{4} and K_{2}PtBr_{4} are obtained only as the anhydrous salts.

It reacts with amines and with ammonia to give charge-neutral derivatives PtI_{2}(RNH_{2})_{2}. The compound is prepared by the salt metathesis reaction of potassium iodide and potassium tetrachloroplatinate:

K_{2}PtCl_{4} + 4 KI → K_{2}PtI_{4} + 4 KCl

Potassium tetraiodoplatinate is a precursor to the anticancer drugs cisplatin and carboplatin.
