= Transplatin =

trans-Dichlorodiammineplatinum(II)

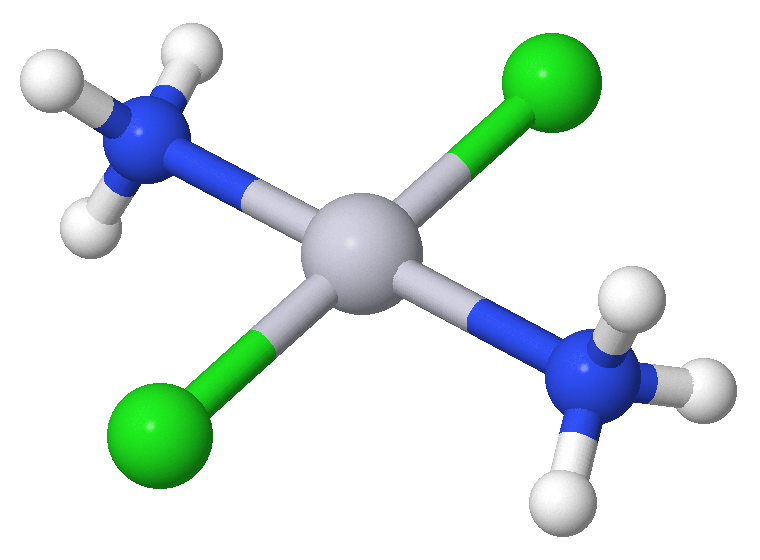

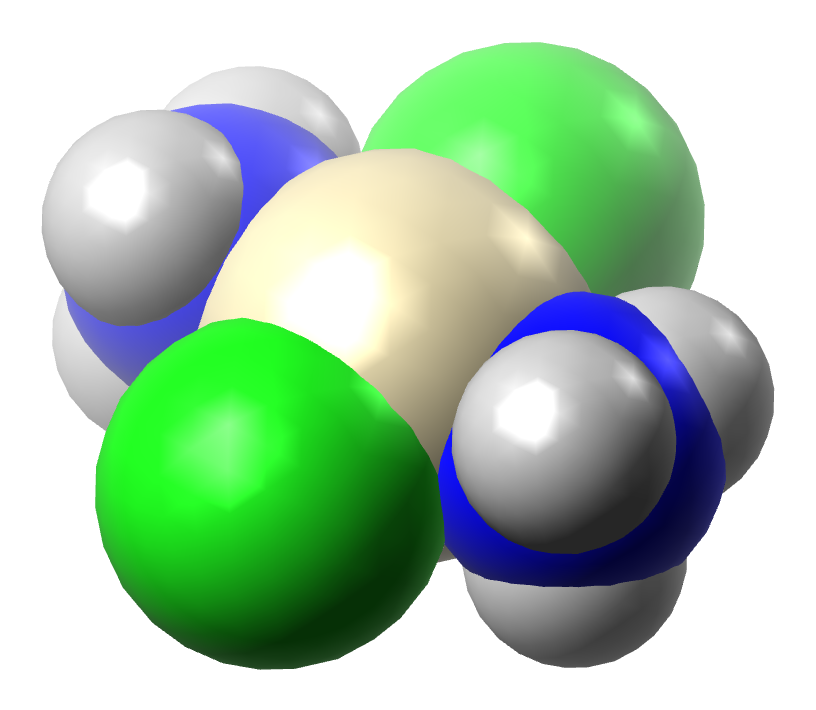

Names
- IUPAC name (SP-4-1)-diamminedichloridoplatinum(II)
- Other names Reiset's second chloride, transplatin

Identifiers
CAS Number	14913-33-8
3D model (JSmol)	Interactive image
ChemSpider	10771216
ECHA InfoCard	100.035.422
EC Number	239-733-8
PubChem CID	5702198
UNII	BW0OY6ZTD4
- InChI: InChI=1S/2ClH.2H3N.Pt/h2*1H;2*1H3;/q;;;;+2/p-2 Key: LXZZYRPGZAFOLE-UHFFFAOYSA-L
- SMILES: Cl[Pt@SP2](Cl)([NH3])[NH3]

Properties
Chemical formula	Cl_{2}H_{6}N_{2}Pt
Molar mass	300.05
Appearance	yellow solid
Solubility in water	low
- Except where otherwise noted, data are given for materials in their standard state (at 25 °C [77 °F], 100 kPa). Infobox references

trans-Dichlorodiammineplatinum(II) is the trans isomer of the coordination complex with the formula trans-PtCl_{2}(NH_{3})_{2}, sometimes called transplatin. It is a yellow solid with low solubility in water but good solubility in dimethylformamide. The existence of two isomers of PtCl_{2}(NH_{3})_{2} led Alfred Werner to propose square planar molecular geometry. It belongs to the molecular symmetry point group D_{2h}.

== Preparation and reactions ==
The complex is prepared by treating [Pt(NH_{3})_{4}]Cl_{2} with hydrochloric acid.

Many of the reactions of this complex can be explained by the trans effect. It slowly hydrolyzes in aqueous solution to give the mixed aquo complex trans-[PtCl(H_{2}O)(NH_{3})_{2}]Cl. Similarly it reacts with thiourea (tu) to give colorless trans-[Pt(tu)_{2}(NH_{3})_{2}]Cl_{2}. In contrast, the cis isomer gives [Pt(tu)_{4}]Cl_{2}. Oxidative addition of chlorine gives trans-PtCl_{4}(NH_{3})_{2}.

== Medicinal chemistry ==
trans-Dichlorodiammineplatinum(II) has had far less impact on medicinal chemistry compared to its cis isomer, cisplatin, which is a major anticancer drug. Nonetheless, replacement of the ammonia with other ligands has led to highly active drugs that have attracted much attention.
