= Potassium tetrachloroplatinate =

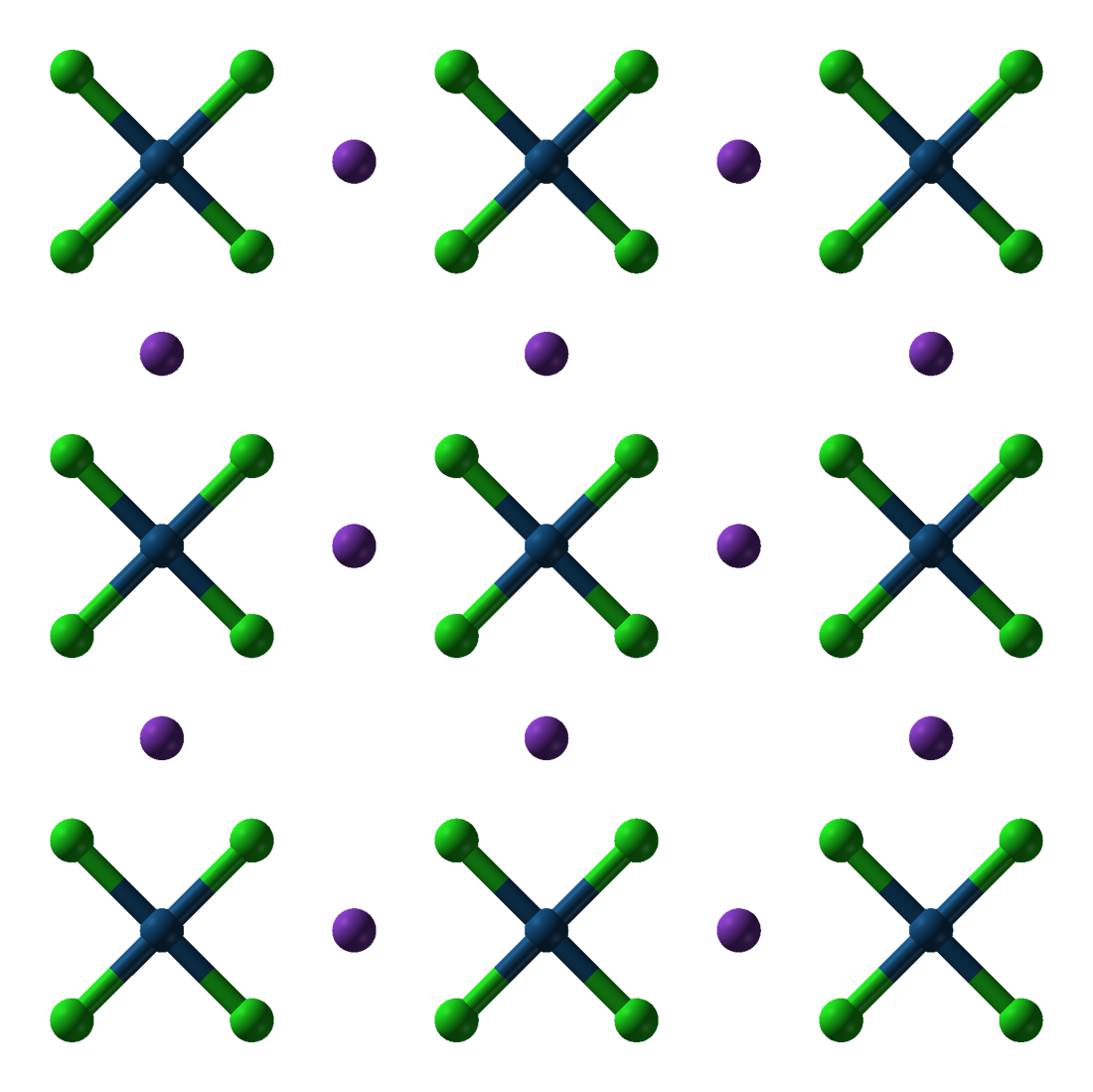

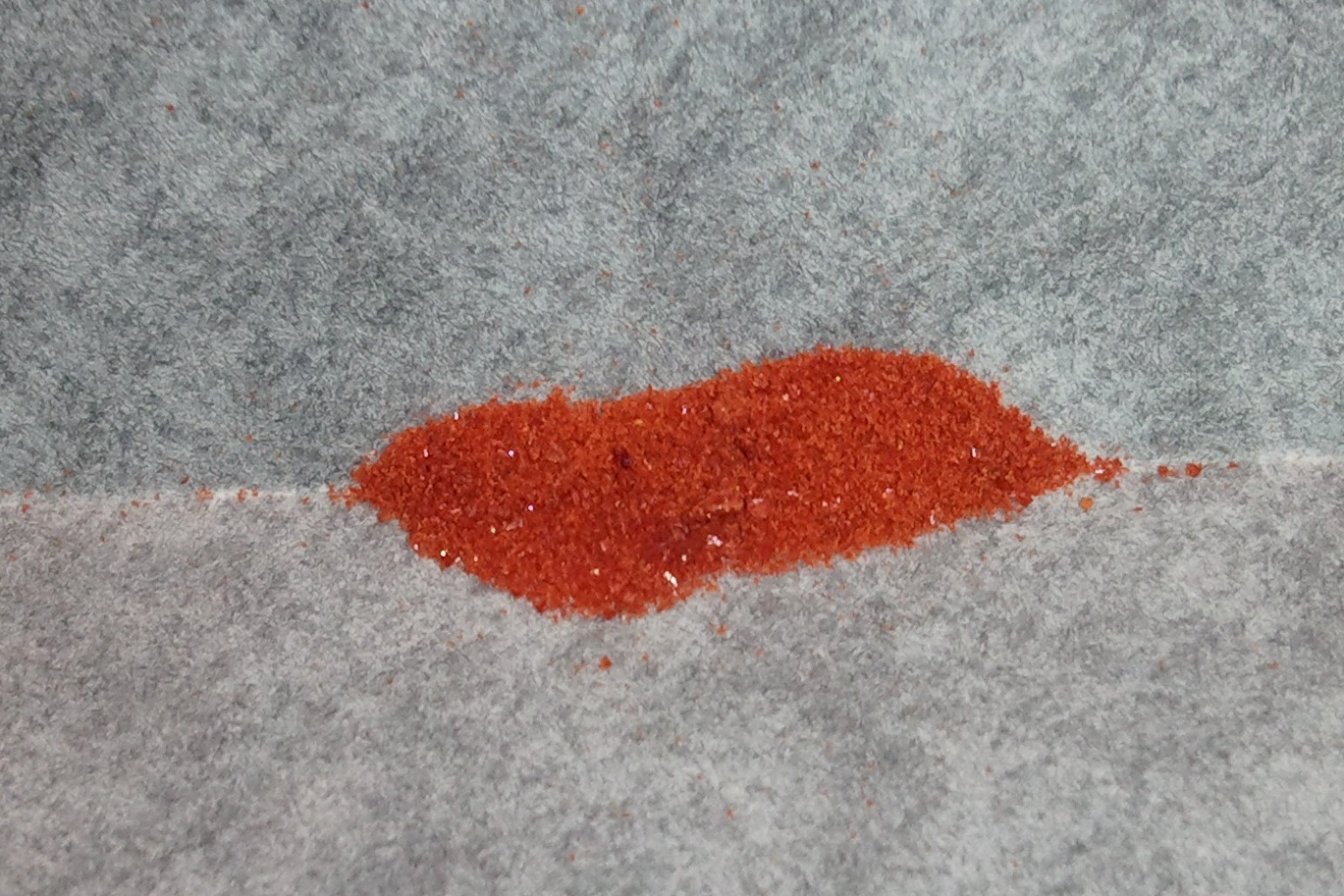

Names
- IUPAC name Potassium tetrachloridoplatinate(2–)
- Other names Potassium chloroplatinite

Identifiers
CAS Number	10025-99-7
3D model (JSmol)	Interactive image
ChemSpider	55364
ECHA InfoCard	100.030.034
EC Number	233-050-9
PubChem CID	61440
UNII	B74O00UCWC
CompTox Dashboard (EPA)	DTXSID10904020
- InChI: InChI=1S/4ClH.2K.Pt/h4*1H;;;/q;;;;2*+1;+2/p-4 Key: RVRDLMCWUILSAH-UHFFFAOYSA-J; InChI=1/4ClH.2K.Pt/h4*1H;;;/q;;;;2*+1;+2/p-4/rCl4Pt.2K/c1-5(2,3)4;;/q-2;2*+1 Key: RVRDLMCWUILSAH-SSOJXQLRAM
- SMILES: [K+].[K+].Cl[Pt-2](Cl)(Cl)Cl

Properties
Chemical formula	K_{2}PtCl_{4}
Molar mass	415.09 g/mol
Appearance	reddish solid
Density	3.38 g/cm^{3}
Melting point	265 °C (509 °F; 538 K)
Solubility in water	0.93 g/100 mL (16 °C); 5.3 g/100 mL (100 °C)

Hazards
- GHS labelling
Pictograms	(GHS05: Corrosive) (GHS06: Toxic) (GHS07: Exclamation mark) (GHS08: Health hazard)
Signal word	Danger
Hazard statements	H301, H315, H317, H318, H334
Precautionary statements	P261, P264, P270, P272, P280, P285, P301+P310, P302+P352, P304+P341, P305+P351+P338, P310, P321, P330, P332+P313, P333+P313, P342+P311, P362, P363, P405, P501
NFPA 704 (fire diamond)	3 0 0
Flash point	Nonflammable

Related compounds
Other anions	Potassium hexachloroplatinate
Other cations	Magnus's green salt Sodium chloroplatinate
- Except where otherwise noted, data are given for materials in their standard state (at 25 °C [77 °F], 100 kPa). verify (what is ?) Infobox references

Potassium tetrachloroplatinate(II) is the chemical compound with the formula K_{2}PtCl_{4}. This reddish orange salt is an important reagent for the preparation of other coordination complexes of platinum. It consists of potassium cations and the square planar dianion PtCl^{2−}_{4}. Related salts are also known including Na_{2}PtCl_{4}, which is brown-colored and soluble in alcohols, and quaternary ammonium salts, which are soluble in a broader range of organic solvents.

== Preparation ==
Potassium tetrachloroplatinate is prepared by reduction of the corresponding hexachloroplatinate salt with sulfur dioxide. K_{2}PtCl_{4} is one of the salts that is most easily obtained from platinum ores. The complex is appreciably soluble only in water. Treatment with alcohols, especially in the presence of base, causes reduction to platinum metal. Organic tetrachloroplatinate salts, such as [PPN]_{2}PtCl_{4} are soluble in chlorocarbons.

== Reactions ==
The chloride ligands on [PtCl_{4}]^{2−} are displaced by many other ligands. Upon reaction with triphenylphosphine, [PtCl_{4}]^{2−} converts to cis-bis(triphenylphosphine)platinum chloride:

PtCl_{4}^{2−} + 2 PPh_{3} → cis-PtCl_{2}(PPh_{3})_{2} + 2 Cl^{−}

The anti-cancer drug Cisplatin can similarly be prepared:

PtCl_{4}^{2−} + 2 NH_{3} → cis-PtCl_{2}(NH_{3})_{2} + 2 Cl^{−}

Enedithiolates displace all four chloride ligands to give bis(dithiolene) complexes. Reduction gives colloidal platinum of potential interest for catalysis.

Historically, an important reaction involves ammonia and [PtCl_{4}]^{2−}. This reaction affords a deep green precipitate with empirical formula PtCl_{2}(NH_{3})_{2}. This material, known as Magnus' green salt, is a semiconducting coordination polymer consisting of chains of alternating [PtCl_{4}]^{2−} and [Pt(NH_{3})_{4}]^{2+} centres.
