= Square planar molecular geometry =

Molecular geometry of five coplanar atoms

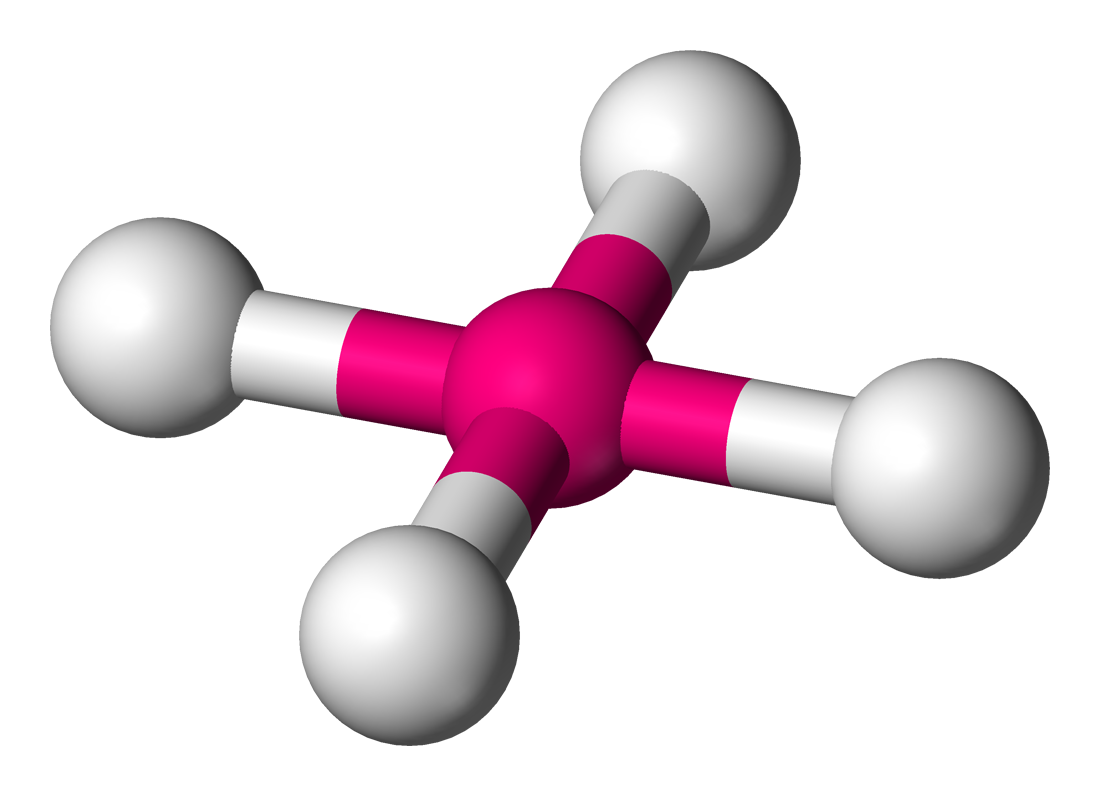
- Examples: Xenon tetrafluoride, Potassium tetrachloroplatinate
- Point group: D_{4h}
- Coordination number: 4
- Bond angle(s): 90°
- μ (Polarity): 0

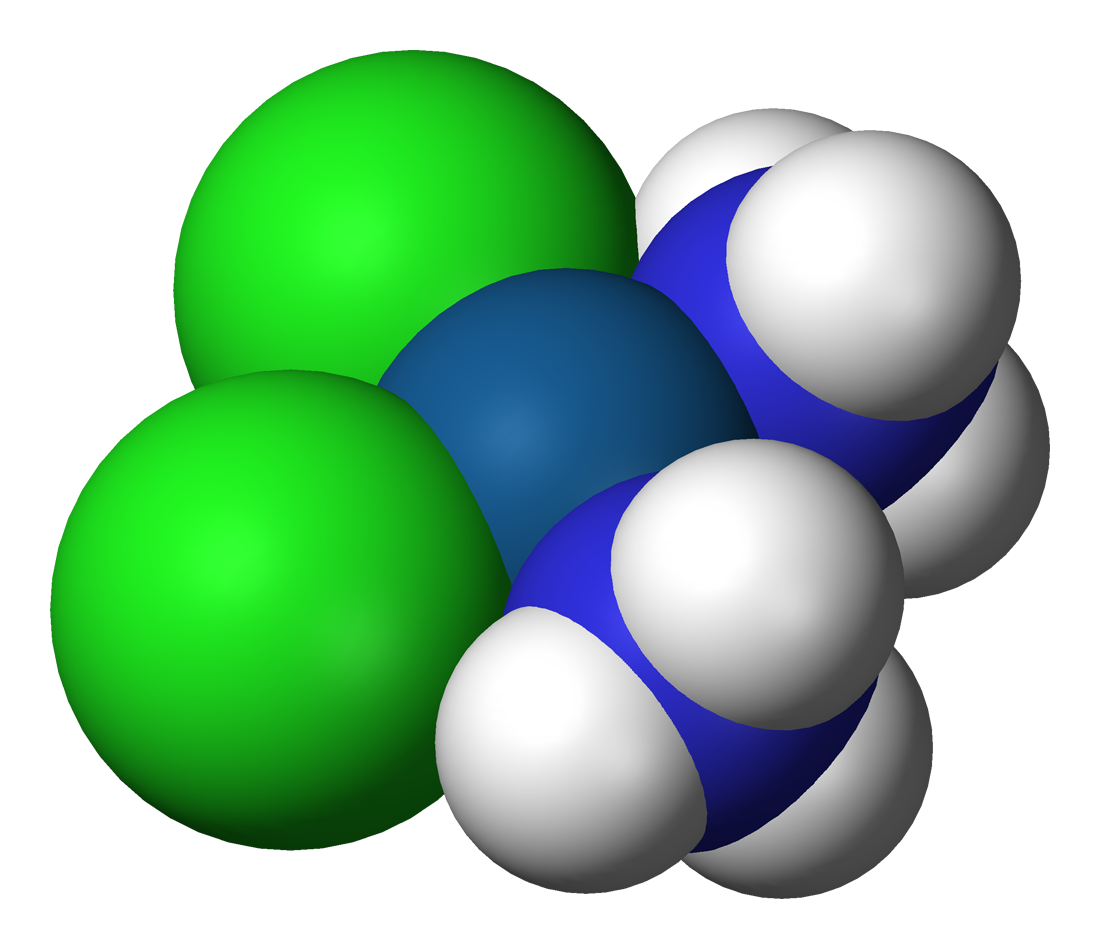
Structure of cisplatin, an example of a molecule with the square planar coordination geometry.

In chemistry, the square planar molecular geometry describes the stereochemistry (spatial arrangement of atoms) that is adopted by certain chemical compounds. As the name suggests, molecules of this geometry have their atoms positioned at the corners.

== Examples ==
Numerous compounds adopt this geometry, examples being especially numerous for transition metal complexes. The noble gas compound xenon tetrafluoride adopts this structure as predicted by VSEPR theory. The geometry is prevalent for transition metal complexes with d^{8} configuration, which includes Rh(I), Ir(I), Pd(II), Pt(II), and Au(III). Notable examples include the anticancer drugs cisplatin, [PtCl_{2}(NH_{3})_{2}], and carboplatin. Many homogeneous catalysts are square planar in their resting state, such as Wilkinson's catalyst and Crabtree's catalyst. Other examples include Vaska's complex and Zeise's salt. Certain ligands (such as porphyrins) stabilize this geometry.

== Splitting of d-orbitals ==
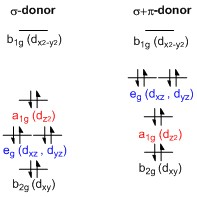
Representative d-orbital splitting diagrams for square planar complexes featuring σ-donor (left) and σ+π-donor (right) ligands.

A general d-orbital splitting diagram for square planar (D_{4h}) transition metal complexes can be derived from the general octahedral (O_{h}) splitting diagram, in which the d_{z^{2}} and the d_{x^{2}−y^{2}} orbitals are degenerate and higher in energy than the degenerate set of d_{xy}, d_{xz} and d_{yz} orbitals. When the two axial ligands are removed to generate a square planar geometry, the d_{z^{2}} orbital is driven lower in energy as electron-electron repulsion with ligands on the z-axis is no longer present. However, for purely σ-donating ligands the d_{z^{2}} orbital is still higher in energy than the d_{xy}, d_{xz} and d_{yz} orbitals because of the torus shaped lobe of the d_{z^{2}} orbital. It bears electron density on the x- and y-axes and therefore interacts with the filled ligand orbitals. The d_{xy}, d_{xz} and d_{yz} orbitals are generally presented as degenerate but they have to split into two different energy levels with respect to the irreducible representations of the point group D_{4h}. Their relative ordering depends on the nature of the particular complex. Furthermore, the splitting of d-orbitals is perturbed by π-donating ligands in contrast to octahedral complexes. In the square planar case strongly π-donating ligands can cause the d_{xz} and d_{yz} orbitals to be higher in energy than the d_{z^{2}} orbital, whereas in the octahedral case π-donating ligands only affect the magnitude of the d-orbital splitting and the relative ordering of the orbitals is conserved.

== See also ==
- AXE method
- Molecular geometry
