= D electron count =

Description of the electron configuration

The d electron count or number of d electrons is a chemistry formalism used to describe the electron configuration of the valence electrons of a transition metal center in a coordination complex. The d electron count is an effective way to understand the geometry and reactivity of transition metal complexes. The formalism has been incorporated into the two major models used to describe coordination complexes; crystal field theory and ligand field theory, which is a more advanced version based on molecular orbital theory. However the d electron count of an atom in a complex is often different from the d electron count of a free atom or a free ion of the same element.

== Electron configurations of transition metal atoms ==
For free atoms, electron configurations have been determined by atomic spectroscopy. Lists of atomic energy levels and their electron configurations have been published by the National Institute of Standards and Technology (NIST) for both neutral and ionized atoms.

For neutral atoms of all elements, the ground-state electron configurations are listed in general chemistry and inorganic chemistry textbooks. The ground-state configurations are often explained using two principles: the Aufbau principle that subshells are filled in order of increasing energy, and the Madelung rule that this order corresponds to the order of increasing values of (n + l) where n is the principal quantum number and l is the azimuthal quantum number. This rule predicts for example that the 4s orbital (n = 4, l = 0, n + l = 4) is filled before the 3d orbital (n = 3, l = 2, n + l = 5), as in titanium with configuration [Ar]4s^{2}3d^{2}.

There are a few exceptions with only one electron (or zero for palladium) in the ns orbital in favor of completing a half or a whole d shell. The usual explanation in chemistry textbooks is that half-filled or completely filled subshells are particularly stable arrangements of electrons. An example is chromium whose electron configuration is [Ar]4s^{1}3d^{5} with a d electron count of 5 for a half-filled d subshell, although Madelung's rule predicts [Ar]4s^{2}3d^{4}. Similarly copper is [Ar]4s^{1}3d^{10} with a full d subshell, and not [Ar]4s^{2}3d^{9}. The configuration of palladium is [Kr]4d^{10} with zero 5s electrons. However this trend is not consistent: tungsten, a group VI element like Cr and Mo has a Madelung-following [Xe]6s^{2}4f^{14}5d^{4}, and niobium has a [Kr]5s^{1}4d^{4} as opposed to the Madelung rule predicted [Kr]5s^{2}4d^{3} which creates two partially-filled subshells.

When a transition metal atom loses one or more electrons to form a positive ion, overall electron repulsion is reduced and the n d orbital energy is lowered more than the (n+1) s orbital energy. The ion is formed by removal of the outer s electrons and tends to have a d^{n} configuration, even though the s subshell is added to neutral atoms before the d subshell. For example, the Ti^{2+} ion has the ground-state configuration [Ar]3d^{2} with a d electron count of 2, even though the total number of electrons is the same as the neutral calcium atom which is [Ar]4s^{2}.

In coordination complexes between an electropositive transition metal atom and an electronegative ligand, the transition metal is approximately in an ionic state as assumed in crystal field theory, so that the electron configuration and d electron count are those of the transition metal ion rather than the neutral atom.

== Ligand field perspective ==
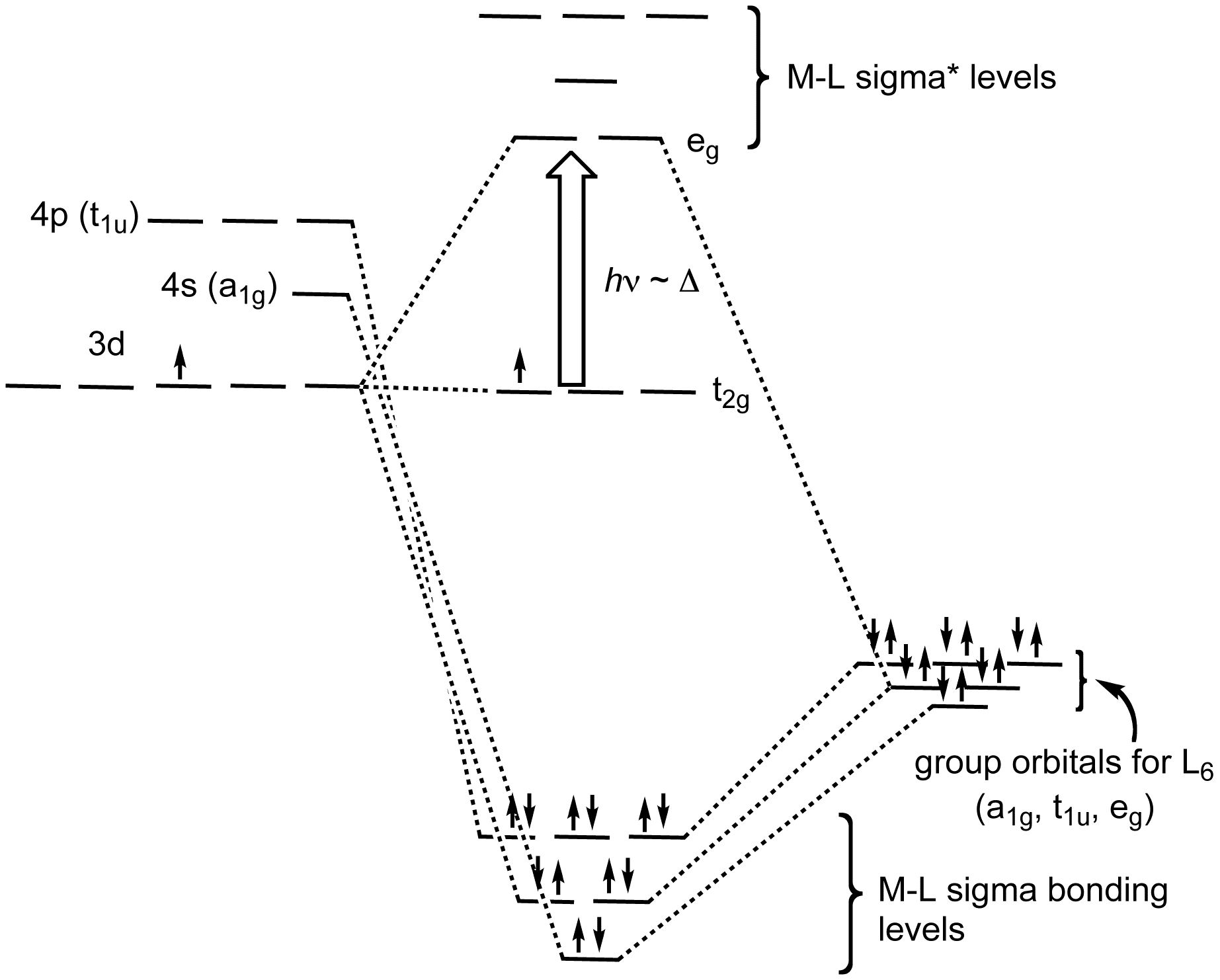
Ligand field scheme summarizing σ-bonding in the octahedral complex [Ti(H_{2}O)_{6}]^{3+}.

According to Ligand Field Theory, the ns orbital is involved in bonding to the ligands and forms a strongly bonding orbital which has predominantly ligand character and the correspondingly strong anti-bonding orbital which is unfilled and usually well above the lowest unoccupied molecular orbital (LUMO). Since the orbitals resulting from the ns orbital are either buried in bonding or elevated well above the valence, the ns orbitals are not relevant to describing the valence. Depending on the geometry of the final complex, either all three of the np orbitals or portions of them are involved in bonding, similar to the ns orbitals. The np orbitals if any that remain non-bonding still exceed the valence of the complex. That leaves the (n − 1)d orbitals to be involved in some portion of the bonding and in the process also describes the metal complex's valence electrons. The final description of the valence is highly dependent on the complex's geometry, in turn highly dependent on the d electron count and character of the associated ligands.

For example, in the MO diagram provided for the [Ti(H_{2}O)_{6}]^{3+} the ns orbital – which is placed above (n − 1)d in the representation of atomic orbitals (AOs) – is used in a linear combination with the ligand orbitals, forming a very stable bonding orbital with significant ligand character as well as an unoccupied high energy antibonding orbital which is not shown. In this situation the complex geometry is octahedral, which means two of the d orbitals have the proper geometry to be involved in bonding. The other three d orbitals in the basic model do not have significant interactions with the ligands and remain as three degenerate non-bonding orbitals. The two orbitals that are involved in bonding form a linear combination with two ligand orbitals with the proper symmetry. This results in two filled bonding orbitals and two orbitals which are usually the lowest unoccupied molecular orbitals (LUMO) or the highest partially filled molecular orbitals – a variation on the highest occupied molecular orbitals (HOMO).

Crystal field theory is an alternative description of electronic configurations that is simplified relative to LFT. It rationalizes a number of phenomena, but does not describe bonding nor offer an explanation for why ns electrons are ionized before (n − 1)d electrons.

== Tanabe–Sugano diagram ==
Each of the ten possible d electron counts has an associated Tanabe–Sugano diagram describing gradations of possible ligand field environments a metal center could experience in an octahedral geometry. The Tanabe–Sugano diagram with a small amount of information accurately predicts absorptions in the UV and visible electromagnetic spectrum resulting from d to d orbital electron transitions. It is these d–d transitions, ligand to metal charge transfers (LMCT), or metal to ligand charge transfers (MLCT) that generally give metals complexes their vibrant colors.

== Limitation ==
Counting d electrons is a formalism. Often it is difficult or impossible to assign electrons and charge to the metal center or a ligand. For a high-oxidation-state metal center with a +4 charge or greater it is understood that the true charge separation is much smaller. But referring to the formal oxidation state and d electron count can still be useful when trying to understand the chemistry.

== Possible d electron counts ==
There are many examples of every possible d electron configuration. What follows is a short description of common geometries and characteristics of each possible d electron count and representative examples.

d^{0}
Commonly tetrahedral; however it is possible for d^{0} complexes to accommodate many electron pairs (bonds/coordination number) since their d orbitals are empty and well away from the 18-electron ceiling. Often colorless due to the lack of d to d transitions.
Examples: titanium tetrachloride, titanocene dichloride, Schwartz's reagent.

d^{1}
Examples: molybdenum(V) chloride, vanadyl acetylacetonate, vanadocene dichloride, vanadium tetrachloride.

d^{2}
Examples: titanocene dicarbonyl.

d^{3}
Examples: Reinecke's salt.

d^{4}
Octahedral high-spin: 4 unpaired electrons, paramagnetic, substitutionally labile.
Octahedral low-spin: 2 unpaired electrons, paramagnetic, substitutionally inert.

d^{5}

High-spin [Fe(NO_{2})_{6}]^{3−} crystal field diagram

Low-spin [Fe(NO_{2})_{6}]^{3−} crystal field diagram

Octahedral high-spin: 5 unpaired electrons, paramagnetic, substitutionally labile.
Octahedral low-spin: 1 unpaired electron, paramagnetic, substitutionally inert.
Examples: potassium ferrioxalate, vanadium carbonyl.

d^{6}
Commonly octahedral complexes in both high spin and low spin.
Octahedral high-spin: 4 unpaired electrons, paramagnetic, substitutionally labile.
Octahedral low-spin: no unpaired electrons, diamagnetic, substitutionally inert.
Examples: hexamminecobalt(III) chloride, sodium cobaltinitrite, molybdenum hexacarbonyl, ferrocene, ferroin, chromium carbonyl.

d^{7}
Octahedral high spin: 3 unpaired electrons, paramagnetic, substitutionally labile.
Octahedral low spin: 1 unpaired electron, paramagnetic, substitutionally labile.
Examples: cobaltocene.

d^{8}
Complexes which are d^{8} high-spin are usually octahedral (or tetrahedral) while low-spin d^{8} complexes are generally 16-electron square planar complexes. For first row transition metal complexes such as Ni^{2+} and Cu^{+} also form five-coordinate 18-electron species which vary from square pyramidal to trigonal bipyramidal.
Octahedral high spin: 2 unpaired electrons, paramagnetic, substitutionally labile.
Square planar low spin: no unpaired electrons, diamagnetic, substitutionally inert.
Examples: cisplatin, nickelocene, dichlorobis(ethylenediamine)nickel(II), iron pentacarbonyl, Zeise's salt, Vaska's complex, Wilkinson's catalyst.

d^{9}
Stable complexes with this electron count are more common for first row (period four) transition metals center than they are for complexes based around second or third row transition metals centers. These include both four-coordinate 17-electron species and five-coordinate 19-electron species.
Examples: Schweizer's reagent.

d^{10}
Often tetrahedral complexes limited to form 4 additional bonds (8 additional electrons) by the 18-electron ceiling. Often colorless due to the lack of d to d transitions.
Examples: tetrakis(triphenylphosphine)palladium(0), nickel carbonyl.
