= Metal ammine complex =

Class of chemical compounds

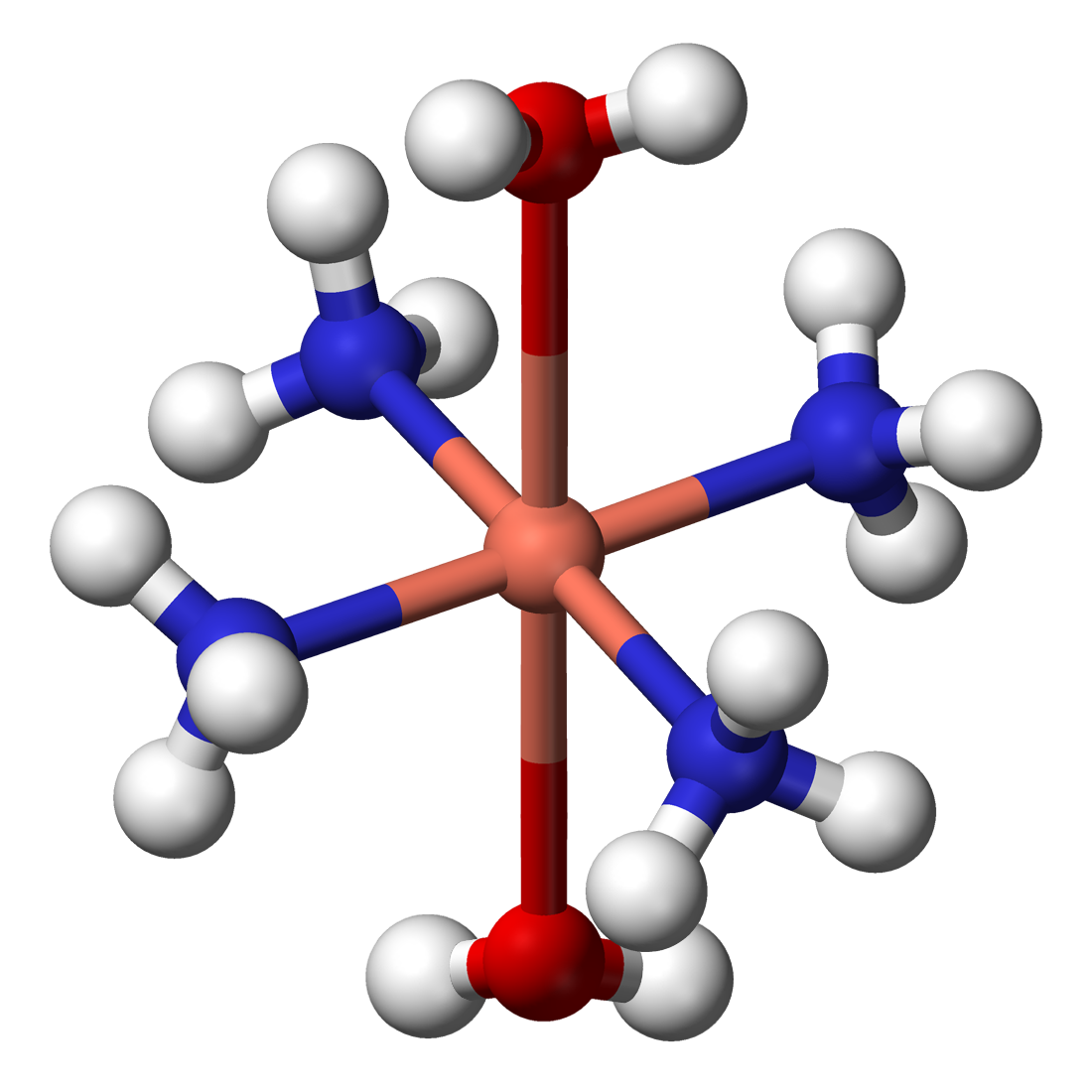
Ball-and-stick model of the tetraamminediaquacopper(II) cation, [Cu(NH_{3})_{4}(H_{2}O)_{2}]^{2+}

In coordination chemistry, metal ammine complexes are metal complexes containing at least one ammonia (NH_{3}) ligand. Ammonia binds to almost all metal ions as a ligand, but the most prevalent examples of ammine complexes are for Cr(III), Co(III), Ni(II), Cu(II) as well as several platinum group metals.

Ammine is spelled this way for historical reasons; in contrast, alkyl- or aryl-bearing ligands are spelled with a single m. Some ammine complexes have non-standard names that use amine with a single m instead of ammine with two m in their standard names (see examples).

== History ==
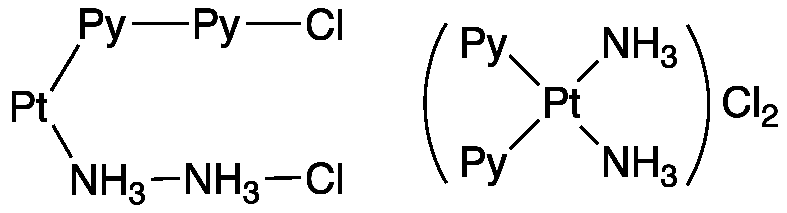
Structural representations used by Alfred Werner (right) and Sophus Mads Jørgensen for one isomer of the dichloride salt of the complex Pt(NH_{3})_{2}(pyridine)_{2}]^{2+}.

Ammine complexes played a major role in the development of coordination chemistry, specifically determination of the stereochemistry and structure. They are easily prepared, and the metal-nitrogen ratio can be determined by elemental analysis. Through studies mainly on the ammine complexes, Alfred Werner developed his Nobel Prize-winning concept of the structure of coordination compounds (see Figure).

Originally salts of [Co(NH_{3})_{6}]^{3+} were described as the luteo (Latin: yellow) complex of cobalt. This name has been discarded as modern chemistry considers color less important than molecular structure. Other metal ammine complexes were also labeled according to their color, such as purpureo (Latin: purple) for a cobalt pentammine complex, and praseo (Greek: green) and violeo (Latin: violet) for two isomeric tetrammine complexes.

One of the first ammine complexes to be described was Magnus' green salt, which consists of the platinum tetrammine complex [Pt(NH_{3})_{4}]^{2+}.

== Structure and bonding ==
Ammonia is a pure σ-donor, in the middle of the spectrochemical series, and shows intermediate hard–soft behavior (see also ECW model ). Rh(III) ammines, which are diamagnetic, have been characterized by ^{15}N NMR spectroscopy.

Ammonia is classified as an L ligand in the Covalent bond classification method. In the usual electron counting method, it is a two-electron ligand. Ammonia is also compact such that steric effects are negligible. These factors simplify interpretation of structural and spectroscopic results. The M–N distances in complexes [M(NH_{3})_{6}]^{n+} have been examined repeatedly by X-ray crystallography.

M–N distances for [M(NH_{3})_{6}]^{n+}
| M | n+ | M–N distance (Å) | d-electron configuration | comment |
|---|---|---|---|---|
| Co | 3+ | 1.936 | t_{2g}^{6} e_{g}^{0} | low-spin trications are small |
| Co | 2+ | 2.114 | t_{2g}^{5} e_{g}^{2} | population of e_{g} orbital and lower positive charge |
| Ru | 3+ | 2.104 | t_{2g}^{5} e_{g}^{0} | low spin trication, but Ru is intrinsically larger than Co |
| Ru | 2+ | 2.144 | t_{2g}^{6} e_{g}^{0} | low spin dication |

== Examples ==
Homoleptic poly(ammine) complexes are known for many of the transition metals. Most often, they have the formula [M(NH_{3})_{6}]^{n+} where n = 2, 3, and even 4 (M = Pt).

=== Platinum group metals ===
Platinum group metals form diverse ammine complexes. Pentaamine(dinitrogen)ruthenium(II) and the Creutz–Taube complex are well-studied examples of historic significance. The complex cis-[PtCl_{2}(NH_{3})_{2}], under the name Cisplatin, is an important anticancer drug. Pentamminerhodium chloride ([RhCl(NH_{3})_{5}]^{2+}) is an intermediate in the purification of rhodium from its ores.

Metal-Ammine Complexes

Carboplatin, a widely used anticancer drug.

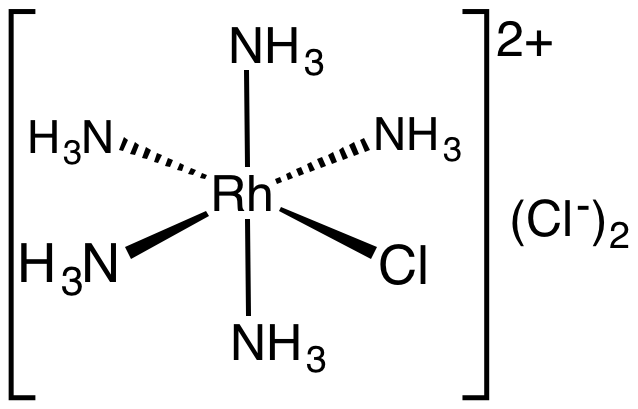
Pentamminerhodium chloride, the dichloride salt of a pentammine halide complex.

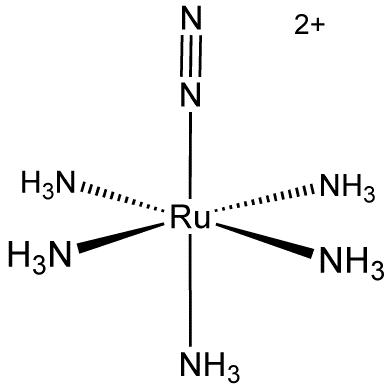
Pentaamine(dinitrogen)ruthenium(II), the first metal dinitrogen complex.

Hexamminecobalt(III) chloride, the trichloride salt of the hexammine complex [Co(NH_{3})_{6}]^{3+}. It is famously stable in concentrated hydrochloric acid.

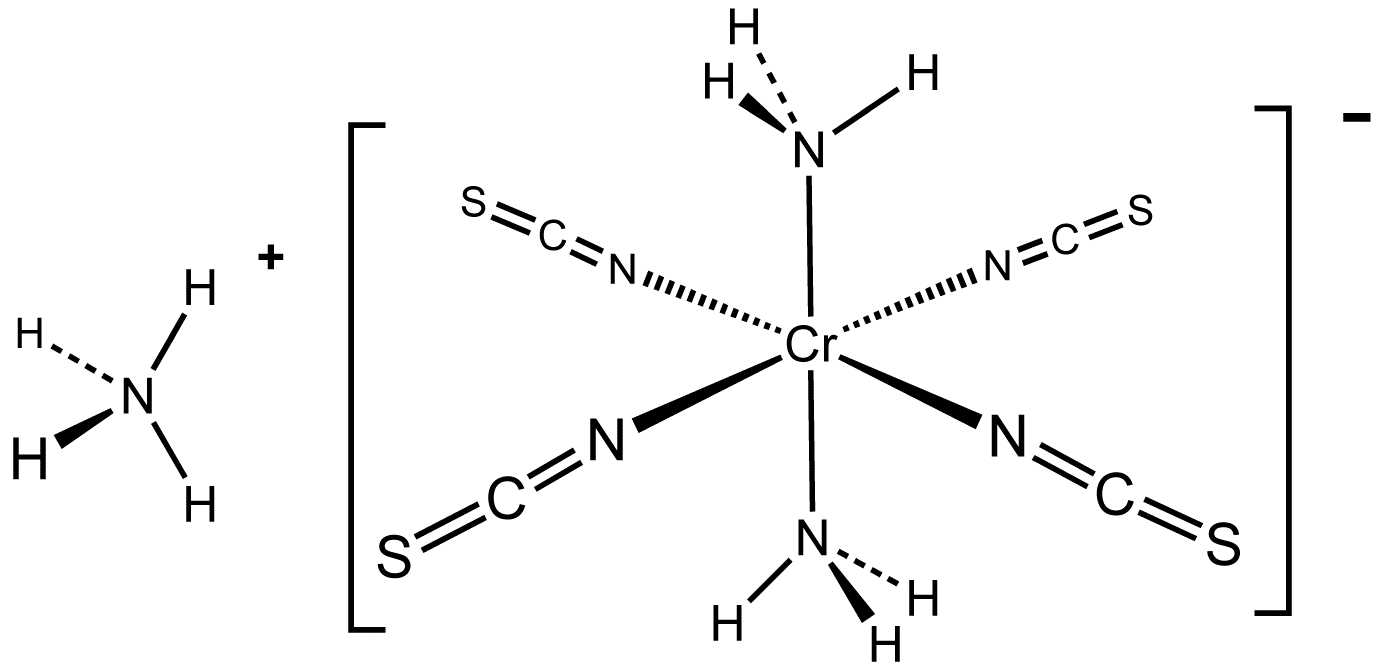
Reinecke's salt features a very stable anionic diammine complex of Cr(III), which is used as a counteranion.

=== Cobalt(III) and chromium(III) ===
The ammines of chromium(III) and cobalt(III) are of historic significance. Both families of ammines are relatively inert kinetically, which allows the separation of isomers. For example, tetraamminedichlorochromium(III) chloride, [Cr(NH_{3})_{4}Cl_{2}]^{+}, has two forms - the cis isomer is violet, while the trans isomer is green. The trichloride of the hexaammine (hexamminecobalt(III) chloride, [Co(NH_{3})_{6}]Cl_{3}) exists as only a single isomer. "Reinecke's salt" with the formula [NH_{4}]^{+}[Cr(NCS)_{4}(NH_{3})_{2}]^{−}·H_{2}O was first reported in 1863.

=== Nickel(II), zinc(II), copper(II) ===
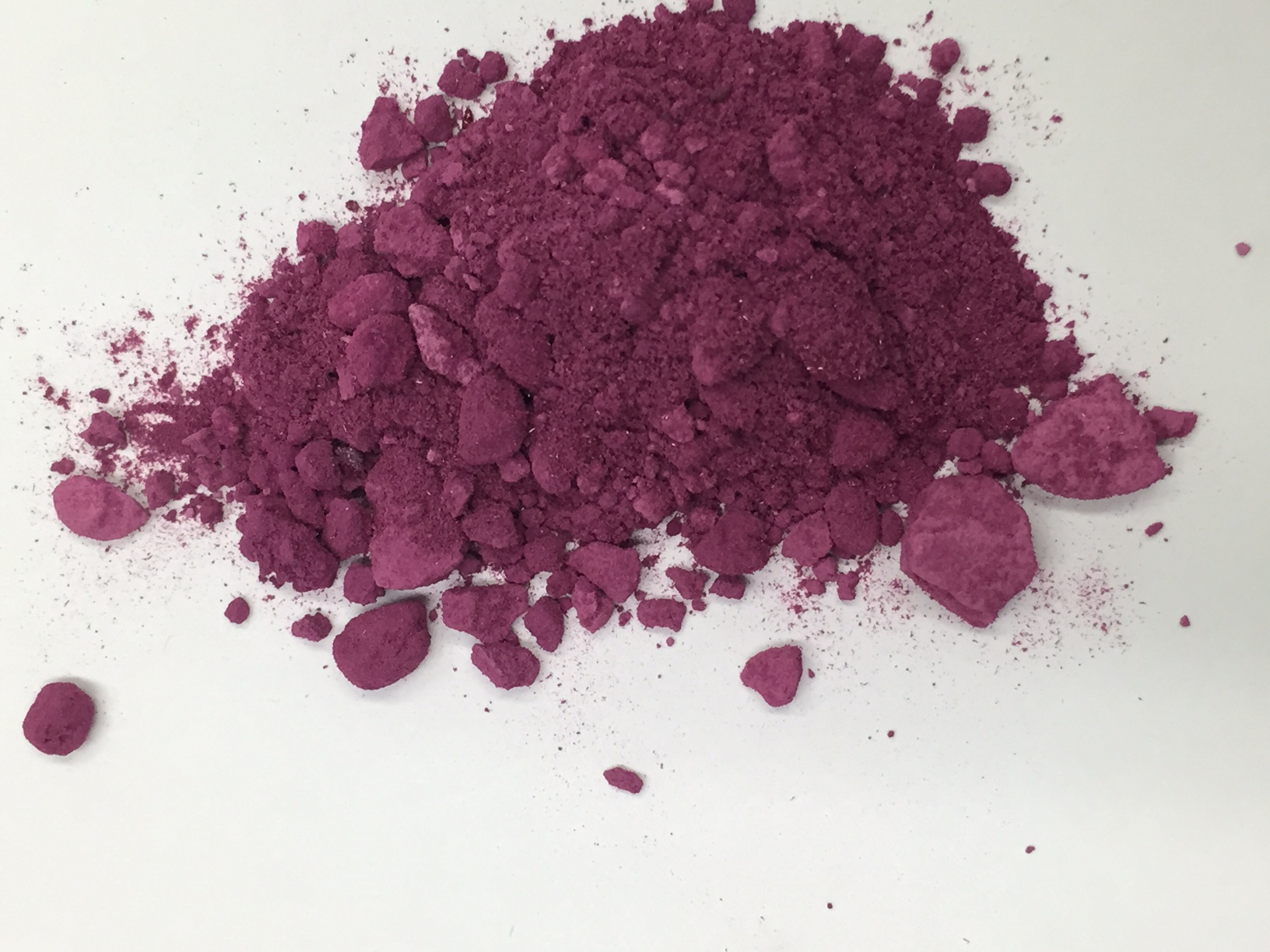
Sample of chloropentamminecobalt chloride [CoCl(NH_{3})_{5}]Cl_{2}, illustrating the vibrant colors typical of transition metal ammine complexes.

Zinc(II) forms a colorless tetraammine with the formula [Zn(NH_{3})_{4}]^{2+}. Like most zinc complexes, it has a tetrahedral structure. Hexaamminenickel is violet, and the copper(II) complex is deep blue. The latter is characteristic of the presence of copper(II) in qualitative inorganic analysis.

=== Copper(I), silver(I), and gold(I) ===
Copper(I) forms only labile complexes with ammonia, including the trigonal planar [Cu(NH_{3})_{3}]^{+}. Silver gives the diammine complex [Ag(NH_{3})_{2}]^{+} with linear coordination geometry. It is this complex that forms when otherwise rather insoluble silver chloride dissolves in aqueous ammonia. The same complex is the active ingredient in Tollens' reagent. Gold(I) chloride reacts with ammonia to form [Au(NH_{3})_{2}]^{+}.

== Reactions ==
=== Ligand exchange and redox reactions ===
Since ammonia is a stronger ligand in the spectrochemical series than water, metal ammine complexes are stabilized relative to the corresponding aquo complexes. For similar reasons, metal ammine complexes are less strongly oxidizing than are the corresponding aquo complexes. The latter property is illustrated by the stability of [Co(NH_{3})_{6}]^{3+} in aqueous solution and the nonexistence of [Co(H_{2}O)_{6}]^{3+} (which would oxidize water).

=== Acid-base reactions ===
Once complexed to a metal ion, ammonia is no longer basic. This property is illustrated by the stability of some metal ammine complexes in strong acid solutions. When the M–NH_{3} bond is weak, the ammine ligand dissociates and protonation ensues. The behavior is illustrated by the respective non-reaction and reaction with [Co(NH_{3})_{6}]^{3+} and [Ni(NH_{3})_{6}]^{2+} toward aqueous acids. Related is the reaction of mercury(II) chloride with ammonia (Calomel reaction), where the resulting mercuric amidochloride is highly insoluble.

HgCl_{2} + 2 NH_{3} → HgCl(NH_{2}) + [NH_{4}]Cl

The ammine ligands are more acidic than is ammonia (pK_{a} ~ 33 in dmso). For highly cationic complexes such as [Pt(NH_{3})_{6}]^{4+}, the conjugate base can be obtained. The deprotonation of cobalt(III) ammine-halide complexes, e.g. [CoCl(NH_{3})_{5}]^{2+} labilises the Co–Cl bond, according to the Sn1CB mechanism.

=== Oxidation of ammonia ===
Deprotonation can be combined with oxidation, allowing the conversion of ammine complexes into nitrosyl complexes:

H_{2}O + [Ru(terpy)(bipy)(NH_{3})]^{+} → [Ru(terpy)(bipy)(NO)]^{2+} + 5 H^{+} + 6 e^{−}

=== H-atom transfer ===
In some ammine complexes, the N–H bond is weak. Thus one molybdenum ammine complex evolves hydrogen:

2 Mo(terpy)(PMe_{2}Ph)_{2}(NH_{3})]^{+} → 2 [Mo(terpy)(PMe_{2}Ph)_{2}(NH_{2})]^{+} + H_{2}

This behavior is relevant to the use of metal-ammine complexes as catalysts for the oxidation of ammonia.

== Applications ==
Metal ammine complexes find many uses. Cisplatin (cis-[PtCl_{2}(NH_{3})_{2}]) is a drug used in treating cancer. Many other ammine complexes of the platinum group metals have been evaluated for this application.

In the separation of the individual platinum metals from their ore, several schemes rely on the precipitation of [RhCl(NH_{3})_{5}]Cl_{2}. In some separation schemes, palladium is purified by manipulating equilibria involving [Pd(NH_{3})_{4}]Cl_{2}, [PdCl_{2}(NH_{3})_{2}], and [Pt(NH_{3})_{4}][PtCl_{4}] (Magnus' green salt).

In the processing of cellulose, the copper ammine complex known as Schweizer's reagent ([Cu(NH_{3})_{4}(H_{2}O)_{2}](OH)_{2}) is sometimes used to solubilise the polymer. Schweizer's reagent is prepared by treating an aqueous solutions of copper(II) ions with ammonia. Initially, the light blue hydroxide precipitates only to redissolve upon addition of more ammonia:

[Cu(H_{2}O)_{6}]^{2+} + 2 OH^{−} → Cu(OH)_{2} + 6 H_{2}O
Cu(OH)_{2} + 4 NH_{3} + 2 H_{2}O → [Cu(NH_{3})_{4}(H_{2}O)_{2}]^{2+} + 2 OH^{−}

Silver diammine fluoride ([Ag(NH_{3})_{2}]F) is a topical medicament (drug) used to treat and prevent dental caries (cavities) and relieve dentinal hypersensitivity.

== See also ==
- Ligand field theory
