= Hexaammineplatinum(IV) chloride =

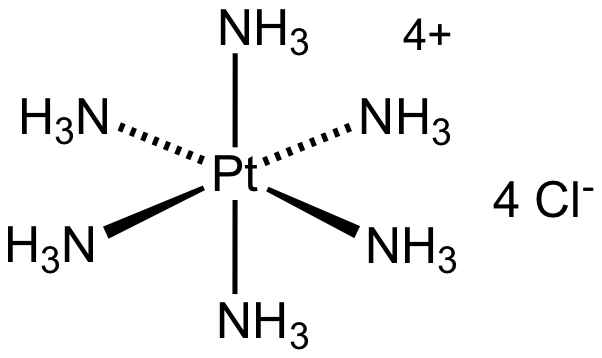

Names
- IUPAC name Hexaammineplatinum(IV) chloride
- Other names Platinum hexammine tetrachloride

Identifiers
CAS Number	18536-12-4; 16893-12-2
3D model (JSmol)	Interactive image
ChemSpider	146612
PubChem CID	167586
- InChI: InChI=1S/4ClH.6H3N.Pt/h4*1H;6*1H3;/q;;;;;;;;;;+4/p-4 Key: JYSAWBDXSVLKCG-UHFFFAOYSA-J
- SMILES: N.N.N.N.N.N.[Cl-].[Cl-].[Cl-].[Cl-].[Pt+4]

Properties
Chemical formula	Cl_{4}H_{18}N_{6}Pt
Molar mass	439.07 g·mol^{−1}
Appearance	white solid
Melting point	decomposes
Solubility	soluble in NH_{3}

Structure
Coordination geometry	octahedral
Dipole moment	0 D

Related compounds
Other cations	[Ni(NH_{3})_{6}]Cl_{2} [Co(NH_{3})_{6}]Cl_{3}
- Except where otherwise noted, data are given for materials in their standard state (at 25 °C [77 °F], 100 kPa). Infobox references

Hexaammineplatinum(IV) chloride is the chemical compound with the formula [Pt(NH_{3})_{6}]Cl_{4}. It is the chloride salt of the metal ammine complex [Pt(NH_{3})_{6}]^{4+}. The cation features six ammonia (called ammines in coordination chemistry) ligands attached to the platinum(IV) ion. It is a white, water soluble solid.

== Properties and structure ==
Typical for platinum(IV) complexes, [Pt(NH_{3})_{6}]^{4+} is diamagnetic and kinetically inert, e.g. unaffected by strong acids. The cation obeys the 18-electron rule. It is prepared by treatment of methylamine complex [Pt(NH_{2}CH_{3})_{4}Cl_{2}]Cl_{2} with ammonia.

The complex [Pt(NH_{3})_{6}]^{4+} is a rare example of a tetracationic ammine complex. Its conjugate bases [Pt(NH_{3})_{5}NH_{2}]^{3+} and [Pt(NH_{3})_{4}(NH_{2})_{2}]^{2+} have been characterized.
