= 1,3-Bis(diphenylphosphino)propane =

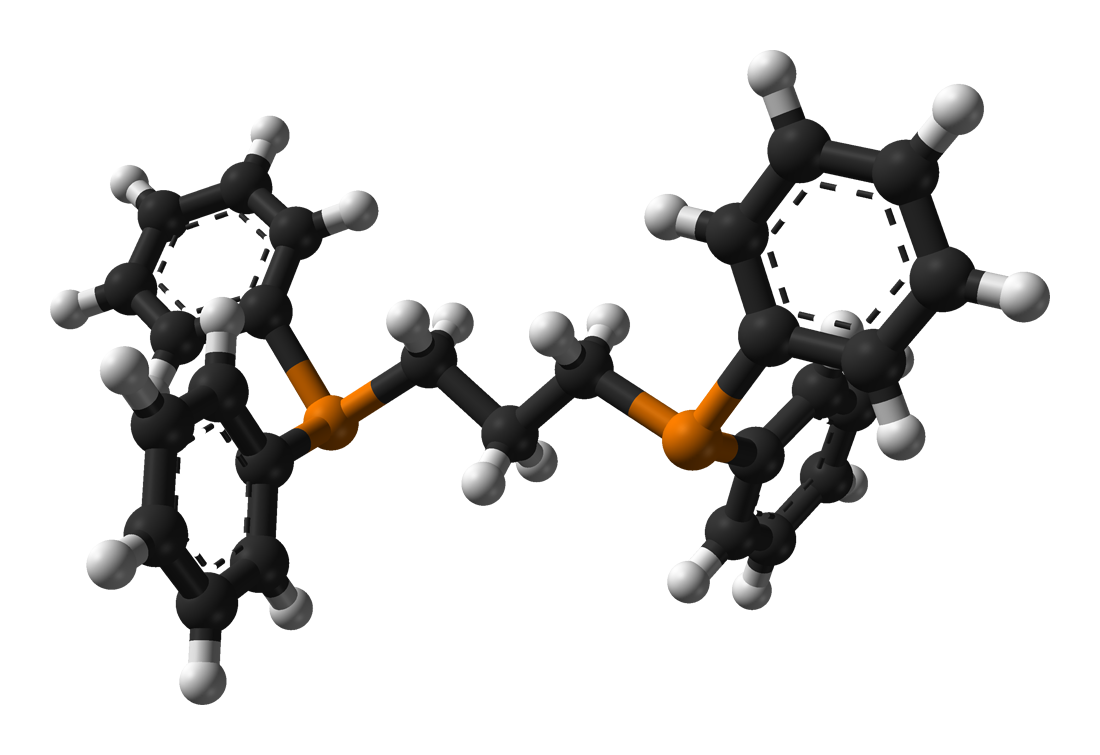

Names
- Preferred IUPAC name (Propane-1,3-diyl)bis(diphenylphosphane)

Identifiers
| CAS Number | 6737-42-4 |
| 3D model (JSmol) | Interactive image; Interactive image |
| Abbreviations | DPPP |
| ChEMBL | ChEMBL73394 |
| ChemSpider | 73276 |
| ECHA InfoCard | 100.027.084 |
| PubChem CID | 81219 |
| UNII | 44R56E2C68 |
| CompTox Dashboard (EPA) | DTXSID0064464 |
- InChI: InChI=1S/C27H26P2/c1-5-14-24(15-6-1)28(25-16-7-2-8-17-25)22-13-23-29(26-18-9-3-10-19-26)27-20-11-4-12-21-27/h1-12,14-21H,13,22-23H2 Key: LVEYOSJUKRVCCF-UHFFFAOYSA-N; InChI=1/C27H26P2/c1-5-14-24(15-6-1)28(25-16-7-2-8-17-25)22-13-23-29(26-18-9-3-10-19-26)27-20-11-4-12-21-27/h1-12,14-21H,13,22-23H2 Key: LVEYOSJUKRVCCF-UHFFFAOYAP
- SMILES: P(c1ccccc1)(c2ccccc2)CCCP(c3ccccc3)c4ccccc4; c1ccc(cc1)P(CCCP(c2ccccc2)c3ccccc3)c4ccccc4

Properties
| Chemical formula | C_{27}H_{26}P_{2} |
| Molar mass | 412.453 g·mol^{−1} |
| Appearance | white solid |
| Solubility in water | chlorocarbons |
- Except where otherwise noted, data are given for materials in their standard state (at 25 °C [77 °F], 100 kPa). verify (what is ?) Infobox references

1,3-Bis(diphenylphosphino)propane (dppp) is an organophosphorus compound with the formula Ph_{2}P(CH_{2})_{3}PPh_{2}. The compound is a white solid that is soluble in organic solvents. It is slightly air-sensitive, degrading in air to the phosphine oxide. It is classified as a diphosphine ligand in coordination chemistry and homogeneous catalysis.

The diphosphine can be prepared by the reaction of lithium diphenylphosphide and 1,3-dichloropropane (Ph = C_{6}H_{5}):

2 Ph_{2}PLi + Cl(CH_{2})_{3}Cl → Ph_{2}P(CH_{2})_{3}PPh_{2} + 2 LiCl

However, it can be synthesised via a much more controllable (and cheaper) route, via metal-halogen exchange and then metathesis:

Br(CH_{2})_{3}Br + 2 ^{t}BuLi → Li(CH_{2})_{3}Li + 2 ^{t}BuBr
Li(CH_{2})_{3}Li + 2 PCl_{3} → Cl_{2}P(CH_{2})_{3}PCl_{2} + 2 LiCl
Cl_{2}P(CH_{2})_{3}PCl_{2} + 4 PhLi → Ph_{2}P(CH_{2})_{3}PPh_{2} + 4 LiCl

== Coordination chemistry and use as co-catalyst ==
The diphosphine serves as a bidentate ligand forming six-membered C_{3}P_{2}M chelate ring with a natural bite angle of 91°. For example, the complex dichloro(1,3-bis(diphenylphosphino)propane)nickel is prepared by combining equimolar portions of the ligand and nickel(II) chloride hexahydrate. This nickel complex serves as a catalyst for the Kumada coupling reaction. Dppp is also used as a ligand for palladium(II) catalysts to co-polymerize carbon monoxide and ethylene to give polyketones. Dppp can sometimes be used in palladium-catalyzed arylation under Heck reaction conditions to control regioselectivity.
