= Dichloro(1,3-bis(diphenylphosphino)propane)nickel =

Dichloro[1,3-bis(diphenylphosphino)propane]nickel

Names
- Systematic IUPAC name Dichloro[1,3-propanediylbis(diphenylphosphanuide-κP)]nickel
- Other names 1,3-bis(diphenylphosphino)propanenickel(II) chloride; NiCl_{2}(dppp)

Identifiers
CAS Number	15629-92-2
3D model (JSmol)	Interactive image
ChemSpider	2007051
ECHA InfoCard	100.132.628
EC Number	605-052-3
PubChem CID	6329934
CompTox Dashboard (EPA)	DTXSID50935419
- InChI: InChI=1S/C27H26P2.2Cl.Ni/c1-5-14-24(15-6-1)28(25-16-7-2-8-17-25)22-13-23-29(26-18-9-3-10-19-26)27-20-11-4-12-21-27;;;/h1-12,14-21H,13,22-23H2;;;
- SMILES: Cl[Ni-2]1([P+](c2ccccc2)(c3ccccc3)CCC[P+]1(c4ccccc4)c5ccccc5)Cl

Properties
Chemical formula	C_{27}H_{26}Cl_{2}NiP_{2}
Molar mass	542.05 g·mol^{−1}
Appearance	Orange to red-orange powder
Melting point	213 °C (415 °F; 486 K)
Solubility in water	Insoluble

Hazards
- GHS labelling
Pictograms	(GHS07: Exclamation mark) (GHS08: Health hazard)
Signal word	Danger
Hazard statements	H315, H317, H319, H334, H335, H350
Precautionary statements	P201, P261, P280, P305+P351+P338, P308+P313
Safety data sheet (SDS)	External SDS
- Except where otherwise noted, data are given for materials in their standard state (at 25 °C [77 °F], 100 kPa). verify (what is ?) Infobox references

Dichloro[1,3-bis(diphenylphosphino)propane]nickel a coordination complex with the formula NiCl_{2}(dppp); where dppp is the diphosphine 1,3-bis(diphenylphosphino)propane. It is used as a catalyst in organic synthesis. The compound is a bright orange-red crystalline powder.

== Structure and properties ==
While the electronic and solid-state-supported structure of the chloride congener is not known (due to low solubility in common analytical solvents), several studies have been carried out on the bromo and iodo derivatives. The complexes display a temperature-dependent interconversion between square-planar and tetrahedral geometries (diamagnetic and paramagnetic) in polar organic solvents (Keq between 1-3.68, depending on the solvent and temperature). In contrast, dichloro(1,2-bis(diphenylphosphino)ethane)nickel adopts a static square-planar (diamagnetic) structure in solution.

== Preparation ==
NiCl_{2}(dppp) is prepared by combining equal molar portions of nickel(II) chloride hexahydrate with 1,3-bis(diphenylphosphino)propane in 2-propanol.

Ni(H_{2}O)_{6}Cl_{2} + dppp → NiCl_{2}(dppp) + 6 H_{2}O

== Reactions ==
NiCl_{2}(dppp) in an effective catalyst for coupling reactions such as the Kumada coupling and Suzuki reactions (example below). It also catalyzes other reactions that convert enol ethers, dithioacetals, and vinyl sulfides to olefins.

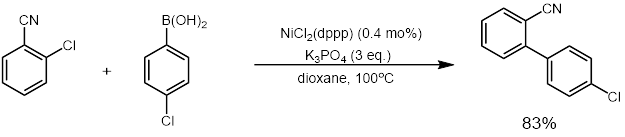
