= Dichloro(1,2-bis(diphenylphosphino)ethane)nickel =

Dichloro[1,2-bis(diphenylphosphino)ethane]nickel
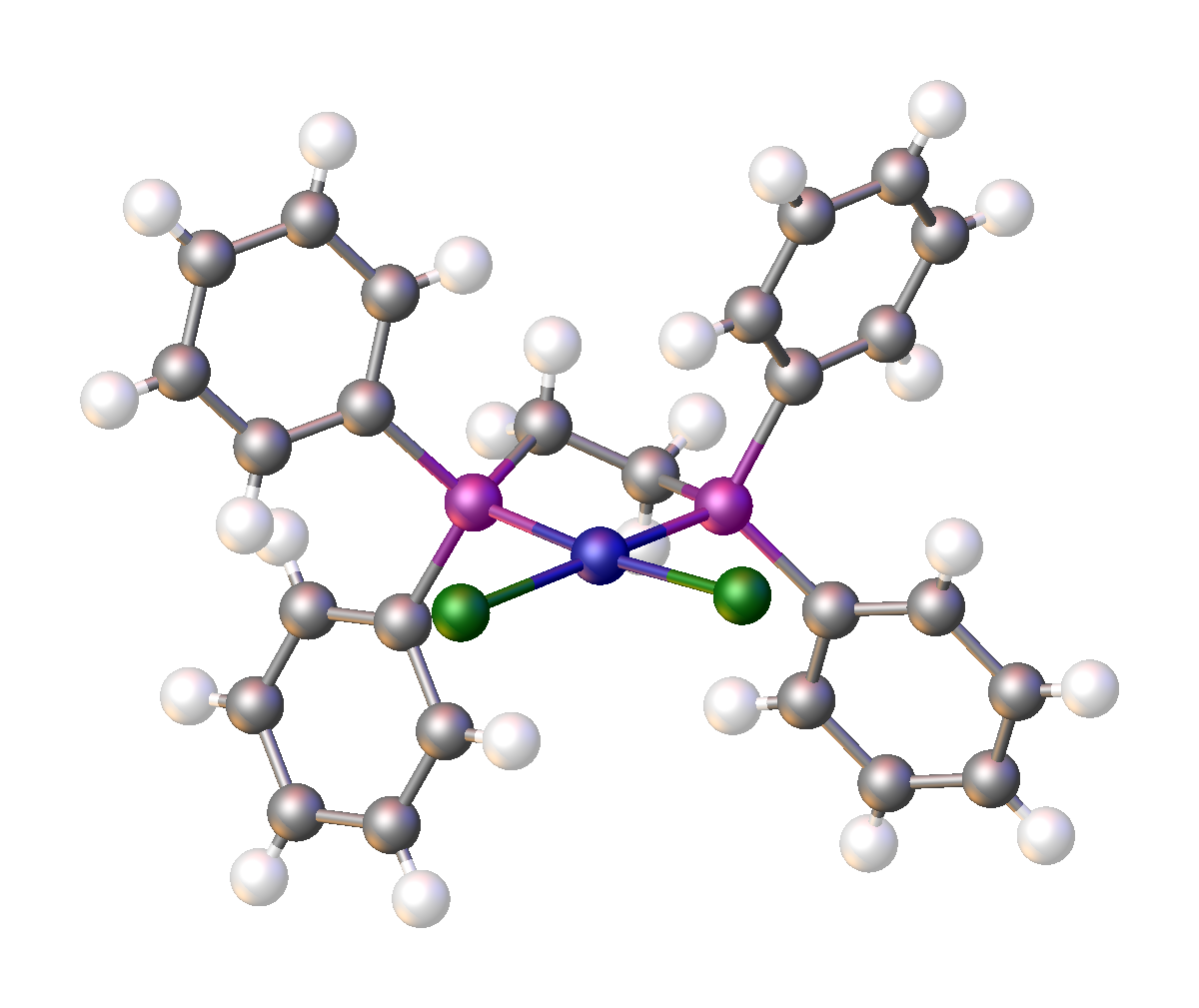

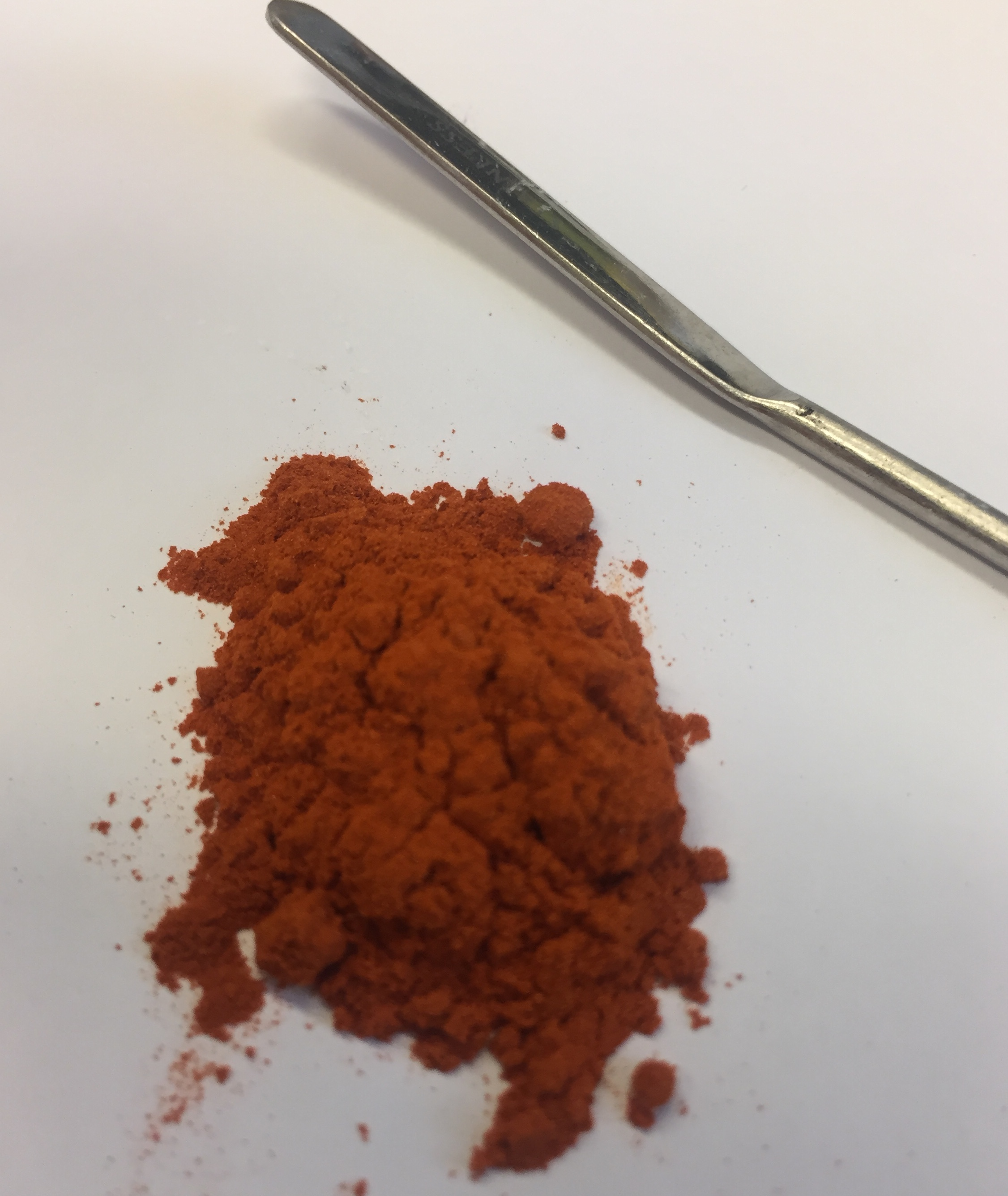

Identifiers
CAS Number	14647-23-5
3D model (JSmol)	Interactive image
ChemSpider	21109306
ECHA InfoCard	100.157.667
PubChem CID	2734542
CompTox Dashboard (EPA)	DTXSID60432121
- InChI: InChI=1S/C26H24P2.2ClH.Ni/c1-5-13-23(14-6-1)27(24-15-7-2-8-16-24)21-22-28(25-17-9-3-10-18-25)26-19-11-4-12-20-26;;;/h1-20H,21-22H2;2*1H;/q;;;+2/p-2 Key: XXECWTBMGGXMKP-UHFFFAOYSA-L
- SMILES: Cl[Ni-2]1(Cl)[P+](c2ccccc2)(c2ccccc2)CC[P+]1(c1ccccc1)c1ccccc1

Properties
Chemical formula	C_{26}H_{24}Cl_{2}NiP_{2}
Molar mass	528.02 g·mol^{−1}
Appearance	orange solid
Density	1.406 g/cm^{3}
- Except where otherwise noted, data are given for materials in their standard state (at 25 °C [77 °F], 100 kPa). Infobox references

Dichloro[1,2-bis(diphenylphosphino)ethane]nickel is a coordination complex with the formula NiCl_{2}(dppe); where dppe is the diphosphine 1,2-bis(diphenylphosphino)ethane. It is used as a reagent and as a catalyst. The compound is a bright orange-red diamagnetic solid. The complex adopts a square planar geometry.

It is prepared by combining equimolar portions of nickel(II) chloride hexahydrate with dppe:

Ni(H_{2}O)_{6}Cl_{2} + dppe → NiCl_{2}(dppe) + 6 H_{2}O

== See also ==
- Dichloro(1,3-bis(diphenylphosphino)propane)nickel
