= Dichlorobis(ethylenediamine)nickel(II) =

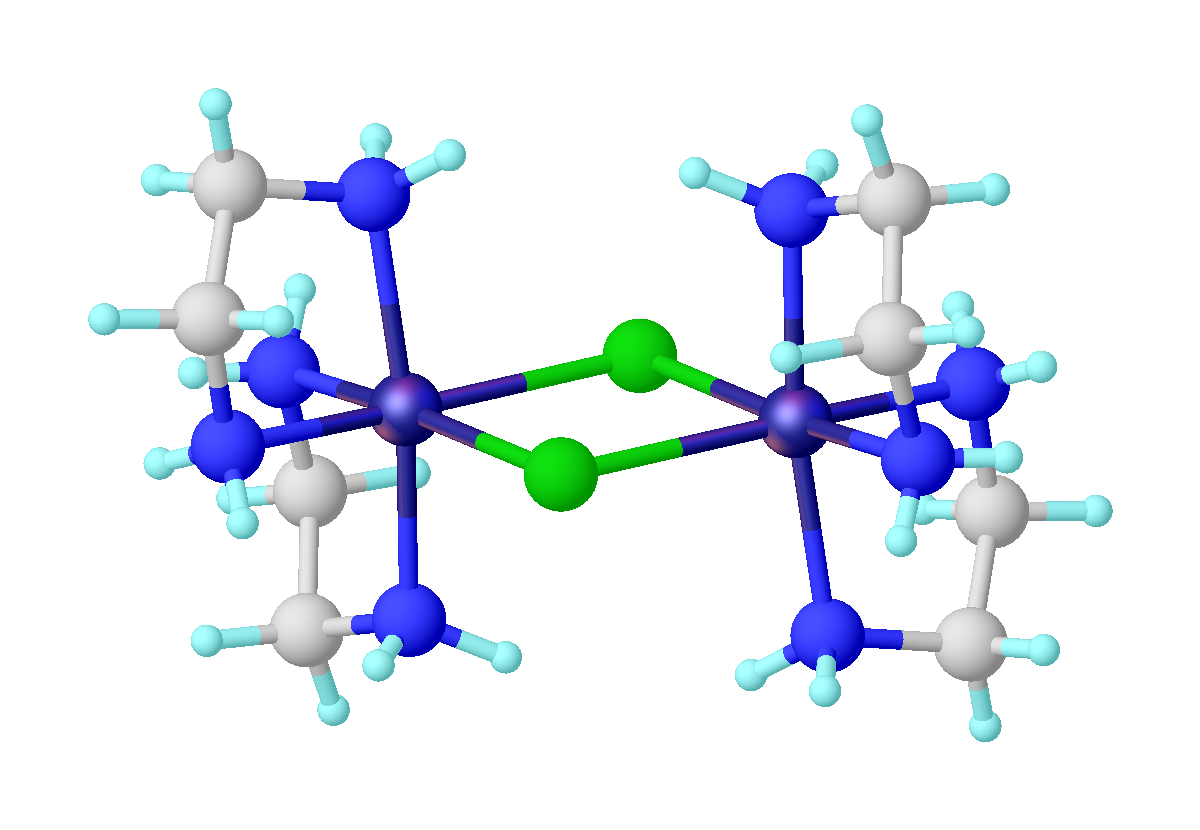

Identifiers
| CAS Number | 20647-35-2 |
| 3D model (JSmol) | Interactive image |
| PubChem CID | 15553566 monomer |
- InChI: InChI=1S/4C2H8N2.4ClH.2Ni/c4*3-1-2-4;;;;;;/h4*1-4H2;4*1H;;/q;;;;;;;;2*+2/p-4 Key: RHOYQZVYDDJOIB-UHFFFAOYSA-J
- SMILES: [Cl-].[Cl+]3[Ni-4]12([NH2+]CC[NH2+]1)([NH2+]CC[NH2+]2)[Cl+][Ni-4]123([NH2+]CC[NH2+]1)[NH2+]CC[NH2+]2.[Cl-]

Properties
| Chemical formula | C_{8}H_{32}Cl_{4}N_{8}Ni_{2} |
| Molar mass | 499.59 g·mol^{−1} |
| Density | 1.66 g/cm^{3} |
| Melting point | > (decomposes) |
- Except where otherwise noted, data are given for materials in their standard state (at 25 °C [77 °F], 100 kPa). Infobox references

Dichlorobis(ethylenediamine)nickel(II) is the inorganic compound with the formula NiCl_{2}(en)_{2}, where en = ethylenediamine. The formula is deceptive: the compound is the chloride salt of the coordination complex [Ni_{2}Cl_{2}(en)_{4}]^{2+}. This blue solid is soluble in water and some polar organic solvents. It is prepared by ligand redistribution from [Ni(en)_{3}]Cl_{2} · 2 H_{2}O and hydrated nickel chloride:

2 [Ni(en)_{3}]Cl_{2} + NiCl_{2} → 3 NiCl_{2}(en)_{2}

The rapid ligand redistribution is characteristic of the kinetic lability of octahedral nickel(II) complexes. In contrast with the lability of [Ni(en)_{3}]Cl^{2+} is the inertness of the isostructural tris(ethylenediamine)cobalt(III) cation.

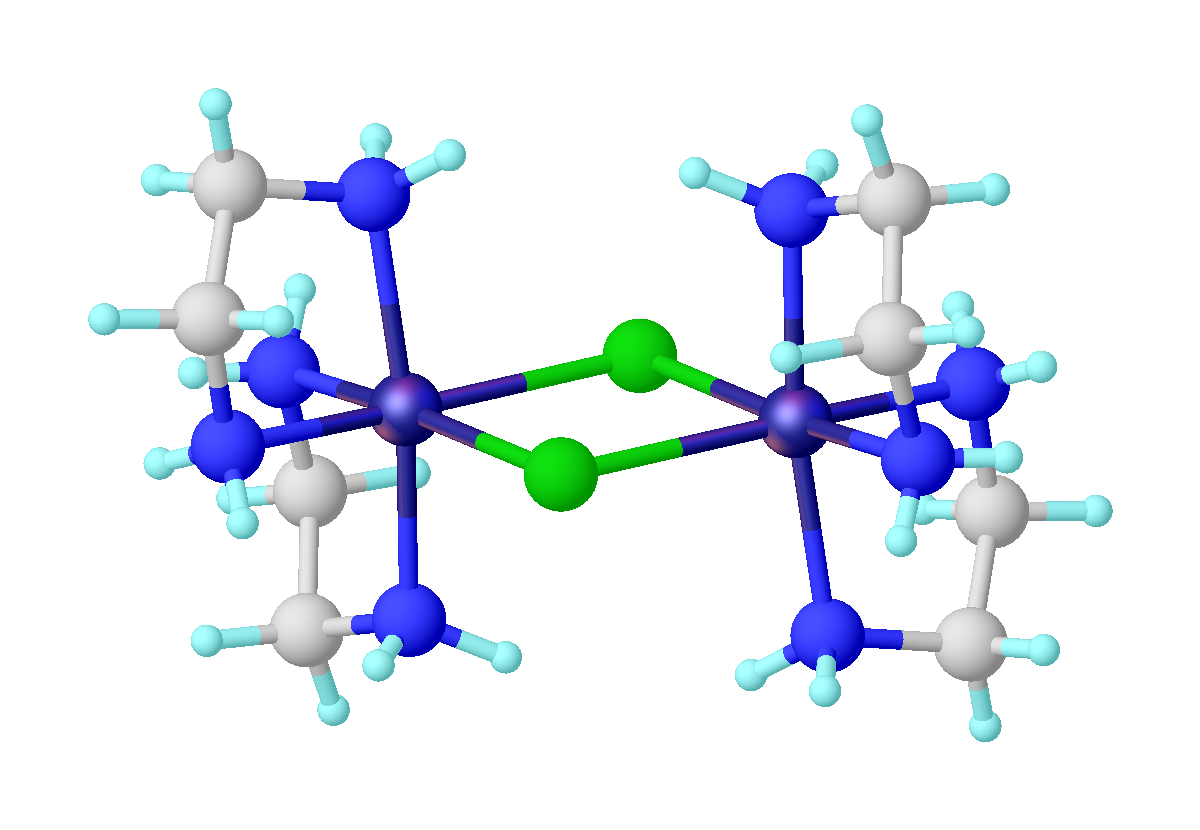
Structure of the dication [Ni_{2}Cl_{2}(en)_{4}]^{2+} that comprises the salt "NiCl_{2}(en)_{2}".
