= Pentaamine(dinitrogen)ruthenium(II) chloride =

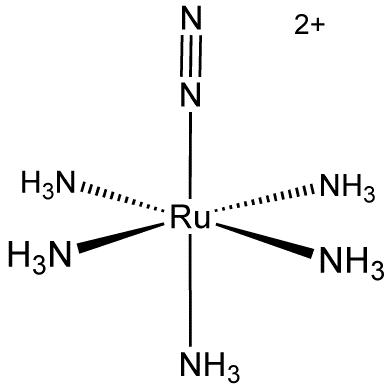

Names
- IUPAC name pentaamminedinitrogenruthenium (II) chloride

Identifiers
CAS Number	15392-92-4
3D model (JSmol)	Interactive image
ChemSpider	129557600
PubChem CID	165365611
CompTox Dashboard (EPA)	DTXSID501045163
- InChI: InChI=1S/2ClH.N2.5H3N.Ru/c;;1-2;;;;;;/h2*1H;;5*1H3;/q;;;;;;;;+2/p-2 Key: VLZPOOHIDLPMKN-UHFFFAOYSA-L
- SMILES: [Cl-].N#[N+][Ru-4]([NH3+])([NH3+])([NH3+])([NH3+])[NH3+].[Cl-]

Properties
Chemical formula	Cl_{2}H_{15}N_{7}Ru
Molar mass	285.14 g·mol^{−1}
Appearance	colorless solid
- Except where otherwise noted, data are given for materials in their standard state (at 25 °C [77 °F], 100 kPa). (what is ?) Infobox references

Pentaamine(dinitrogen)ruthenium(II) chloride is an inorganic compound with the formula [Ru(NH_{3})_{5}(N_{2})]Cl_{2}. It is a nearly white solid, but its solutions are yellow. The cationic complex is of historic significance as the first compound with N_{2} bound to a metal center. [Ru(NH_{3})_{5}(N_{2})]^{2+} adopts an octahedral structure with C_{4v} symmetry.

== Preparation and properties ==
Pentaamine(dinitrogen)ruthenium(II) chloride is synthesized in an aqueous solution from pentaamminechlororuthenium(III) chloride, sodium azide, and methanesulfonic acid:

[Ru(NH_{3})_{5}Cl]Cl_{2} + NaN_{3} → [Ru(NH_{3})_{5}N_{2}]Cl_{2} + ...

If it is to be used in situ, the cation can be made more conveniently from ruthenium(III) chloride and hydrazine hydrate:

RuCl_{3} + 4 N_{2}H_{4} → [Ru(NH_{3})_{5}N_{2}]^{2+} + ...

This N_{2} complex is stable in aqueous solution and has a relatively low ligand exchange rate with water. Being a d^{6} complex, the Ru-N bond is stabilized by the pi backbonding, the donation of metal d-electrons into the N_{2} π* orbitals. The related metal ammine complex [Os(NH_{3})_{5}(N_{2})]^{2+} is also known.

== Reactions ==
The dinitrogen ligand is not reduced by aqueous sodium borohydride. Nearly all known reactions of this compound are displacement reactions. Pentaamine(halogen)ruthenium(II) halides can be synthesized by treating [Ru(NH_{3})_{5}N_{2}]^{2+} with halide sources:

[Ru(NH_{3})_{5}N_{2}]^{2+} + X^{−} → [Ru(NH_{3})_{5}X]^{+} + N_{2}

[Ru(NH_{3})_{5}N_{2}]^{2+} forms the symmetrically bridging symmetrical dinitrogen complex [(NH_{3})_{5}Ru-NN-Ru(NH_{3})_{5}]^{4+}.
