= Chloropentamminecobalt chloride =

Cobalt compound

Pentaamminechlorocobalt(III) chloride

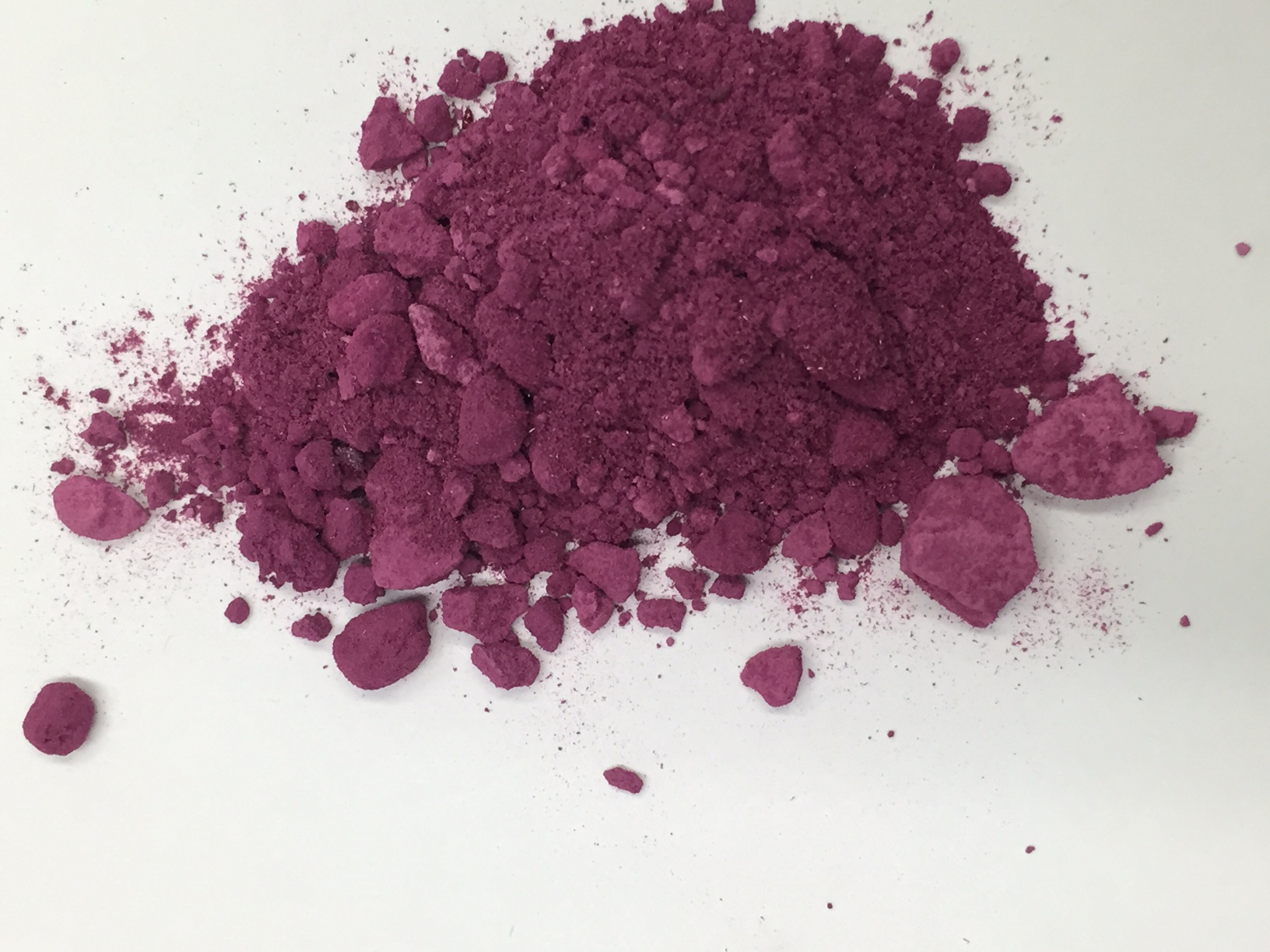

Names
- IUPAC name Pentaamminechloridocobalt(III) chloride
- Other names Pentaamminechlorocobalt(III) chloride

Identifiers
CAS Number	13859-51-3
3D model (JSmol)	Interactive image
ChemSpider	140421
ECHA InfoCard	100.034.163
EC Number	237-594-8
PubChem CID	15771825
CompTox Dashboard (EPA)	DTXSID701030463
- InChI: InChI=1S/3ClH.Co.5H3N/h3*1H;;5*1H3/q;;;+3;;;;;/p-3 Key: NSYALVBBDKTCLE-UHFFFAOYSA-K
- SMILES: [Cl-].Cl[Co-3]([NH3+])([NH3+])([NH3+])([NH3+])[NH3+].[Cl-]

Properties
Chemical formula	[Co(NH_{3})_{5}Cl]Cl_{2}
Molar mass	250.4 g/mol
Appearance	red-violet rhomb-shaped crystal
Density	1.783 g/mL
Boiling point	N/A
Solubility in water	0.4 g/100 mL
Vapor pressure	5990 mm Hg

Thermochemistry
Std enthalpy of formation (Δ_{f}H^{⦵}_{298})	-1037.6 kJ/mol
Gibbs free energy (Δ_{f}G^{⦵})	−606.48 kJ/mol
- Except where otherwise noted, data are given for materials in their standard state (at 25 °C [77 °F], 100 kPa). Infobox references

Chloropentamminecobalt chloride is the dichloride salt of the coordination complex [Co(NH_{3})_{5}Cl]^{2+}. It is a red-violet, diamagnetic, water-soluble salt. The compound has been of academic and historical interest.

== Synthesis and reactions ==
The salt is prepared with a two-step process starting with oxidizing a solution of cobalt (II) chloride and ammonia.

2 CoCl_{2}·6H_{2}O + 10 NH_{3} + 2 HCl + H_{2}O_{2} → 2 [Co(NH_{3})_{5}H_{2}O]Cl_{3} + 12 H_{2}O

This intermediate is then heated to induce coordination of one of the outer sphere chloride ligands:

[Co(NH_{3})_{5}H_{2}O]Cl_{3} → [Co(NH_{3})_{5}Cl]Cl_{2} + H_{2}O

The dication [Co(NH_{3})_{5}Cl]^{2+} has idealized C_{4v} symmetry.

In an aqueous solution, chloropentaamminecobalt(III) chloride reforms aquopentammine complex. With concentrated sulfuric acid, chloropentaamminecobalt(III) chloride forms the hydrogen sulfate complex [Co(NH_{3})_{5}HSO_{4}]^{2+}.

== History ==
Cobalt complexes have been of long-standing interest in inorganic chemistry because they are numerous, easily prepared, and colorful. It was partly on the basis of his study of cobalt coordination chemistry that Alfred Werner was awarded the Nobel Prize in Chemistry. Prior to Werner, the models of amine complexes postulated chains of pentavalent nitrogen centers. This Jørgensen–Bloomstrand model was overthrown by Werner who introduced the idea that coordination complexes feature metal atoms of octahedral and tetrahedral shapes, with ammonia and other ligands attached individually to the metal. Werner's model accounted for the inner sphere ligands being less reactive. In [Co(NH_{3})_{5}Cl]Cl_{2}, two chloride ions are outer sphere (counter ions) and one is bound to the Co(III) center: reaction with excess silver nitrate would immediately precipitate the two chloride counter ions, but the bound chloride ion would not be precipitated.

== Health ==
Also known as CPACC the molecule is investigated in relation with limiting the magnesium available for mitochondria and subsequent metabolic health benefits.

== See also ==
- Pentaamminechlororhodium dichloride
