= Reinecke's salt =

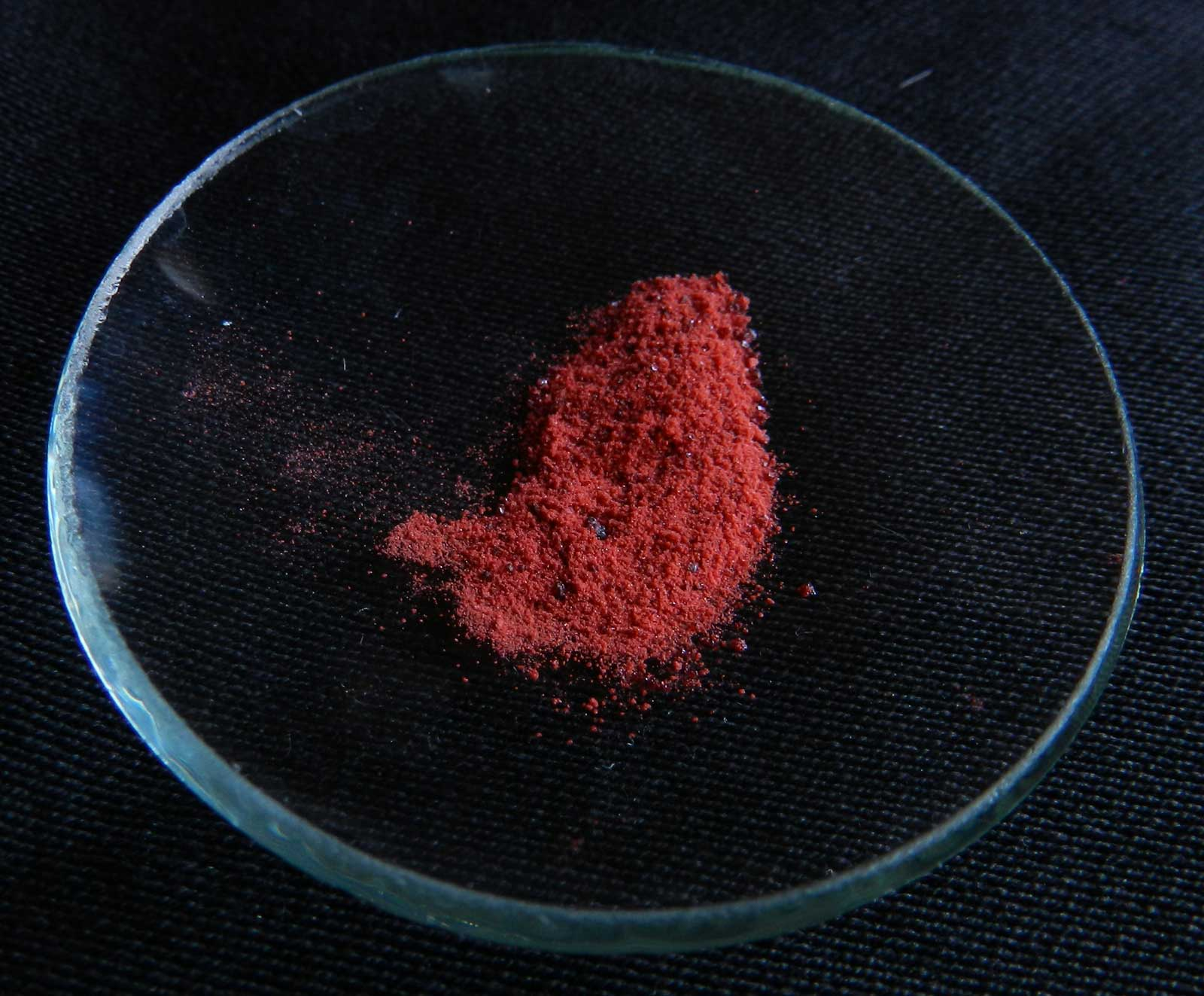

Names
- IUPAC name Ammonium (OC-6-11)-diamminetetrakis(thiocyanato-N)chromate(1−)
- Other names: Ammonium tetrathiocyanato-diamminechromate(III); Reinecke salt; Ammonium reineckate

Identifiers
| CAS Number | 13573-16-5 |
| 3D model (JSmol) | Interactive image |
| ChemSpider | 21106473 |
| ECHA InfoCard | 100.033.625 |
| EC Number | 237-003-3 |
| PubChem CID | 159682 |
| UNII | JL96S212CS |
| CompTox Dashboard (EPA) | DTXSID10894851 |
- InChI: InChI=1S/4CNS.Cr.3H3N.H2O/c4*2-1-3;;;;;/h;;;;;3*1H3;1H2/q4*-1;+3;;;;/p+1 Key: GXUDINOISGOIAV-UHFFFAOYSA-O; InChI=1/4CNS.Cr.3H3N.H2O/c4*2-1-3;;;;;/h;;;;;3*1H3;1H2/q4*-1;+3;;;;/p+1/rC4H6CrN6S4.H3N.H2O/c6-5(7,8-1-12,9-2-13,10-3-14)11-4-15;;/h6-7H3;1H3;1H2/q-1;;/p+1 Key: GXUDINOISGOIAV-JJHXSEQHAU
- SMILES: [NH4+].S=C=N/[Cr-3]([NH3+])([NH3+])(/N=C=S)(/N=C=S)/N=C=S.O

Properties
| Chemical formula | C_{4}H_{12}N_{7}OCrS_{4} |
| Molar mass | 354.42 g/mol |
| Appearance | dark red solid |
| Density | 1.49 g/cm^{3} |
| Melting point | 270 °C (518 °F; 543 K) |
| Boiling point | decomposes |
| Solubility in water | soluble in hot water |

Structure
| Coordination geometry | octahedral |
| Dipole moment | 0 D |

Hazards
- Occupational safety and health (OHS/OSH)
| Main hazards | toxic |
- GHS labelling
| Pictograms | (GHS07: Exclamation mark) (GHS09: Environmental hazard) |
| Signal word | Warning |
| Hazard statements | H302, H312, H332, H410 |
| Precautionary statements | P261, P264, P270, P271, P273, P280, P301+P312, P302+P352, P304+P312, P304+P340, P312, P322, P330, P363, P391, P501 |

Related compounds
| Related compounds | Hexamminecobalt(III) chloride; Potassium thiocyanate; Chromium(III) chloride |
- Except where otherwise noted, data are given for materials in their standard state (at 25 °C [77 °F], 100 kPa). verify (what is ?) Infobox references

Reinecke's salt is an inorganic compound with the formula NH_{4}[Cr(NCS)_{4}(NH_{3})_{2}·H_{2}O. The dark-red crystalline compound is soluble in boiling water, acetone, and ethanol. It can be classified as a metal isothiocyanate complex.

== Structure, preparation, reactions ==
The chromium atom is surrounded by six nitrogen atoms in an octahedral geometry. The NH_{3} ligands are mutually trans and the Cr-NCS groups are linear. The salt crystallizes with one molecule of water.

It was first reported in 1863. NH_{4}[Cr(NCS)_{4}(NH_{3})_{2} is prepared by treatment of molten NH_{4}SCN (melting point around 145–150 °C (293–302 °F)) with (NH_{4})_{2}Cr_{2}O_{7}.

This salt was once widely used to precipitate primary and secondary amines as their ammonium salts. Included in the amines that effectively form crystalline precipitates are those derived from the amino acids, including proline and hydroxyproline. It also reacts with Hg^{+2} compounds, giving a red color or a red precipitate.
