= Pentaamminechlororhodium dichloride =

Names
- Other names Claus' salt, Pentaamminechlororhodium dichloride, chloropentaamminerhodium dichloride, chloropentaamminerhodium chloride, chloropentamminerhodium(III) dichloride, chloropentamminerhodium(III) chloride

Identifiers
CAS Number	13820-95-6
3D model (JSmol)	Interactive image
ChemSpider	62779325
ECHA InfoCard	100.034.082
EC Number	237-505-2
PubChem CID	159699
CompTox Dashboard (EPA)	DTXSID00930015
- InChI: InChI=1S/3ClH.5H3N.Rh/h3*1H;5*1H3;/q;;;;;;;;+3/p-3 Key: ICJGGTVWZZBROS-UHFFFAOYSA-K
- SMILES: [Cl-].Cl[Ru-3]([NH3+])([NH3+])([NH3+])([NH3+])[NH3+].[Cl-]

Properties
Chemical formula	[RhCl(NH_{3})_{5}]Cl_{2}
Appearance	yellow solid

Hazards
- GHS labelling
Pictograms	(GHS07: Exclamation mark)
Signal word	Warning
Hazard statements	H315, H319, H335
Precautionary statements	P261, P264, P271, P280, P302+P352, P304+P340, P305+P351+P338, P312, P321, P332+P313, P337+P313, P362, P403+P233, P405, P501
- Except where otherwise noted, data are given for materials in their standard state (at 25 °C [77 °F], 100 kPa). Infobox references

Pentamminechlororhodium dichloride is the dichloride salt of the coordination complex [RhCl(NH_{3})_{5}]^{2+}. It is a yellow, water-soluble solid. The salt is an intermediate in the purification of rhodium from its ores.

As shown by X-ray crystallography, the salt consists of the octahedral complex [RhCl(NH_{3})_{5}]^{2+} and two chloride counterions. It forms from the reaction of rhodium trichloride and ammonia in ethanol. Two chloride anions are labile, whereas the coordinated chloride ligand is not.

Treatment of [RhCl(NH_{3})_{5}]Cl_{2} with zinc dust in the presence of ammonia gives the hydride complex [RhH(NH_{3})_{5}]^{2+}.

== Related compounds ==
- Chloropentamminecobalt chloride
- Chloropentammineiridium chloride
