= Hexaamminenickel chloride =

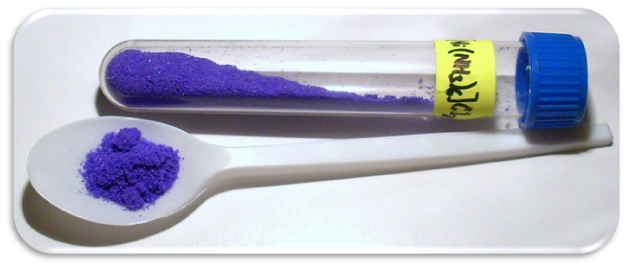

Names
- IUPAC name Hexaamminenickel(II) chloride
- Other names Nickel hexammine chloride, hexamminenickel chloride

Identifiers
CAS Number	10534-88-0
3D model (JSmol)	Interactive image
ChemSpider	11230400
ECHA InfoCard	100.149.740
PubChem CID	22221640
CompTox Dashboard (EPA)	DTXSID20328152
- InChI: InChI=1S/2ClH.6H3N.Ni/h2*1H;6*1H3;/q;;;;;;;;+2/p-2 Key: ZXZMQWZQMZHFOR-UHFFFAOYSA-L
- SMILES: [NH3+][Ni-4]([NH3+])([NH3+])([NH3+])([NH3+])[NH3+].[Cl-].[Cl-]

Properties
Chemical formula	Cl_{2}H_{18}N_{6}Ni
Molar mass	231.78 g·mol^{−1}
Appearance	violet solid
Density	1.51 g/cm^{3}
Melting point	decomposes
Solubility	soluble in NH_{3}

Structure
Coordination geometry	octahedral
Dipole moment	0 D

Related compounds
Other cations	[Cr(NH_{3})_{6}]Cl_{3} [Co(NH_{3})_{6}]Cl_{3}
- Except where otherwise noted, data are given for materials in their standard state (at 25 °C [77 °F], 100 kPa). Infobox references

Hexaamminenickel chloride is the chemical compound with the formula [Ni(NH_{3})_{6}]Cl_{2}. It is the chloride salt of the metal ammine complex [Ni(NH_{3})_{6}]^{2+}. The cation features six ammonia (called ammines in coordination chemistry) ligands attached to the nickel(II) ion.

== Properties and structure ==
[Ni(NH_{3})_{6}]^{2+}, like all octahedral nickel(II) complexes, is paramagnetic with two unpaired electrons localized on each Ni center. [Ni(NH_{3})_{6}]Cl_{2} is prepared by treating aqueous nickel(II) chloride with ammonia. It is useful as a molecular source of anhydrous nickel(II).

== Related compounds ==
One commercial method for extraction of nickel from its sulfide ores involves the sulfate salt of [Ni(NH_{3})_{6}]^{2+}. In this process, the partially purified ore is treated with air and ammonia as described with this simplified equation:

NiS + 2 O_{2} + 6 NH_{3} → [Ni(NH_{3})_{6}]SO_{4}
