= Nickel(II) chloride =

Nickel chloride
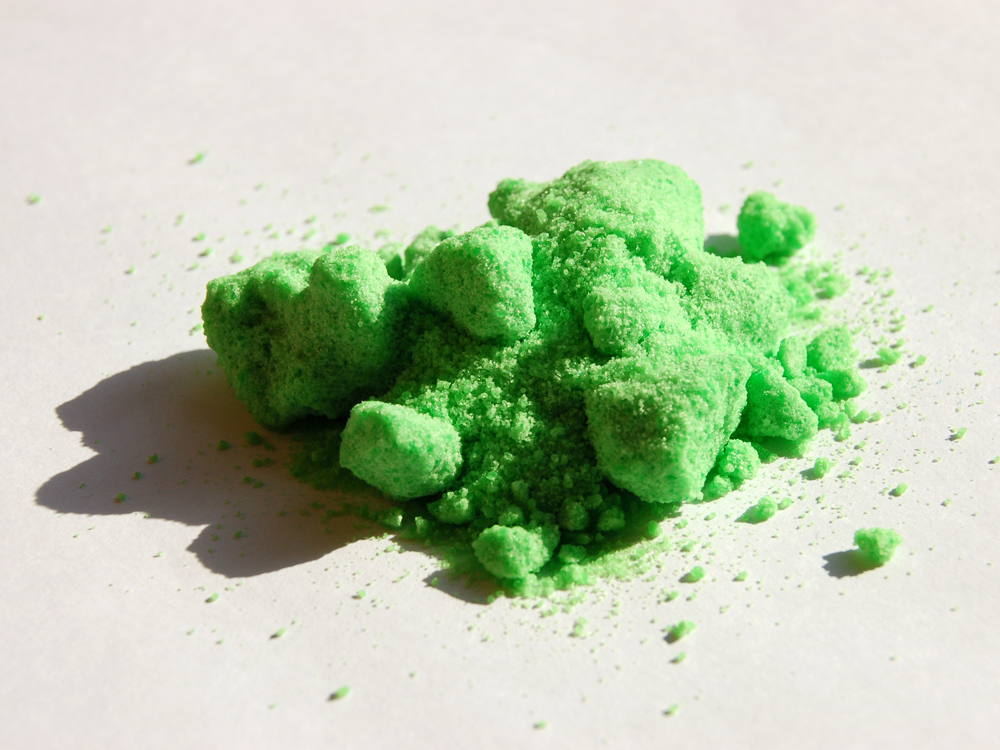
- Nickel(II) chloride hexahydrate Hexahydrate

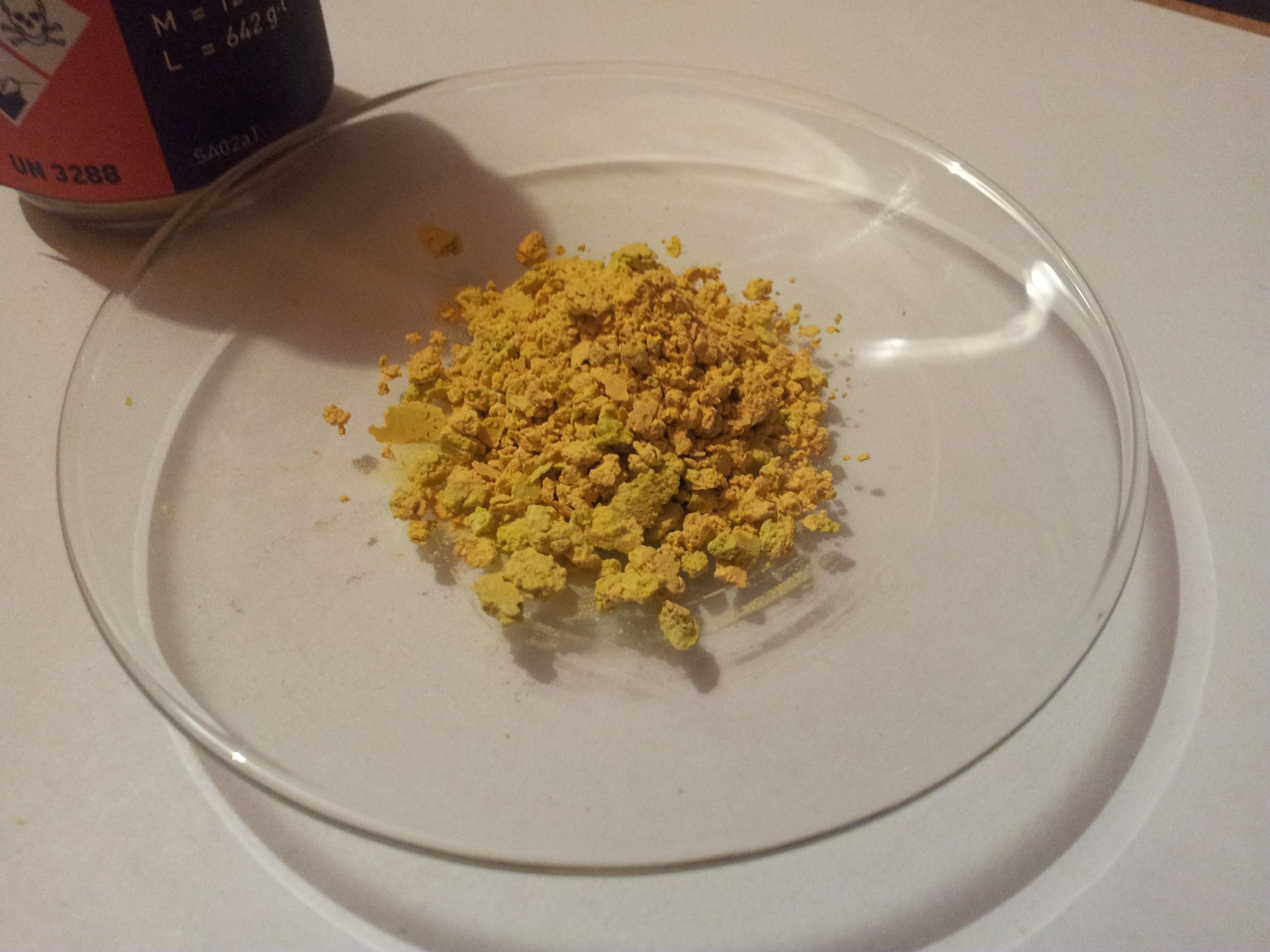
- Anhydrous

Names
- IUPAC name Nickel(II) chloride
- Other names Nickelous chloride, nickel(II) salt of hydrochloric acid

Identifiers
CAS Number	7718-54-9; 7791-20-0 (hexahydrate)
3D model (JSmol)	anhydrous: Interactive image; hexahydrate: Interactive image
ChEBI	CHEBI:34887
ChemSpider	22796
ECHA InfoCard	100.028.858
EC Number	231-743-0
KEGG	C14711
PubChem CID	24385
RTECS number	QR6480000
UNII	696BNE976J; T8365BUD85 (hexahydrate)
UN number	3288 3077
CompTox Dashboard (EPA)	DTXSID7040316
- InChI: InChI=1S/2ClH.Ni/h2*1H;/q;;+2/p-2 Key: QMMRZOWCJAIUJA-UHFFFAOYSA-L; InChI=1/2ClH.Ni/h2*1H;/q;;+2/p-2 Key: QMMRZOWCJAIUJA-NUQVWONBAR
- SMILES: anhydrous: [Ni+2].[Cl-].[Cl-]; hexahydrate: Cl[Ni-4](Cl)([OH2+])([OH2+])([OH2+])[OH2+].O.O

Properties
Chemical formula	NiCl_{2}
Molar mass	129.5994 g/mol (anhydrous); 237.69 g/mol (hexahydrate)
Appearance	yellow-brown crystals deliquescent (anhydrous) green crystals (hexahydrate)
Odor	odorless
Density	3.55 g/cm^{3} (anhydrous); 1.92 g/cm^{3} (hexahydrate)
Melting point	1,001 °C (1,834 °F; 1,274 K) (anhydrous); 140 °C (hexahydrate)
Solubility in water	anhydrous 67.5 g/100 mL (25 °C); 87.6 g/100 mL (100 °C) hexahydrate 282.5 g/100 mL (25 °C); 578.5 g/100 mL (100 °C)
Solubility	0.8 g/100 mL (hydrazine) soluble in ethylene glycol, ethanol, ammonium hydroxide insoluble in ammonia, nitric acid
Acidity (pK_{a})	4 (hexahydrate)
Magnetic susceptibility (χ)	+6145.0·10^{−6} cm^{3}/mol

Structure
Crystal structure	Monoclinic
Coordination geometry	octahedral at Ni

Thermochemistry
Std molar entropy (S^{⦵}_{298})	107 J·mol^{−1}·K^{−1}
Std enthalpy of formation (Δ_{f}H^{⦵}_{298})	−316 kJ·mol^{−1}

Hazards
- Occupational safety and health (OHS/OSH)
Main hazards	Very toxic (T+); Irritant (Xi); Dangerous for the environment (N); Carcinogen
- GHS labelling
Pictograms	(GHS06: Toxic) (GHS08: Health hazard) (GHS09: Environmental hazard)
Signal word	Danger
Hazard statements	H301, H315, H317, H331, H334, H341, H350i, H360D, H372, H410
Precautionary statements	P201, P202, P260, P264, P270, P271, P272, P273, P280, P281, P285, P301+P310, P302+P352, P304+P340, P304+P341, P308+P313, P311, P314, P321, P330, P332+P313, P333+P313, P342+P311, P362, P363, P391, P403+P233, P405, P501
NFPA 704 (fire diamond)	3 0 0
Flash point	Non-flammable
- Lethal dose or concentration (LD, LC)
LD_{50} (median dose)	105 mg/kg (rat, oral)
Safety data sheet (SDS)	Fischer Scientific

Related compounds
Other anions	Nickel(II) fluoride Nickel(II) bromide Nickel(II) iodide
Other cations	Palladium(II) chloride Platinum(II) chloride Platinum(II,IV) chloride Platinum(IV) chloride
Related compounds	Cobalt(II) chloride Copper(II) chloride
- Except where otherwise noted, data are given for materials in their standard state (at 25 °C [77 °F], 100 kPa). verify (what is ?) Infobox references

Nickel(II) chloride (or just nickel chloride) is the chemical compound NiCl_{2}. The anhydrous salt is yellow, but the more familiar hydrate NiCl_{2}·6H_{2}O is green. Nickel(II) chloride, in various forms, is the most important source of nickel for chemical synthesis. The nickel chlorides are deliquescent, absorbing moisture from the air to form a solution. Nickel salts have been shown to be carcinogenic to the lungs and nasal passages in cases of long-term inhalation exposure.

== Production and syntheses ==
Large scale production and uses of nickel chloride are associated with the purification of nickel from its ores. It is generated upon extraction nickel matte and residues obtained from roasting refining nickel-containing ores using hydrochloric acid. Electrolysis of nickel chloride solutions are used in the production of nickel metal. Other significant routes to nickel chloride arise from processing of ore concentrates such as various reactions involving copper chlorides:

NiS + 2 CuCl_{2} → NiCl_{2} + 2 CuCl + S
NiO + 2 HCl → NiCl_{2} + H_{2}O

=== Laboratory routes ===
Nickel chloride is not usually prepared in the laboratory because it is inexpensive and has a long shelf-life. The yellowish dihydrate, NiCl_{2}·2H_{2}O, is produced by heating the hexahydrate between 66 and 133 °C. The hydrates convert to the anhydrous form upon heating in thionyl chloride or by heating under a stream of HCl gas. Simply heating the hydrates does not afford the anhydrous dichloride.

NiCl_{2}·6H_{2}O + 6 SOCl_{2} → NiCl_{2} + 6SO_{2} + 12HCl

The dehydration is accompanied by a color change from green to yellow.

Nickel chloride can also be obtained by cautiously heating hexaamminenickel chloride:

$$\ce{\overset{hexammine\atop nickel~chloride}{[Ni(NH3)6]Cl2} ->[175-200^\circ\ce{C}] NiCl2{} + 6NH3}$$

== Structure of NiCl_{2} and its hydrates ==
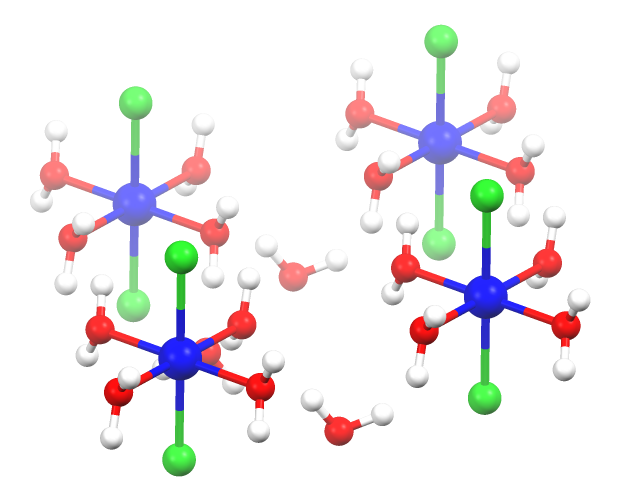
Structure of hydrated nickel chloride based on X-ray crystallography. Color code: red = O, green = Cl

NiCl_{2} adopts the CdCl_{2} structure. In this motif, each Ni^{2+} center is coordinated to six Cl^{−} centers, and each chloride is bonded to three Ni(II) centers. In NiCl_{2} the Ni-Cl bonds have "ionic character". Yellow NiBr_{2} and black NiI_{2} adopt similar structures, but with a different packing of the halides, adopting the CdI_{2} motif.

In contrast, NiCl_{2}·6H_{2}O consists of separated trans-[NiCl_{2}(H_{2}O)_{4}] molecules linked more weakly to adjacent water molecules. Only four of the six water molecules in the formula is bound to the nickel, and the remaining two are water of crystallization, so the formula of nickel(II) chloride hexahydrate is [NiCl_{2}(H_{2}O)_{4}]·2H_{2}O. Cobalt(II) chloride hexahydrate has a similar structure. The hexahydrate occurs in nature as the very rare mineral nickelbischofite.

The dihydrate NiCl_{2}·2H_{2}O adopts a structure intermediate between the hexahydrate and the anhydrous forms. It consists of infinite chains of NiCl_{2}, wherein both chloride centers are bridging ligands. The trans sites on the octahedral centers occupied by aquo ligands. A tetrahydrate NiCl_{2}·4H_{2}O is also known.

== Reactions ==
Nickel(II) chloride solutions are acidic, with a pH of around 4 due to the hydrolysis of the Ni^{2+} ion.

=== Coordination complexes ===
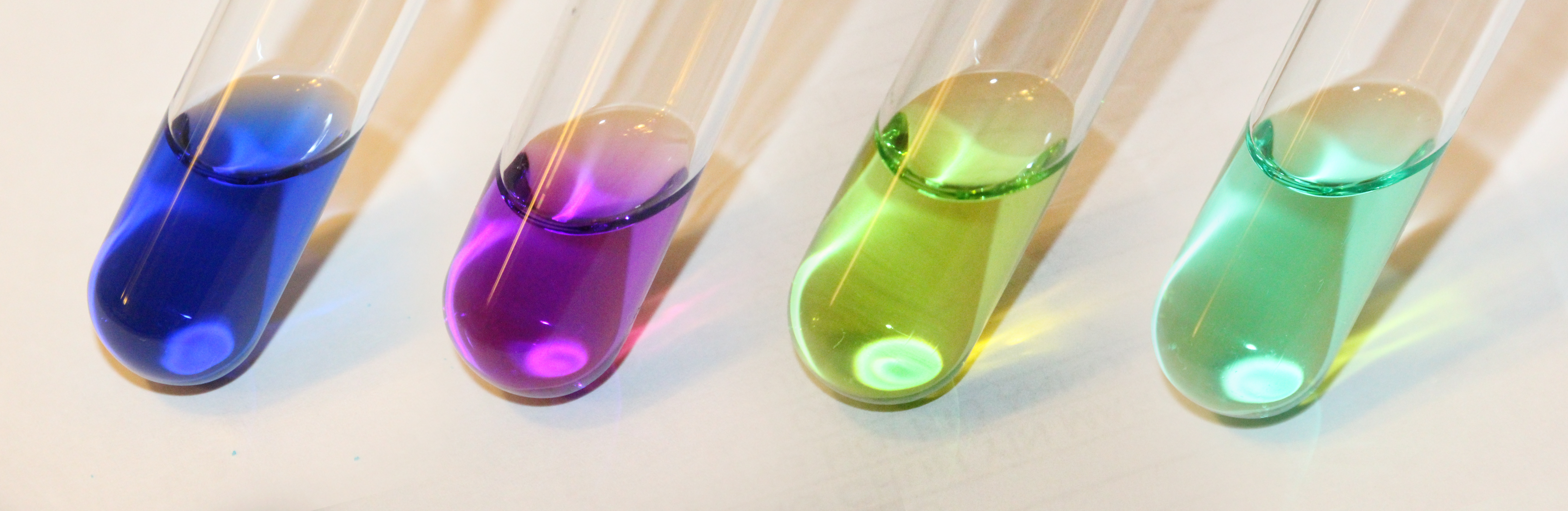
Color of various Ni(II) complexes in aqueous solution. From left to right, [Ni(NH_{3})_{6}]^{2+}, [Ni(en)_{3}]^{2+}, [Ni(H_{2}O)_{5}Cl]^{+}, [Ni(H_{2}O)_{6}]^{2+}

Most of the reactions ascribed to "nickel chloride" involve the hexahydrate, although specialized reactions require the anhydrous form.

Reactions starting from NiCl_{2}·6H_{2}O can be used to form a variety of nickel coordination complexes because the H_{2}O ligands are rapidly displaced by ammonia, amines, thioethers, thiolates, and organophosphines. In some derivatives, the chloride remains within the coordination sphere, whereas chloride is displaced with highly basic ligands. Illustrative complexes include:

Complex	Color	Magnetism	Geometry
[Ni(NH_{3})_{6}]Cl_{2}	blue/violet	paramagnetic	octahedral
[Ni(en)_{3}]^{2+}	violet	paramagnetic	octahedral
NiCl_{2}(dppe)	orange	diamagnetic	square planar
[Ni(CN)_{4}]^{2−}	colorless	diamagnetic	square planar
[NiCl_{4}]^{2−}	blue	paramagnetic	tetrahedral

NiCl_{2} is the precursor to acetylacetonate complexes Ni(acac)_{2}(H_{2}O)_{2} and the benzene-soluble (Ni(acac)_{2})_{3}, which is a precursor to Ni(1,5-cyclooctadiene)_{2}, an important reagent in organonickel chemistry.

In the presence of water scavengers, hydrated nickel(II) chloride reacts with dimethoxyethane (dme) to form the molecular complex NiCl_{2}(dme)_{2}. The dme ligands in this complex are labile.

=== Applications in organic synthesis ===
NiCl_{2} and its hydrate are occasionally useful in organic synthesis.

- As a mild Lewis acid, e.g. for the regioselective isomerization of dienols:

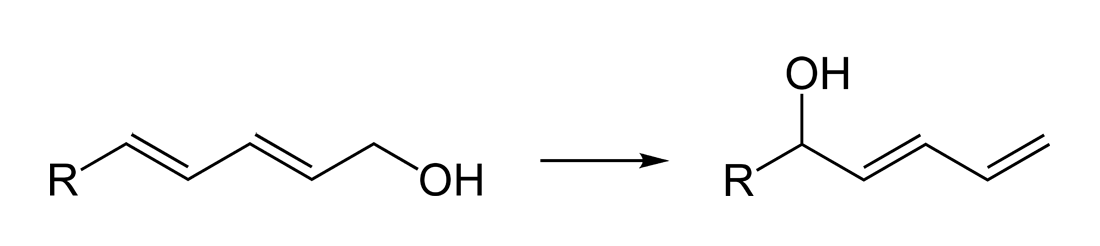

- In combination with CrCl_{2} for the coupling of an aldehyde and a vinylic iodide to give allylic alcohols.
- For selective reductions in the presence of LiAlH_{4}, e.g. for the conversion of alkenes to alkanes.
- As a precursor to Brown's P-1 and P-2 nickel boride catalyst through reaction with NaBH_{4}.
- As a precursor to finely divided Ni by reduction with Zn, for the reduction of aldehydes, alkenes, and nitro aromatic compounds. This reagent also promotes homo-coupling reactions, that is 2RX → R-R where R = aryl, vinyl.
- As a catalyst for making dialkyl arylphosphonates from phosphites and aryl iodide, ArI:

ArI + P(OEt)_{3} → ArP(O)(OEt)_{2} + EtI

NiCl_{2}-dme (or NiCl_{2}-glyme) is used due to its increased solubility in comparison to the hexahydrate.

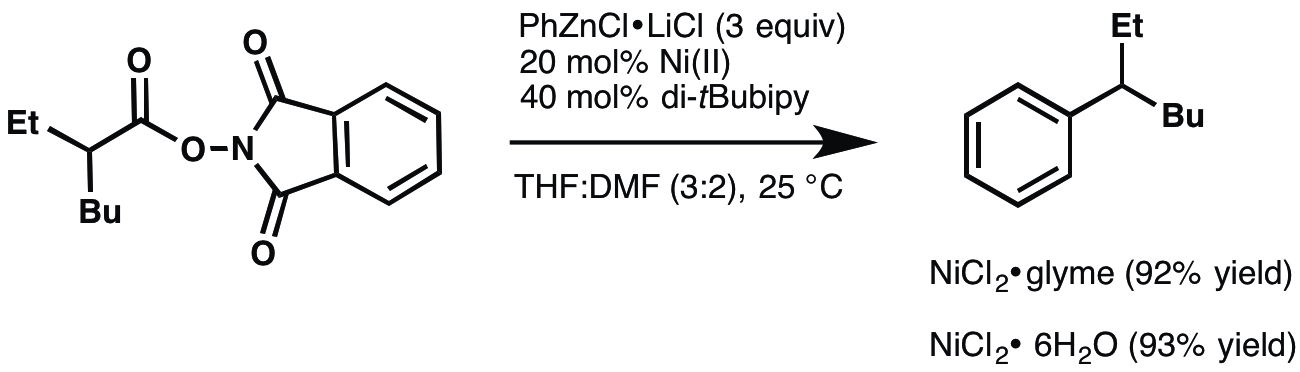
Application of NiCl_{2} precatalyst.

== Safety ==
Nickel(II) chloride is irritating upon ingestion, inhalation, skin contact, and eye contact. Prolonged inhalation exposure to nickel and its compounds has been linked to increased cancer risk to the lungs and nasal passages.
