= Hexaamminecobalt(III) chloride =

- chloride

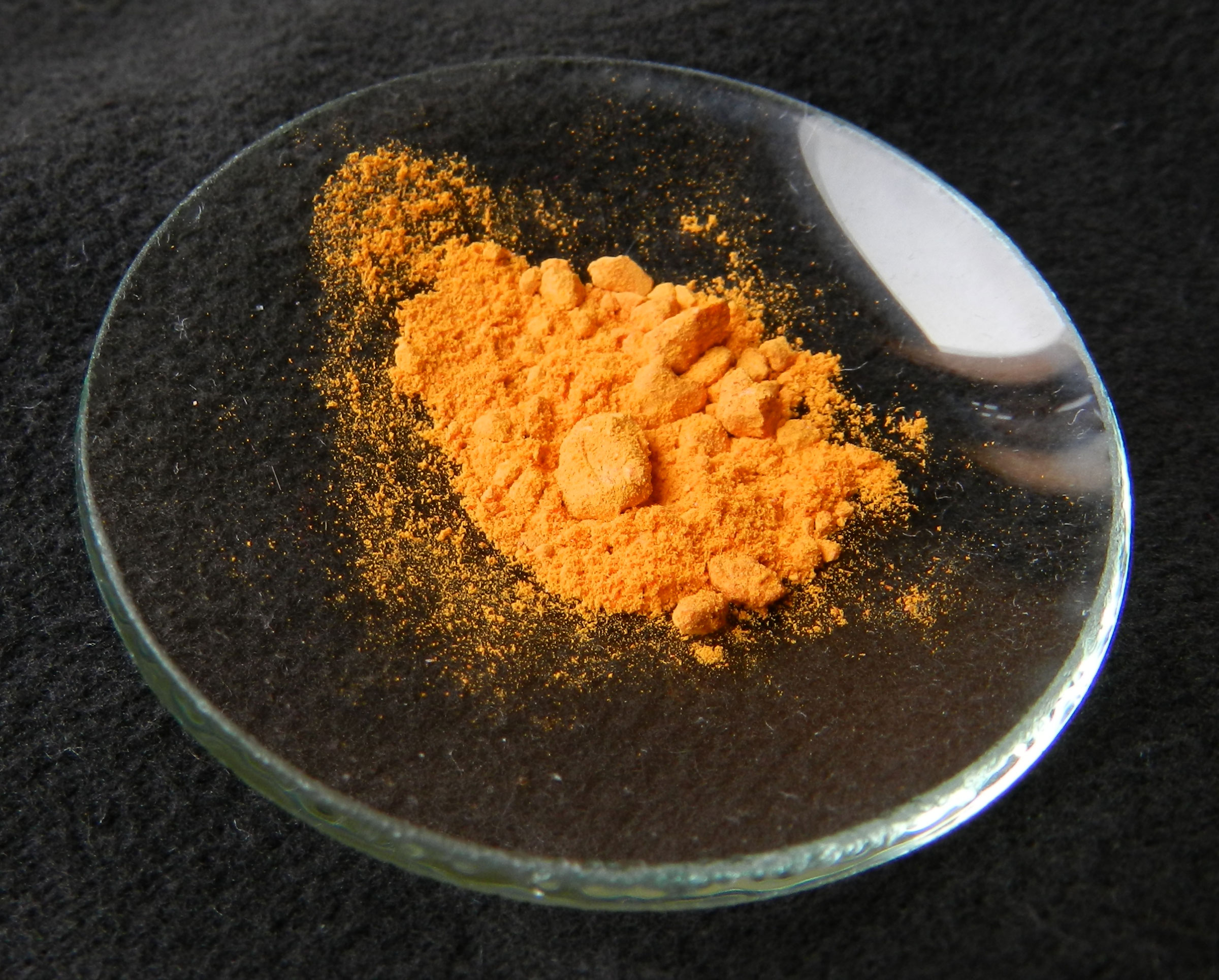

Names
- IUPAC name Hexaamminecobalt(III) chloride
- Other names Cobalt hexammine chloride, hexaamminecobalt(III) chloride

Identifiers
CAS Number	10534-89-1
3D model (JSmol)	Interactive image
ChemSpider	140101
ECHA InfoCard	100.030.991
EC Number	234-103-9
PubChem CID	159295
UNII	240056WZHT
CompTox Dashboard (EPA)	DTXSID1044358
- InChI: InChI=1S/3ClH.Co.6H3N/h3*1H;;6*1H3/q;;;+3;;;;;;/p-3 Key: JXBGZYGSWFSYFI-UHFFFAOYSA-K
- SMILES: [NH3+][Co-3]([NH3+])([NH3+])([NH3+])([NH3+])[NH3+].[Cl-].[Cl-].[Cl-]

Properties
Chemical formula	H_{18}N_{6}Cl_{3}Co
Molar mass	267.48 g/mol
Appearance	yellow or orange crystals
Density	1.71 g/cm^{3},
Melting point	decomposes
Solubility in water	0.26 M (20 °C) tribromide: 0.04 M (18 °C)
Solubility	soluble in NH_{3}

Structure
Coordination geometry	octahedral
Dipole moment	0 D

Hazards
- Occupational safety and health (OHS/OSH)
Main hazards	poison
- GHS labelling
Pictograms	(GHS07: Exclamation mark)
Signal word	Warning
Hazard statements	H315, H319, H335
Precautionary statements	P261, P264, P271, P280, P302+P352, P304+P340, P305+P351+P338, P312, P321, P332+P313, P337+P313, P362, P403+P233, P405, P501

Related compounds
Other anions	[Co(NH_{3})_{6}]Br_{3} [Co(NH_{3})_{6}](OAc)_{3}
Other cations	[Cr(NH_{3})_{6}]Cl_{3} [Ni(NH_{3})_{6}]Cl_{2}
Related compounds	[Co(H_{2}NCH_{2}CH_{2}NH_{2})_{3}]Cl_{3} [Co(NH_{3})_{5}(H_{2}O)]Cl_{3} [Co(NH_{3})_{5}Cl]Cl_{2}
- Except where otherwise noted, data are given for materials in their standard state (at 25 °C [77 °F], 100 kPa). verify (what is ?) Infobox references

Hexaamminecobalt(III) chloride is the chemical compound with the formula [Co(NH_{3})_{6}]Cl_{3}. It is the chloride salt of the coordination complex [Co(NH_{3})_{6}]^{3+}, which is considered an archetypal "Werner complex", named after the pioneer of coordination chemistry, Alfred Werner. The cation itself is a metal ammine complex with six ammonia ligands attached to the cobalt(III) ion.

== Properties and structure ==
[Co(NH_{3})_{6}]^{3+} is diamagnetic, with a low-spin 3d^{6} octahedral Co(III) center. The cation obeys the 18-electron rule and is considered to be a classic example of an exchange inert metal complex. As a manifestation of its inertness, [Co(NH_{3})_{6}]Cl_{3} can be recrystallized unchanged from concentrated hydrochloric acid: the NH_{3} is so tightly bound to the Co(III) centers that it does not dissociate to allow its protonation. In contrast, labile metal ammine complexes, such as [Ni(NH_{3})_{6}]Cl_{2}, react rapidly with acids, reflecting the lability of the Ni(II)–NH_{3} bonds. Upon heating, hexaamminecobalt(III) begins to lose some of its ammine ligands, eventually producing a stronger oxidant.

The chloride ions in [Co(NH_{3})_{6}]Cl_{3} can be exchanged with a variety of other anions such as nitrate, bromide, iodide, sulfamate to afford the corresponding [Co(NH_{3})_{6}]X_{3} derivative. Such salts are orange or bright yellow and display varying degrees of water solubility. The chloride ion can be also exchanged with more complex anions such as the hexathiocyanatochromate(III), yielding a pink compound with formula [Co(NH_{3})_{6}][Cr(SCN)_{6}], or the ferricyanide ion.

== Preparation ==
[Co(NH_{3})_{6}]Cl_{3} is prepared by treating cobalt(II) chloride with ammonia and ammonium chloride followed by oxidation. Oxidants include hydrogen peroxide or oxygen in the presence of charcoal catalyst. This salt appears to have been first reported by Fremy.

The acetate salt can be prepared by aerobic oxidation of cobalt(II) acetate, ammonium acetate, and ammonia in methanol. The acetate salt is highly water-soluble to the level of 1.9 M (20 °C), versus 0.26 M for the trichloride.

== Uses in the laboratory ==
[Co(NH_{3})_{6}]^{3+} is a component of some structural biology methods (especially for DNA or RNA, where positive ions stabilize tertiary structure of the phosphate backbone), to help solve their structures by X-ray crystallography or by nuclear magnetic resonance. In the biological system, the counterions would more probably be Mg^{2+}, but the heavy atoms of cobalt (or sometimes iridium, as in PDB: 2GIS) provide anomalous scattering to solve the phase problem and produce an electron-density map of the structure.

[Co(NH_{3})_{6}]^{3+} is used to investigate DNA. The cation induces the transition of DNA structure from the classical B-form to the Z-form. It is also used in the Hanahan method of preparing chemically competent Escherichia coli for plasmid uptake, although the mechanism by which it enhances DNA entry into the cell is unknown.

== Related compounds ==
- Tris(ethylenediamine)cobalt(III) chloride
