= List of alkali metal oxides =

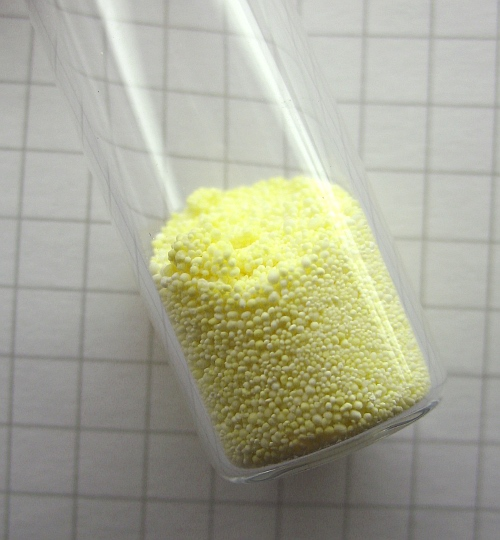
A sample of sodium peroxide.

The alkali metals react with oxygen to form several different compounds: suboxides, oxides, peroxides, sesquioxides, superoxides, and ozonides. They all react violently with water.

== Alkali metal suboxides ==
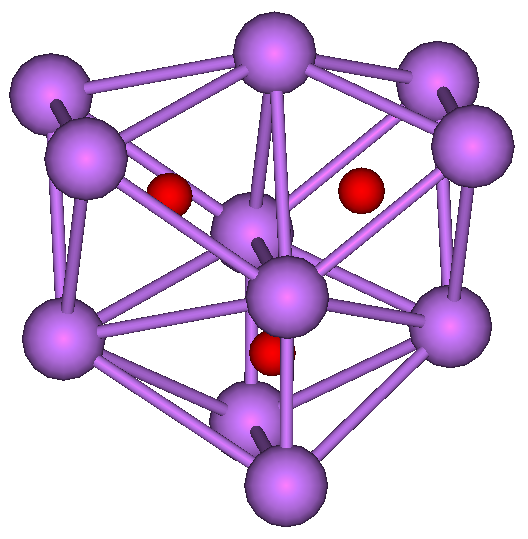
Structure of undecacaesium trioxide.

- Hexarubidium monoxide (Rb_{6}O)
- Nonarubidium dioxide (Rb_{9}O_{2})
- Tricaesium monoxide (Cs_{3}O) is a dark green solid.
- Tetracaesium monoxide (Cs_{4}O)
- Heptacaesium monoxide (Cs_{7}O)
- Tricaesium dioxide (Cs_{3}O_{2})
- Heptacaesium dioxide (Cs_{7}O_{2})
- Undecacaesium trioxide (Cs_{11}O_{3})
- Undecacaesium monorubidium trioxide (Cs_{11}RbO_{3})
- Undecacaesium dirubidium trioxide (Cs_{11}Rb_{2}O_{3})
- Undecacaesium trirubidium trioxide (Cs_{11}Rb_{3}O_{3})

== Alkali metal oxides ==
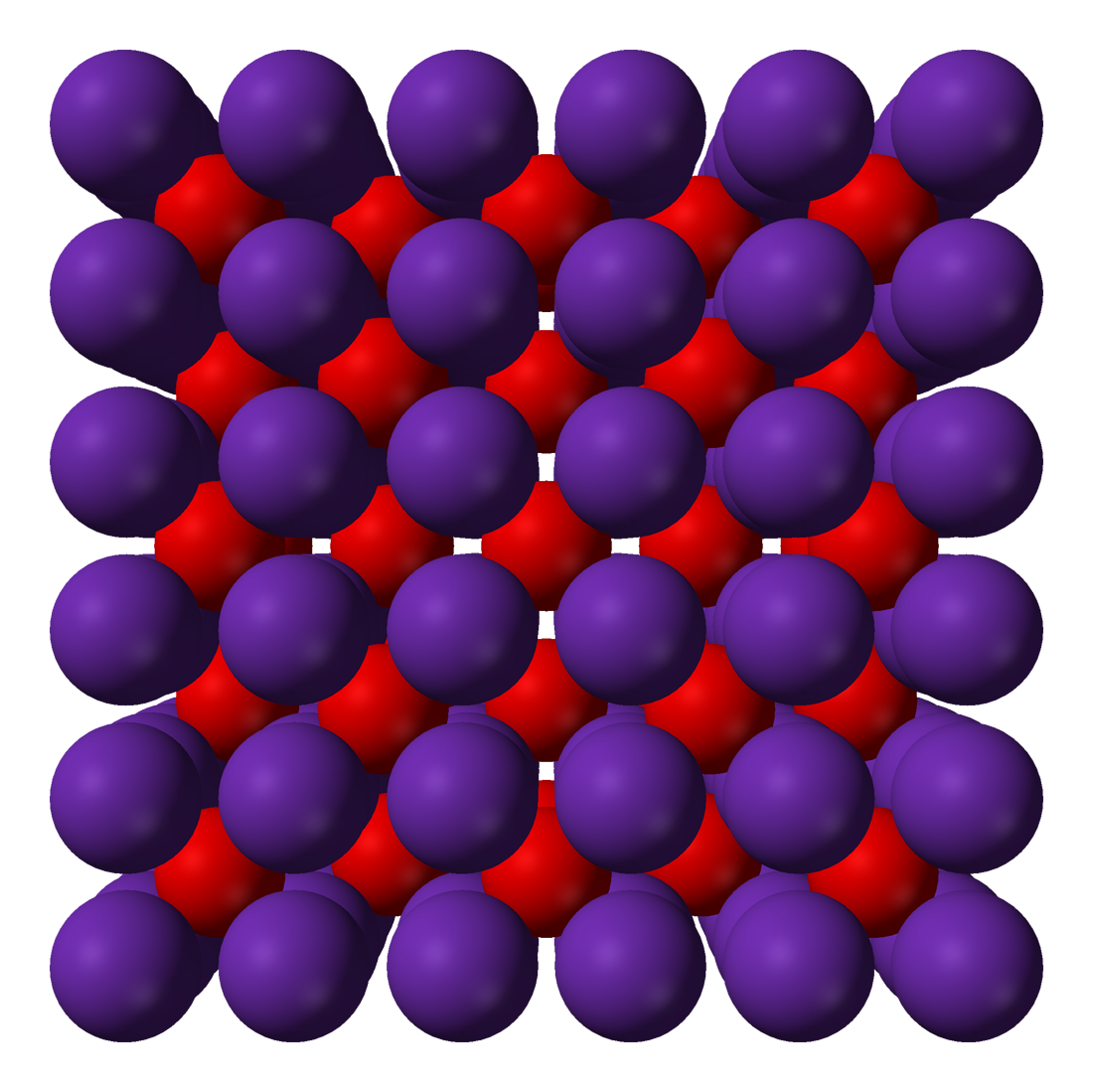
Crystal structure of rubidium oxide.

- Lithium oxide (Li_{2}O) is the lightest alkali metal oxide and a white solid. It melts at 1570 °C.
- Sodium oxide (Na_{2}O) is a white solid that melts at 1132 °C and decomposes at 1950 °C. It is a component of glass.
- Potassium oxide (K_{2}O) is a pale yellow solid that decomposes at 350 °C.
- Rubidium oxide (Rb_{2}O) is a yellow solid that melts at 500 °C.
- Caesium oxide (Cs_{2}O) is a yellow-orange solid that melts at 490 °C.

== Alkali metal peroxides ==
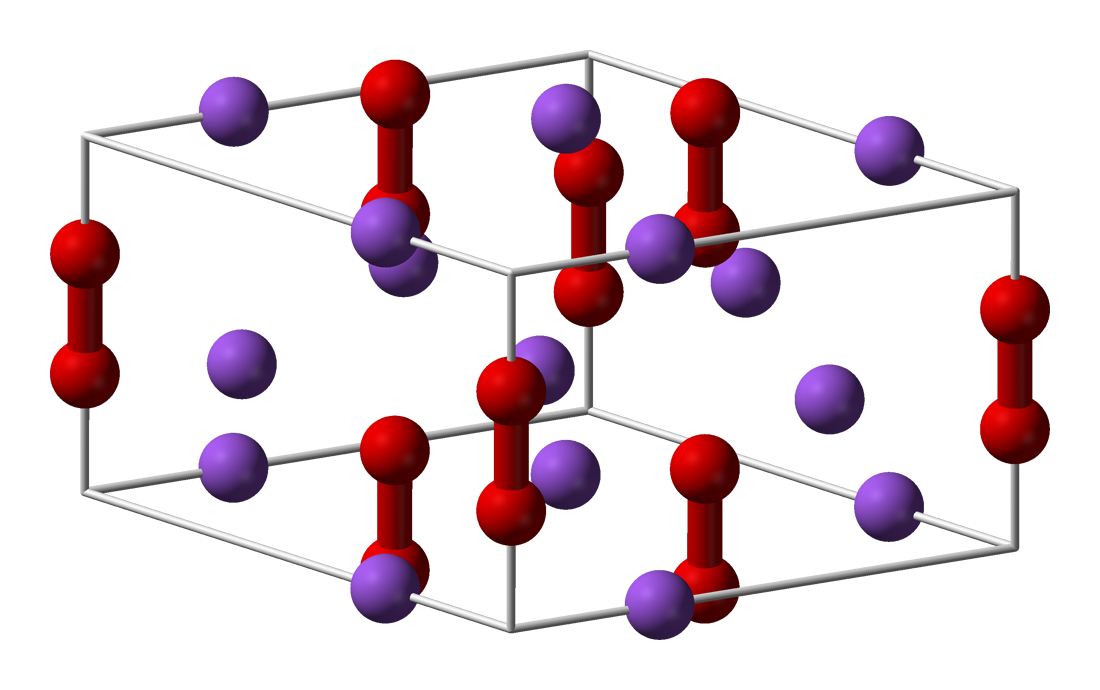
Crystal structure of sodium peroxide.

- Lithium peroxide (Li_{2}O_{2}) is a white solid that melts at 195 °C. It reacts with carbon dioxide to form lithium carbonate and oxygen.
- Sodium peroxide (Na_{2}O_{2}) is a pale yellow solid that melts at 460 °C and decomposes at 657 °C.
- Potassium peroxide (K_{2}O_{2}) is a yellow solid that melts at 490 °C.
- Rubidium peroxide (Rb_{2}O_{2}) is produced when rubidium stands in air.
- Caesium peroxide (Cs_{2}O_{2}) is produced by the decomposition of caesium oxide above 400 °C.

== Alkali metal sesquioxides ==
- Rubidium sesquioxide (Rb_{4}O_{6}) is a black solid.
- Caesium sesquioxide (Cs_{4}O_{6}) is a black solid.

== Alkali metal superoxides ==
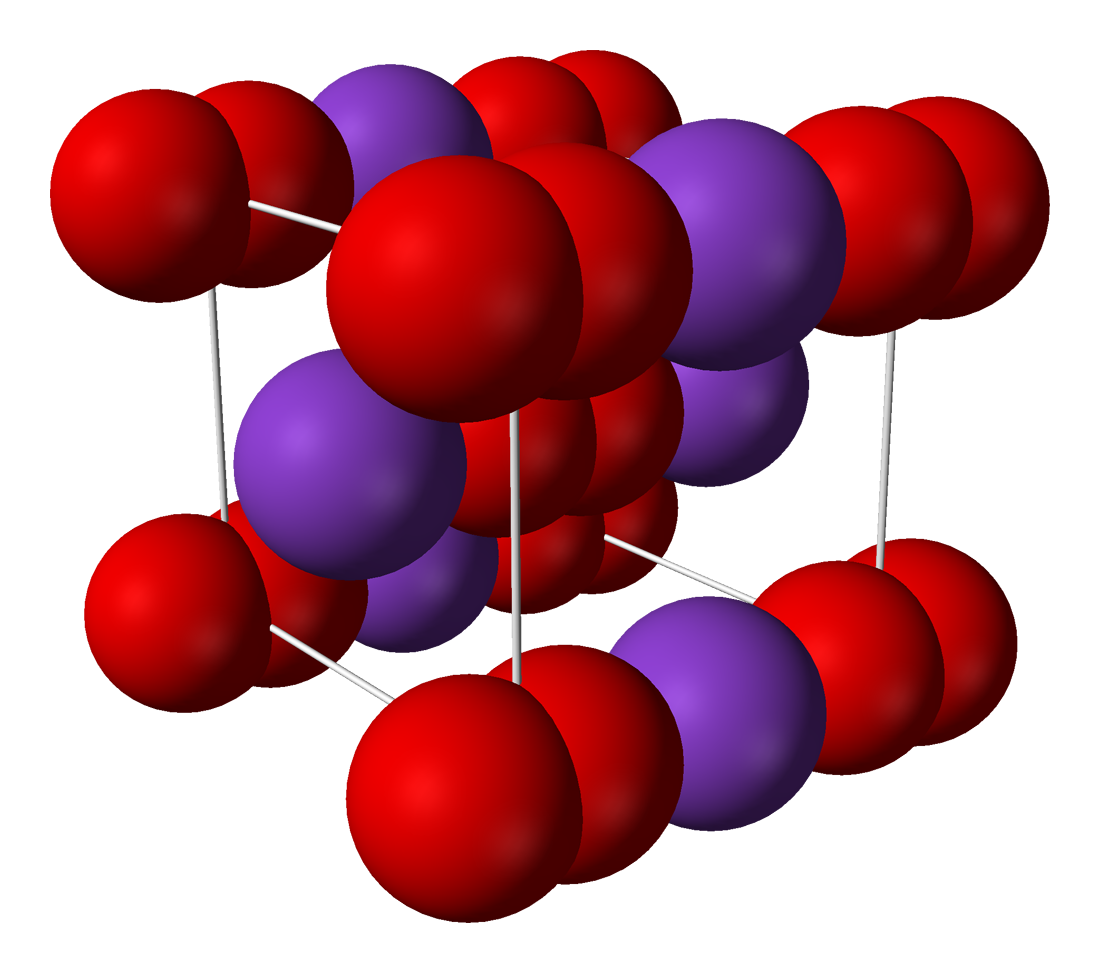
Crystal structure of potassium superoxide.

- Lithium superoxide (LiO_{2}) has only been isolated in matrix isolation at 15 K.
- Sodium superoxide (NaO_{2}) is a yellow-orange solid that melts at 551.7 °C. It is made by the high-pressure oxidation of sodium peroxide.
- Potassium superoxide (KO_{2}) is a yellow solid that decomposes at 560 °C. It is used as a CO_{2} scrubber, H_{2}O dehumidifier, and O_{2} generator in rebreathers, spacecraft, submarines, and spacesuit life support systems.
- Rubidium superoxide (RbO_{2}) is produced when rubidium burns in air.
- Caesium superoxide (CsO_{2}) is produced when caesium burns in air.

== Alkali metal ozonides ==
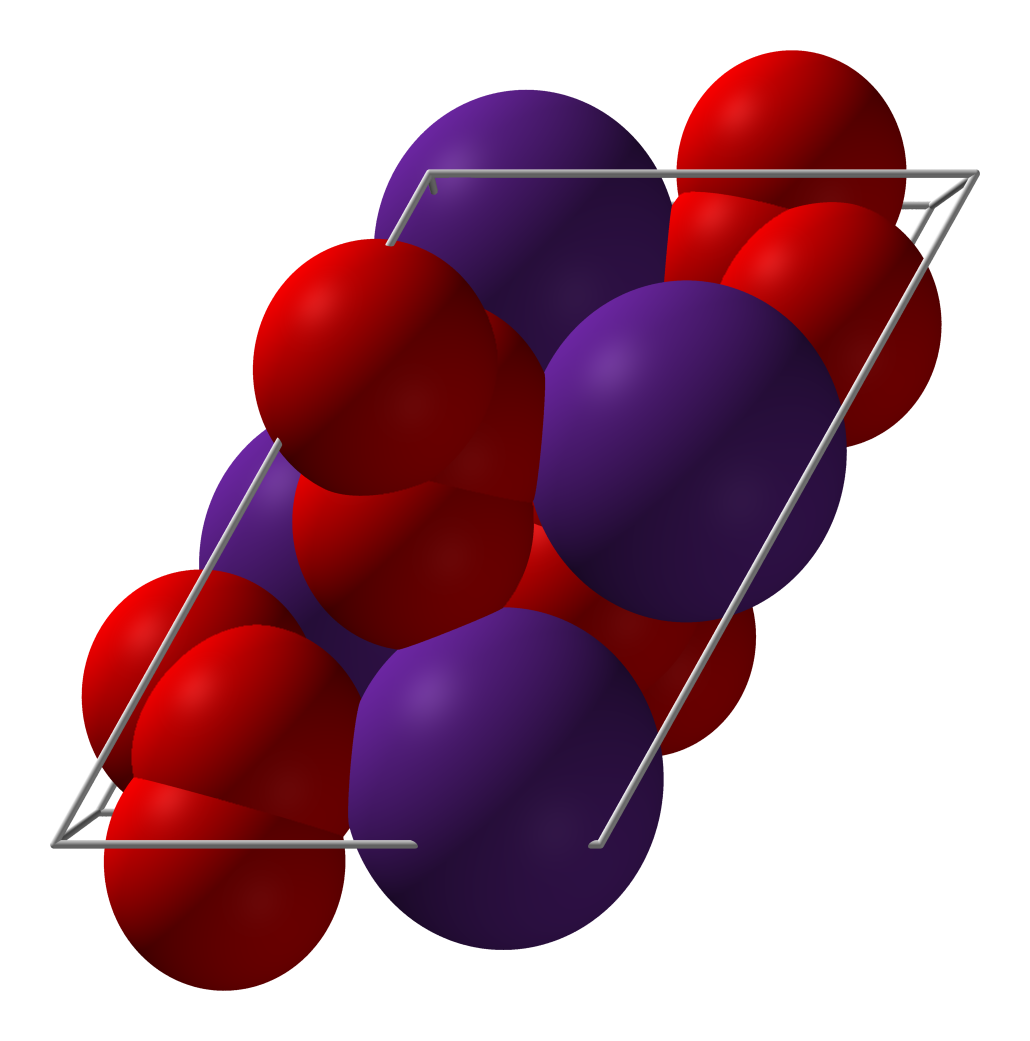
Crystal structure of caesium ozonide.

- Lithium ozonide (LiO_{3}) is a red solid which is produced from caesium ozonide via an ion-exchange process.
- Sodium ozonide (NaO_{3}) is a red solid which is produced from caesium ozonide via an ion-exchange process.
- Potassium ozonide (KO_{3}) is a dark red solid which is produced when potassium is burned in ozone or exposed to air for years.
- Rubidium ozonide (RbO_{3}) is a dark red solid which is produced when rubidium is burned in ozone.
- Caesium ozonide (CsO_{3}) is a dark red solid which is produced when caesium is burned in ozone.
