= Caesium monoxide =

Caesium oxide
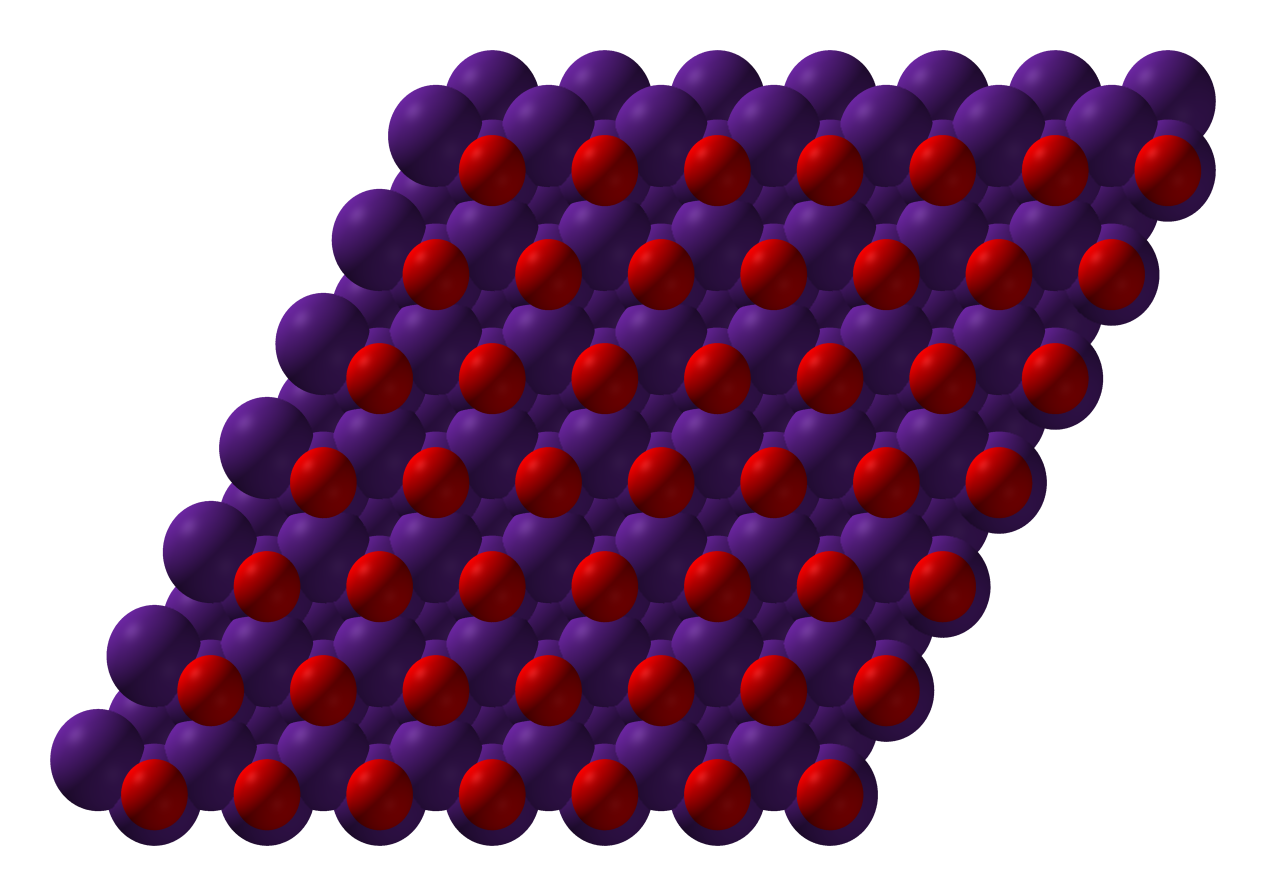
- Caesium oxide Caesium cations, Cs^{+} Oxide anions, O^{2−}

Names
- IUPAC name Caesium oxide
- Other names Cesium oxide (US)

Identifiers
CAS Number	20281-00-9
3D model (JSmol)	Interactive image
ChemSpider	8079519
ECHA InfoCard	100.039.693
EC Number	243-679-0
PubChem CID	9903865
- InChI: InChI=1S/2Cs.O/q2*+1;-2 Key: KOPBYBDAPCDYFK-UHFFFAOYSA-N; InChI=1/2Cs.O/q2*+1;-2 Key: KOPBYBDAPCDYFK-UHFFFAOYAW
- SMILES: [Cs+].[Cs+].[O-2]

Properties
Chemical formula	Cs_{2}O
Molar mass	281.810 g·mol^{−1}
Appearance	Yellow-orange solid
Density	4.65 g/cm^{3}, solid
Melting point	490 °C (914 °F; 763 K) (under N_{2})
Solubility in water	Reacts to form CsOH
Magnetic susceptibility (χ)	1534.0·10^{−6} cm^{3}/mol

Structure
Crystal structure	anti-CdCl_{2} (hexagonal)

Thermochemistry
Heat capacity (C)	76.0 J/(K·mol)
Std molar entropy (S^{⦵}_{298})	146.9 J/(K·mol)
Std enthalpy of formation (Δ_{f}H^{⦵}_{298})	−345.8 kJ/mol

Hazards
- Occupational safety and health (OHS/OSH)
Main hazards	Corrosive and Superbase
- GHS labelling
Pictograms	(GHS05: Corrosive) (GHS08: Health hazard)
NFPA 704 (fire diamond)	3 0 2 W
Flash point	non-flammable

Related compounds
Other anions	Caesium sulfide; Caesium selenide; Caesium telluride; Caesium polonide
Other cations	Lithium oxide; Sodium oxide; Potassium oxide; Rubidium oxide
Related caesium oxides	Caesium suboxide; Caesium peroxide; Caesium sesquioxide; Caesium superoxide; Caesium ozonide
Related compounds	Caesium hydroxide
- Except where otherwise noted, data are given for materials in their standard state (at 25 °C [77 °F], 100 kPa). verify (what is ?) Infobox references

Caesium monoxide or caesium oxide is a chemical compound with the chemical formula Cs_{2}O. It is the simplest and most common oxide of caesium. It forms yellow-orange hexagonal crystals.

== Uses ==
Caesium oxide is used in photocathodes to detect infrared signals in devices such as image intensifiers, vacuum photodiodes, photomultipliers, and TV camera tubes L. R. Koller described the first modern photoemissive surface in 1929–1930 as a layer of caesium on a layer of caesium oxide on a layer of silver. It is a good electron emitter; however, its high vapor pressure limits its usefulness.

== Reactions ==
Elemental magnesium reduces caesium oxide to elemental caesium, forming magnesium oxide as a side-product:

Cs_{2}O + Mg → 2 Cs + MgO

Cs_{2}O is hygroscopic, forming the corrosive CsOH on contact with water.
