= Tetramethylammonium ozonide =

Names
- IUPAC name Tetramethylammonium ozonide

Identifiers
| CAS Number | 78657-29-1 |
| 3D model (JSmol) | Interactive image |
- InChI: InChI=1S/C4H12N.HO3/c1-5(2,3)4;1-3-2/h1-4H3;1H/q+1;/p-1 Key: ANSRPZDTFLHQDZ-UHFFFAOYSA-M
- SMILES: C[N+](C)(C)C.[O-]O[O]

Properties
| Chemical formula | [(CH_{3})_{4}N][O_{3}] |
| Molar mass | 122.14 g/mol^{−1} |
| Appearance | transparent red crystals |
| Melting point | 75 °C (167 °F; 348 K) (decomposition) |

Related compounds
| Other cations | Ammonium ozonide; Potassium ozonide; Caesium ozonide |
- Except where otherwise noted, data are given for materials in their standard state (at 25 °C [77 °F], 100 kPa). Infobox references

Tetramethylammonium ozonide is an oxygen rich compound with the chemical formula [(CH_{3})_{4}N]O_{3}. It consists of tetramethylammonium cations ([(CH_{3})_{4}N]^{+}) and ozonide anions (O^{−}_{3}). The compound is a free radical with one unpaired electron.

It can be created through the metathesis reaction with caesium ozonide (CsO_{3}) in a liquid ammonia solution.

CsO_{3} + [(CH_{3})_{4}N][O_{2}] → CsO_{2} + [(CH_{3})_{4}N][O_{3}]

Tetramethylammonium ozonide was found to be stable; it forms into transparent red crystals, and only decomposes above 75 °C.
