= Lithium ozonide =

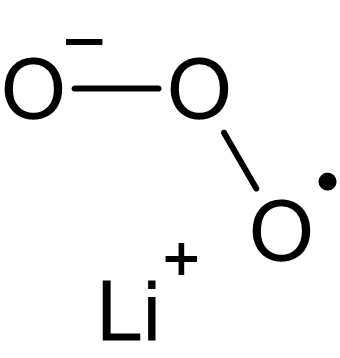

Names
- IUPAC name Lithium ozonide

Identifiers
CAS Number	12162-89-9
3D model (JSmol)	Interactive image
- InChI: InChI=1S/Li.HO3/c;1-3-2/h;1H/q+1;/p-1 Key: UVIRAESCTFSTPA-UHFFFAOYSA-M
- SMILES: [Li+].[O-]O[O]

Properties
Chemical formula	LiO_{3}
Molar mass	54.94 g·mol^{−1}
Appearance	red solid

Related compounds
Other anions	Lithium fluoride; Lithium chloride; Lithium bromide; Lithium iodide
Other cations	Sodium ozonide; Potassium ozonide; Rubidium ozonide; Caesium ozonide
Related lithium oxides	Lithium oxide; Lithium peroxide; Lithium superoxide
- Except where otherwise noted, data are given for materials in their standard state (at 25 °C [77 °F], 100 kPa). Infobox references

Lithium ozonide is an oxygen rich compound of lithium. It has formula LiO_{3}. It is a red solid. It is an ozonide, meaning it contains the ozonide anion (O_{3}^{−}).

Concentrated solutions of lithium ozonide have been prepared in anhydrous liquid ammonia, through the use of an ion exchange reaction beginning with caesium ozonide. Lithium ozonide is the most soluble of the alkali metal ozonides in liquid ammonia.

Lithium ozonide shows a visible spectrum characteristic compared to the ozonides of other alkali metals. The maximum visible spectrum characteristic appears at 450 μm. The heat of formation for the tetraammoniate of lithium ozonide was found to be -135 ± 5 kcal/mol. Complete active space self-consistent field (CASSCF) methods have been used to calculate the harmonic and fundamental frequencies of lithium ozonide.
