= Magnesium ozonide =

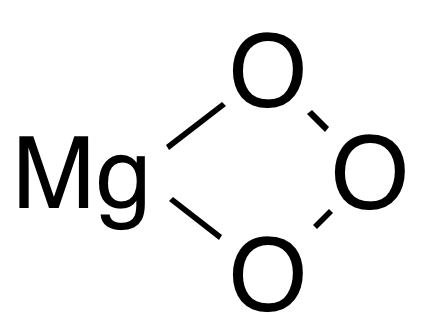

Identifiers
CAS Number	63172-13-4 (MgO_{3}); (Mg(O_{3})_{2}): 1252008-65-3
3D model (JSmol)	Interactive image; Interactive image; (Mg(O_{3})_{2}): Interactive image
PubChem CID	18673469; (Mg(O_{3})_{2}): 161960612
- InChI: InChI=1S/Mg.H2O3/c;1-3-2/h;1-2H/q+2;/p-2 Key: LMFHOIDEQKLFKI-UHFFFAOYSA-L; InChI=1S/Mg.HO3/c;1-3-2/h;1H/q+1;/p-1 Key: RBFCWJLHCQDAGO-UHFFFAOYSA-M; (Mg(O_{3})_{2}): InChI=1S/Mg.H2O6/c;1-3-5-6-4-2/h;1-2H/q+2;/p-2 Key: YNAZEDCTBGQCLV-UHFFFAOYSA-L
- SMILES: [O-]O[O-].[Mg+2]; [Mg+].[O-]O[O]; (Mg(O_{3})_{2}): [O-]OOOO[O-].[Mg+2]

Properties
Chemical formula	MgO_{3}
Molar mass	72.302 g·mol^{−1}
Appearance	White solid

Related compounds
Other cations	Potassium ozonide, Ammonium ozonide
Related compounds	Magnesium oxide
- Except where otherwise noted, data are given for materials in their standard state (at 25 °C [77 °F], 100 kPa). Infobox references

Magnesium ozonide is a compound with the formula MgO_{3}. Much like other ozonides, it is only stable at low temperatures. Unlike other ozonide compounds, magnesium ozonide is white rather than the typical red colour.

== Preparation ==
Magnesium ozonide can be made by passing a dilute mixture of ozone in liquid nitrogen and over magnesium at -259 °C:

O_{3} + Mg → MgO_{3}

== Magnesium bisozonide ==
Magnesium is also known to form bisozonide complexes, containing Mg(O_{3})_{2} complexed with argon or carbon monoxide, in an argon matrix.
