= Rubidium ozonide =

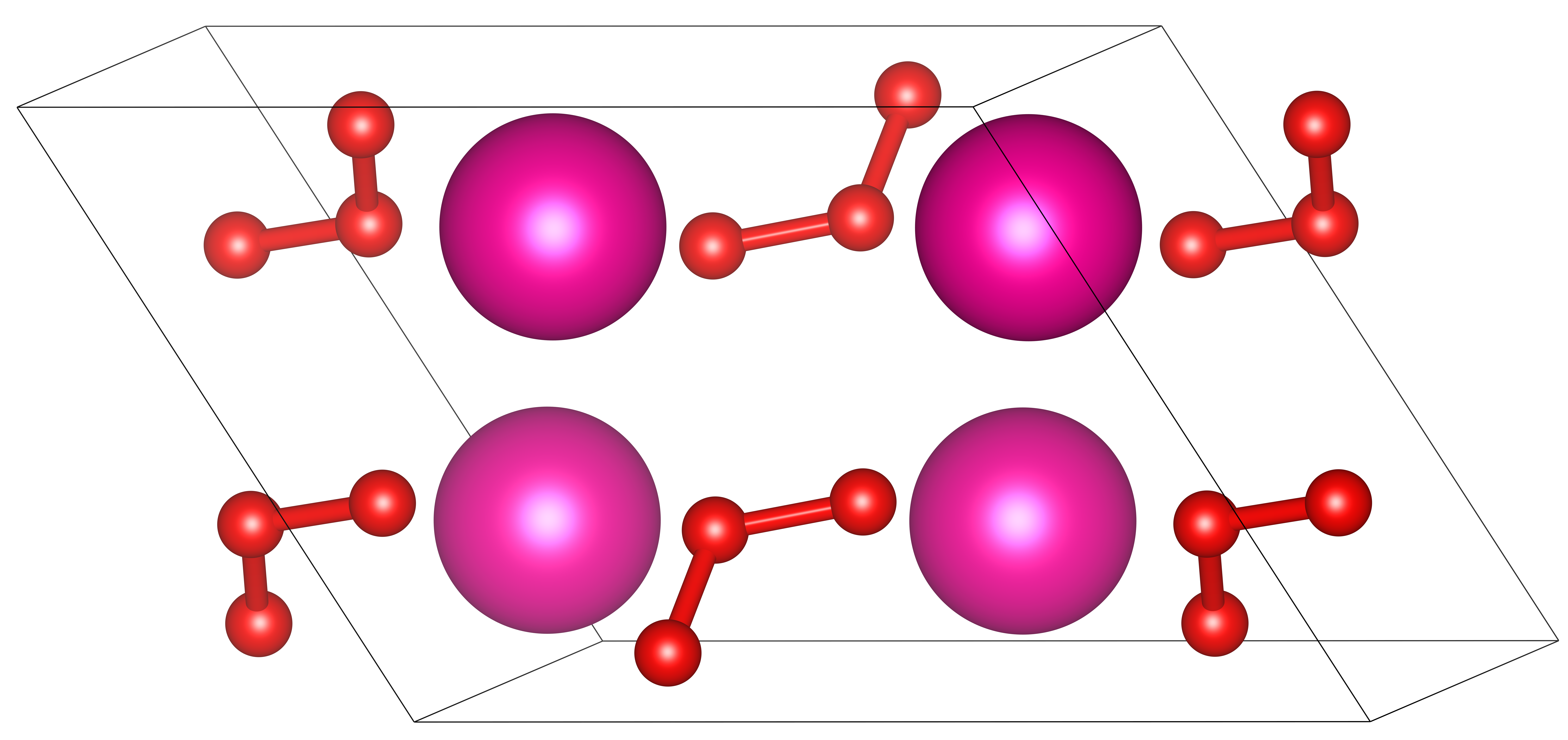

Identifiers
CAS Number	11139-50-7
3D model (JSmol)	Interactive image
- InChI: InChI=1S/Rb.HO3/c;1-3-2/h;1H/q+1;/p-1 Key: LKBBZAZOURCTNC-UHFFFAOYSA-M
- SMILES: [Rb+].[O-]O[O]

Properties
Chemical formula	RbO_{3}
Molar mass	133.465 g·mol^{−1}
Appearance	Dark red or brownish red crystals

Related compounds
Other anions	Rubidium fluoride Rubidium chloride Rubidium bromide Rubidium iodide
Other cations	Lithium ozonide Sodium ozonide Potassium ozonide Caesium ozonide Ammonium ozonide
Related rubidium oxides	Rubidium suboxide Rubidium oxide Rubidium sesquioxide Rubidium peroxide Rubidium superoxide
- Except where otherwise noted, data are given for materials in their standard state (at 25 °C [77 °F], 100 kPa). Infobox references

Rubidium ozonide is an oxygen rich compound of rubidium with the chemical formula RbO_{3}. It consists of rubidium cations Rb^{+} and ozonide anions O^{−}_{3}.

It can be created by reacting rubidium superoxide (RbO_{2}) with ozone (O_{3}) in a liquid ammonia solution.

RbO_{2} + O_{3} → RbO_{3} + O_{2}

The chemical forms in two crystal structures, the low temperature α-RbO_{3} (P2_{1}), and β-RbO_{3} (P2_{1}/c) Detailed structural analysis finds the ozonide anions are significantly off-center from the surrounding rubidium atoms.

Since ozonide anion is magnetic, electron paramagnetic resonance measurements of rubidium ozonide have determined the g-values of the ozonide anion.
