= Ammonium ozonide =

Identifiers
CAS Number	12161-20-5
3D model (JSmol)	Interactive image
- InChI: InChI=1S/H3N.HO3/c;1-3-2/h1H3;1H Key: QNCFLJHTDUIYDM-UHFFFAOYSA-N
- SMILES: [NH4+].[O-]O[O]

Properties
Chemical formula	NH_{4}O_{3}
Molar mass	66.036 g·mol^{−1}
Appearance	Deep red solid

Related compounds
Other anions	Ammonium nitrate
Other cations	Potassium ozonide; Caesium ozonide; Tetramethylammonium ozonide
- Except where otherwise noted, data are given for materials in their standard state (at 25 °C [77 °F], 100 kPa). Infobox references

Ammonium ozonide is an oxygen rich compound with the formula NH_{4}O_{3}. This salt consists of ammonium cations (NH^{+}_{4}) and ozonide anions (O^{−}_{3}). Ammonium ozonide, like alkali ozonides, is a deep red solid. Ammonium ozonide is stable at low temperatures, but it decomposes to ammonium nitrate at temperatures above −70 °C.

== Preparation and decomposition ==
Ammonium ozonide is made by bubbling gaseous ozone through liquid ammonia at −110 °C. This method suffers from a low yield.

12 NH_{3} + 11 O_{3} → 9 NH_{4}O_{3} + 3 NO_{2}

Ammonium ozonide decomposes into ammonium nitrate, oxygen gas, and water. If the above reaction is done at high temperatures, these decomposition products result immediately and no ozonide is formed.

4 NH_{4}O_{3} → 2 NH_{4}NO_{3} + O_{2} + 4 H_{2}O
