= Rubidium oxide =

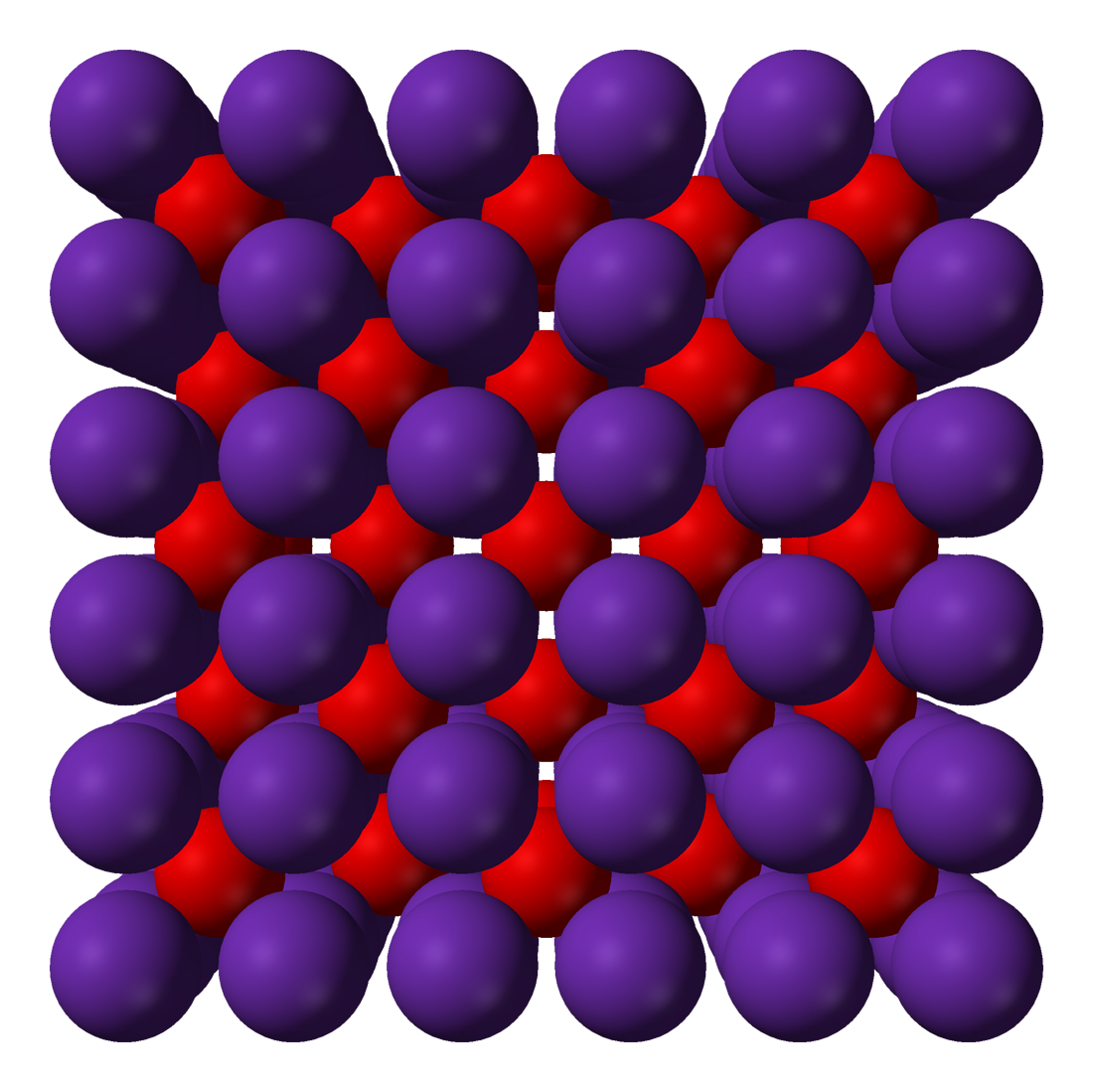

Names
- IUPAC name Rubidium oxide
- Other names Rubidium(I) oxide Dirubidium oxide

Identifiers
CAS Number	18088-11-4
3D model (JSmol)	Interactive image
ChemSpider	8329869
ECHA InfoCard	100.038.161
PubChem CID	10154361
CompTox Dashboard (EPA)	DTXSID001014305
- InChI: InChI=1S/O.2Rb/q-2;2*+1 Key: YIONJVUULJNSMK-UHFFFAOYSA-N
- SMILES: [Rb+].[O-2].[Rb+]

Properties
Chemical formula	Rb_{2}O
Molar mass	186.94 g/moL
Appearance	Yellow solid
Density	4 g/cm^{3}
Melting point	>500 °C
Solubility in water	Reacts to give RbOH
Magnetic susceptibility (χ)	+1527.0·10^{−6} cm^{3}/mol

Structure
Crystal structure	Antifluorite (cubic), cF12
Space group	Fm3̅m, No. 225
Coordination geometry	Tetrahedral (Rb^{+}); cubic (O^{2−})

Hazards
- Occupational safety and health (OHS/OSH)
Main hazards	Corrosive, reacts violently with water
NFPA 704 (fire diamond)	3 0 1 W
Flash point	Non-flammable

Related compounds
Other anions	Rubidium sulfide Rubidium selenide Rubidium telluride Rubidium polonide
Other cations	Lithium oxide Sodium oxide Potassium oxide Caesium oxide
Related rubidium oxides	Rubidium suboxide Rubidium peroxide Rubidium sesquioxide Rubidium superoxide Rubidium ozonide
Related compounds	Rubidium hydroxide
- Except where otherwise noted, data are given for materials in their standard state (at 25 °C [77 °F], 100 kPa). verify (what is ?) Infobox references

Rubidium oxide is the chemical compound with the formula Rb_{2}O. Rubidium oxide is highly reactive towards water, and therefore it would not be expected to occur naturally. The rubidium content in minerals is often calculated and quoted in terms of Rb_{2}O. In reality, the rubidium is typically present as a component of (actually, an impurity in) silicate or aluminosilicate. A major source of rubidium is lepidolite, KLi_{2}Al(Al,Si)_{3}O_{10}(F,OH)_{2}, wherein Rb sometimes replaces K.

Rb_{2}O is a yellow colored solid. The related species Na_{2}O, K_{2}O, and Cs_{2}O are colorless, pale-yellow, and orange, respectively.

The alkali metal oxides M_{2}O (M = Li, Na, K, Rb) crystallise in the antifluorite structure. In the antifluorite motif, the positions of the anions and cations are reversed relative to their positions in CaF_{2}, with rubidium ions 4-coordinate (tetrahedral) and oxide ions 8-coordinate (cubic).

== Properties ==
Like other alkali metal oxides, Rb_{2}O is a strong base. Thus, Rb_{2}O reacts exothermically with water to form rubidium hydroxide.

Rb_{2}O + H_{2}O → 2 RbOH

So reactive is Rb_{2}O toward water that it is considered hygroscopic. Upon heating, Rb_{2}O reacts with hydrogen to rubidium hydroxide and rubidium hydride:

Rb_{2}O + H_{2} → RbOH + RbH

== Synthesis ==
For laboratory use, RbOH, which is available commercially, is used in place of the oxide. The hydroxide is less reactive than the oxide.

As is the case for potassium oxide, Rb_{2}O can be prepared by thermal reaction of the metal with a deficiency of oxygen:

4 Rb + O_{2} → 2 Rb_{2}O

The Rb reaction with O_{2} is relatively colorful as it proceeds via bronze-colored Rb_{6}O and copper-colored Rb_{9}O_{2}. The suboxides of rubidium that have been characterized by X-ray crystallography include Rb_{9}O_{2} and Rb_{6}O, as well as the mixed Cs-Rb suboxides Cs_{11}O_{3}Rb_{n} (n = 1, 2, 3).

The product of oxygenation with excess oxygen is principally RbO_{2}, rubidium superoxide:

Rb + O_{2} → RbO_{2}

This superoxide can then be reduced to Rb_{2}O using excess rubidium meta.

Alternatively rubidium metal reacts with mercuric oxide:

2 Rb + HgO → Rb_{2}O + Hg

Typical for alkali metal hydroxides, RbOH cannot be dehydrated to the oxide.
