= Sodium ozonide =

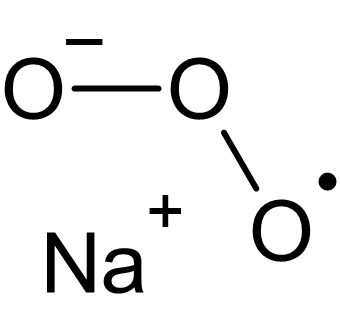

Names
- IUPAC name Sodium ozonide

Identifiers
3D model (JSmol)	Interactive image
- InChI: InChI=1S/Na.HO3/c;1-3-2/h;1H/q+1;/p-1 Key: ZWXLQJCNVRJOAA-UHFFFAOYSA-M
- SMILES: [Na+].[O-]O[O]

Properties
Chemical formula	NaO_{3}
Appearance	Intensely red crystalline solid

Structure
Crystal structure	Sodium nitrite structure (orthorhombic)
Space group	Im2m (No. 44)
Lattice constant	a = 3.5070 Å, b = 5.7703 Å, c = 5.2701 Å
Lattice volume (V)	106.777 Å^{3}
Formula units (Z)	2

Related compounds
Other anions	Sodium fluoride Sodium chloride Sodium bromide Sodium iodide
Other cations	Lithium ozonide Potassium ozonide Rubidium ozonide Caesium ozonide
Related sodium oxides	Sodium oxide Sodium peroxide Sodium superoxide
- Except where otherwise noted, data are given for materials in their standard state (at 25 °C [77 °F], 100 kPa). Infobox references

Sodium ozonide (NaO_{3}) is an oxygen-rich compound of sodium. As an ozonide, it contains the ozonide anion (O^{−}_{3}).

Some experiments report creating sodium ozonide by applying ozone to sodium hydroxide, but the substance was not pure, and the claimed stability at room temperature was contradicted by other reports. This is in contrast to potassium ozonide, rubidium ozonide, and caesium ozonide, which can be synthesized applying ozone directly to the metal. Instead, it is made in ammonia solution using ion exchange and cryptands.

The compound is unstable at room temperature and decomposes at −10 °C to sodium superoxide and oxygen.

2 NaO_{3} → 2 NaO_{2} + O_{2}

However, the compound can be stored for months at −18 °C.
