= Sodium oxide =

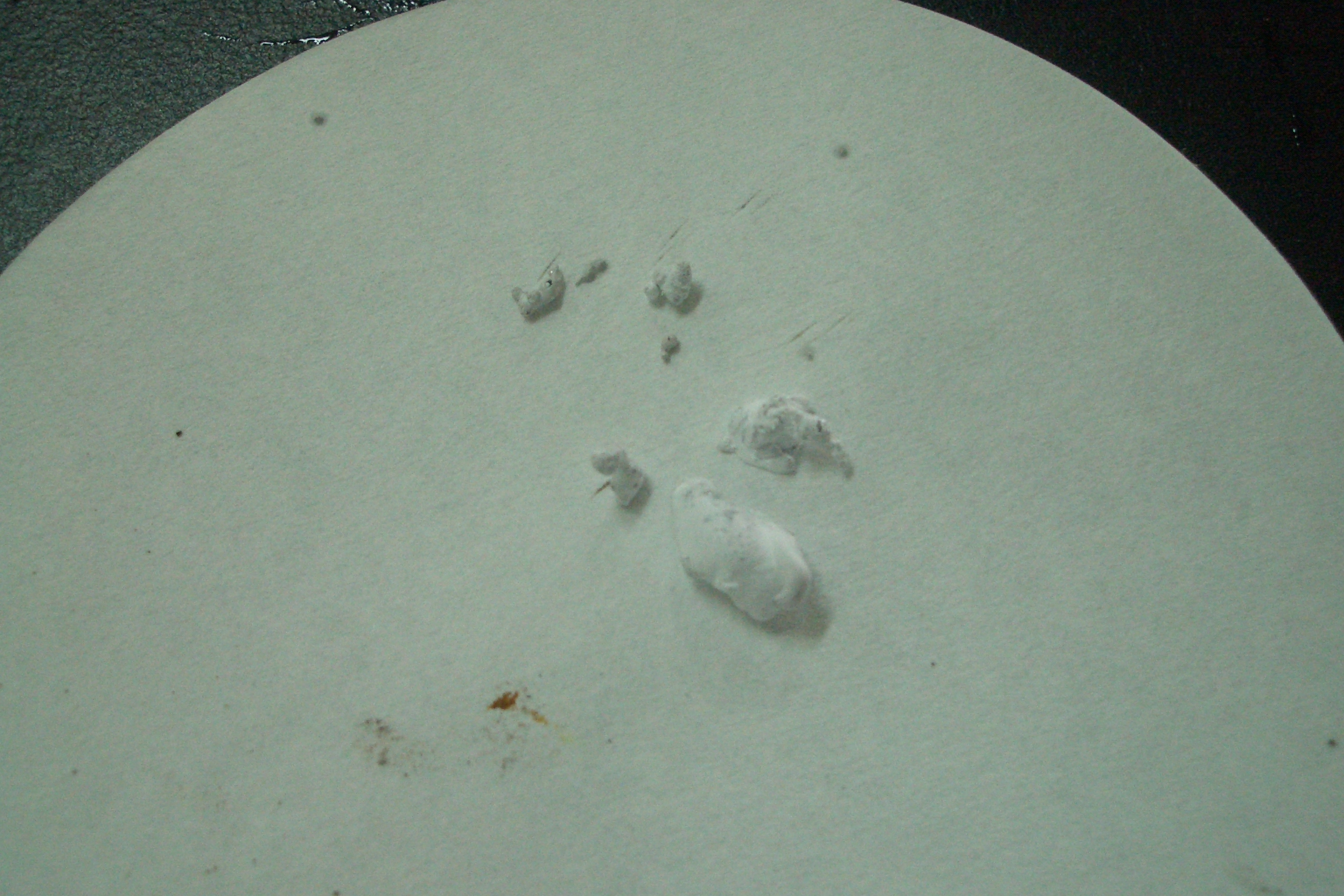

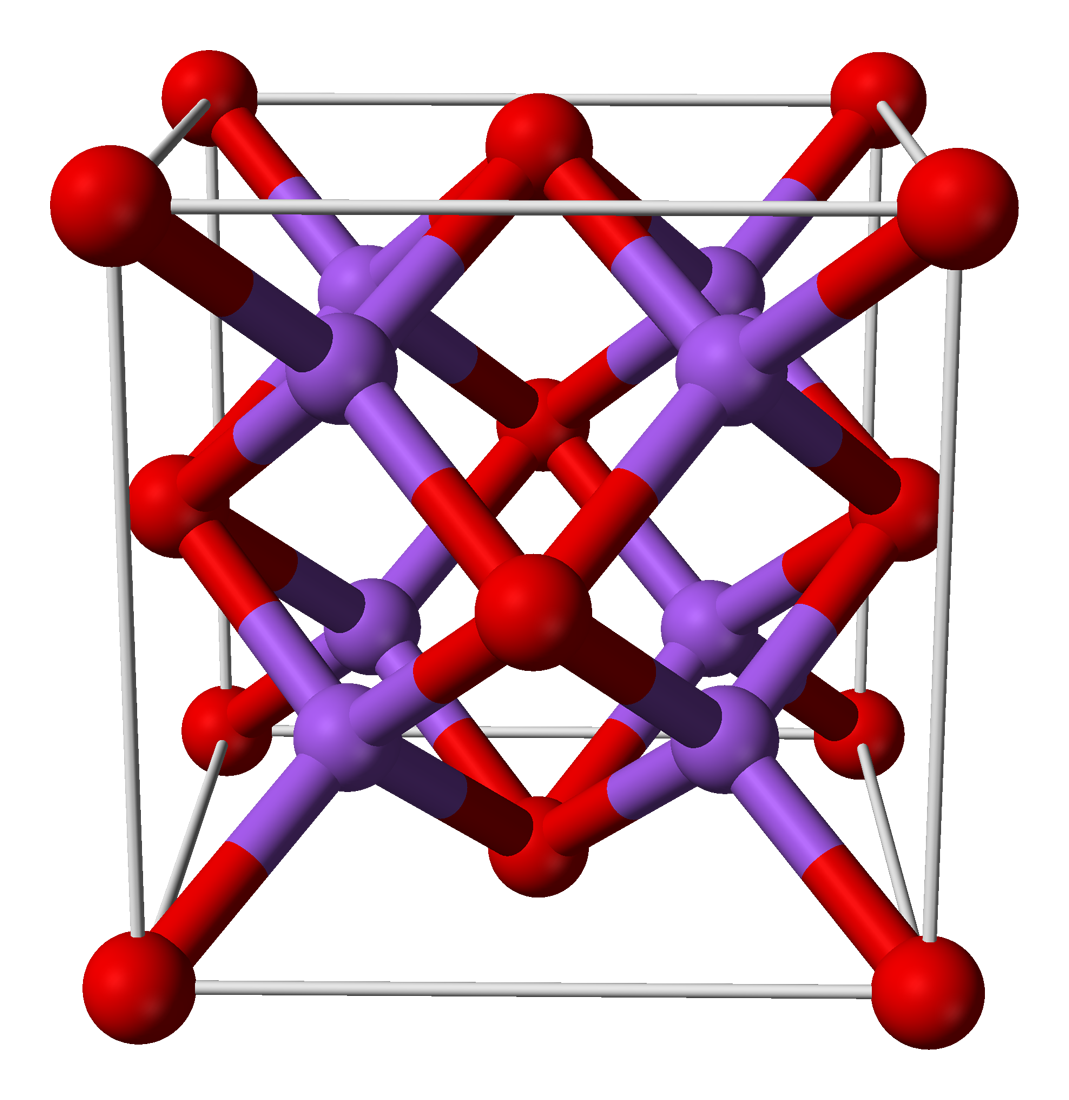
Sodium oxide
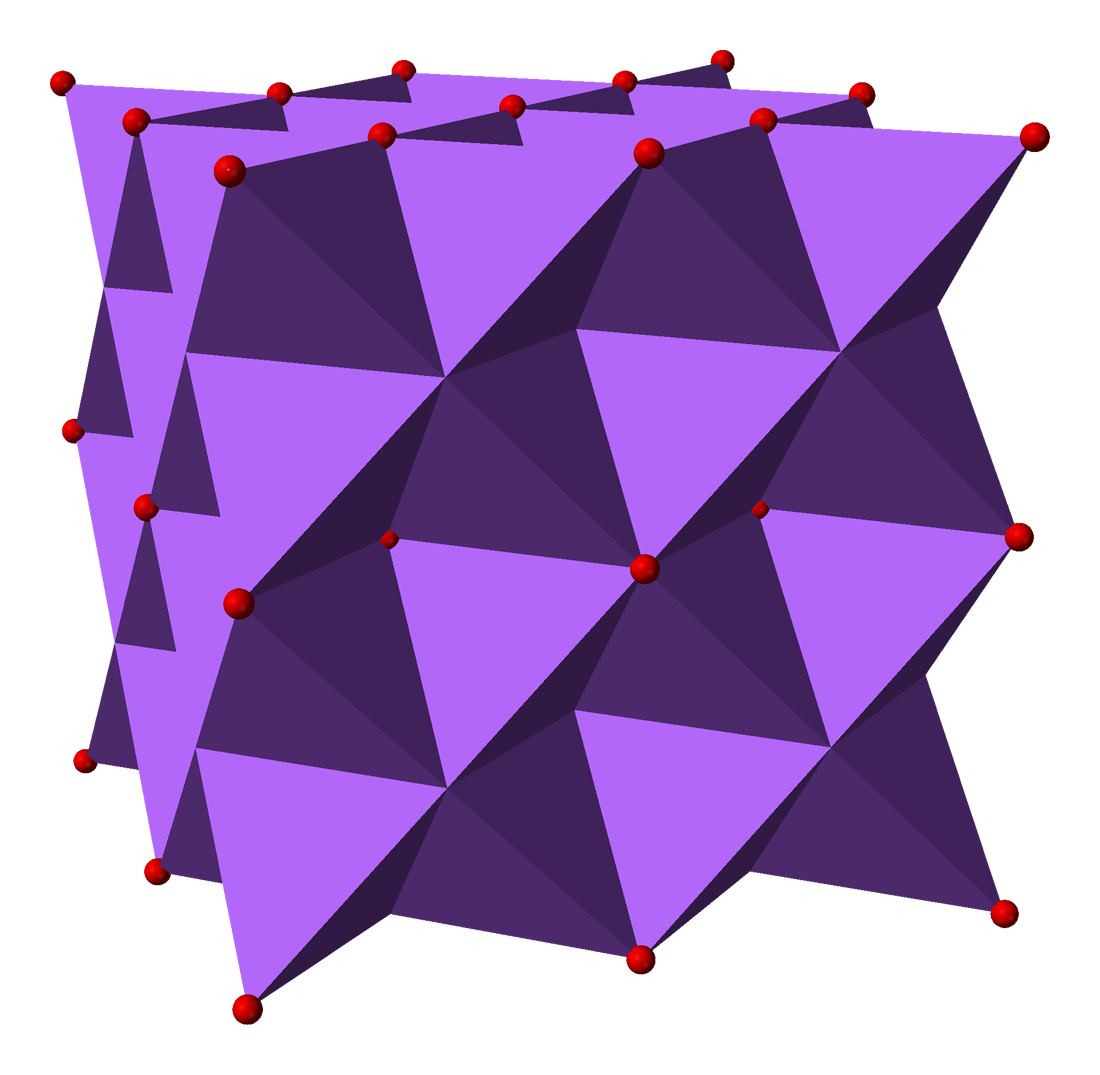
Sodium oxide

Names
- IUPAC name Sodium oxide
- Other names: Disodium oxide; Natrium oxide (historic); Soda; Sodium oxidosodium

Identifiers
CAS Number	1313-59-3
3D model (JSmol)	Interactive image
ChemSpider	66599
ECHA InfoCard	100.013.827
EC Number	215-208-9
PubChem CID	73971
UNII	3075U8R23D
UN number	1825
CompTox Dashboard (EPA)	DTXSID0049781
- InChI: InChI=1S/2Na.O/q2*+1;-2
- SMILES: [O-2].[Na+].[Na+]

Properties
Chemical formula	Na_{2}O
Molar mass	61.979 g·mol^{−1}
Appearance	white solid
Density	2.49 g/cm^{3}
Melting point	1,132 °C (2,070 °F; 1,405 K)
Boiling point	1,950 °C (3,540 °F; 2,220 K) sublimates
Sublimation conditions	sublimates at 1275 °C
Solubility in water	Reacts to form NaOH
Solubility	Reacts with ethanol
Magnetic susceptibility (χ)	−19.8·10^{−6} cm^{3}/mol

Structure
Crystal structure	Antifluorite (face centered cubic), cF12
Space group	Fm3̅m, No. 225
Coordination geometry	Tetrahedral (Na^{+}); cubic (O^{2−})

Thermochemistry
Heat capacity (C)	72.95 J/(mol·K)
Std molar entropy (S^{⦵}_{298})	73 J/(mol·K)
Std enthalpy of formation (Δ_{f}H^{⦵}_{298})	−416 kJ/mol
Gibbs free energy (Δ_{f}G^{⦵})	−377.1 kJ/mol

Hazards
- Occupational safety and health (OHS/OSH)
Main hazards	corrosive, reacts violently with water
- GHS labelling
Pictograms	(GHS05: Corrosive)
Hazard statements	H314
Precautionary statements	P260, P264, P280, P301+P330+P331, P303+P361+P353, P304+P340, P305+P351+P338, P310, P321, P363, P405, P501
NFPA 704 (fire diamond)	3 0 1 W
Flash point	nonflammable
Safety data sheet (SDS)	ICSC 1653

Related compounds
Other anions	Sodium sulfide; Sodium selenide; Sodium telluride; Sodium polonide
Other cations	Lithium oxide; Potassium oxide; Rubidium oxide; Caesium oxide
Related sodium oxides	Sodium peroxide; Sodium superoxide; Sodium ozonide
Related compounds	Sodium hydroxide
- Except where otherwise noted, data are given for materials in their standard state (at 25 °C [77 °F], 100 kPa). verify (what is ?) Infobox references

Sodium oxide is a chemical compound with the formula Na_{2}O. It is used in ceramics and glasses. It is a white solid. However, the compound itself is rarely encountered and instead, the name "sodium oxide" is used to describe components of various materials such as glasses and fertilizers which contain oxides that include sodium and other elements.

== Structure ==
The structure of sodium oxide has been determined by X-ray crystallography. Most alkali metal oxides M_{2}O (M = Li, Na, K, Rb) crystallise in the antifluorite structure. In this motif the positions of the anions and cations are reversed relative to their positions in CaF_{2}, with sodium ions tetrahedrally coordinated to 4 oxide ions and oxide cubically coordinated to 8 sodium ions.

== Preparation ==
Sodium oxide is produced by the reaction of sodium with sodium hydroxide, sodium peroxide, or sodium nitrite:

2 NaOH + 2 Na → 2 Na_{2}O + H_{2}

To the extent that NaOH is contaminated with water, correspondingly greater amounts of sodium are employed. Excess sodium is distilled from the crude product.

A second method involves heating a mixture of sodium azide and sodium nitrate:

5 NaN_{3} + NaNO_{3} → 3 Na_{2}O + 8 N_{2}

Burning sodium in air produces a mixture of Na_{2}O and sodium peroxide (Na_{2}O_{2}):

4 Na + O_{2} → 2Na_{2}O
and
2 Na + O_{2} → Na_{2}O_{2}

A third, much less common, method involves a single displacement reaction when heating sodium metal with iron(III) oxide (rust):

6 Na + Fe_{2}O_{3} → 3 Na_{2}O + 2 Fe

the reaction is done in an inert atmosphere to avoid the reaction of sodium with the air instead.

== Applications ==
=== Glassmaking ===
Glasses are often described in terms of their sodium oxide content although they do not really contain Na_{2}O. Furthermore, such glasses are not made from sodium oxide, but the equivalent of Na_{2}O is added in the form of "soda" (sodium carbonate), which loses carbon dioxide at high temperatures:

Na_{2}CO_{3} → Na_{2}O + CO_{2}
Na_{2}O + SiO_{2} → Na_{2}SiO_{3}
Na_{2}CO_{3} + SiO_{2} → Na_{2}SiO_{3} + CO_{2}

A typical manufactured glass contains around 15% sodium oxide, 70% silica (silicon dioxide), and 9% lime (calcium oxide). The sodium carbonate "soda" serves as a flux to lower the temperature at which the silica mixture melts. Such soda-lime glass has a much lower melting temperature than pure silica and has slightly higher elasticity. These changes arise because the Na_{2}[SiO_{2}]_{x}[SiO_{3}]-based material is somewhat more flexible.

== Reactions ==
Sodium oxide reacts readily and irreversibly with water to give sodium hydroxide:

Na_{2}O + H_{2}O → 2 NaOH

Because of this reaction, sodium oxide is sometimes referred to as the base anhydride of sodium hydroxide (more archaically, "anhydride of caustic soda").
