= Caesium oxide =

Caesium oxide (IUPAC name), or cesium oxide, describes inorganic compounds composed of caesium and oxygen. Several binary (containing only Cs and O) oxides of caesium are known.

Caesium oxide may refer to:

- Caesium suboxides (Cs_{7}O, Cs_{4}O, and Cs_{11}O_{3})
- Caesium monoxide (Cs_{2}O, the most common oxide)
- Caesium peroxide (Cs_{2}O_{2})
- Caesium sesquioxide (Cs_{2}O_{3})
- Caesium superoxide (CsO_{2})
- Caesium ozonide (CsO_{3})
