= Sodium peroxide =

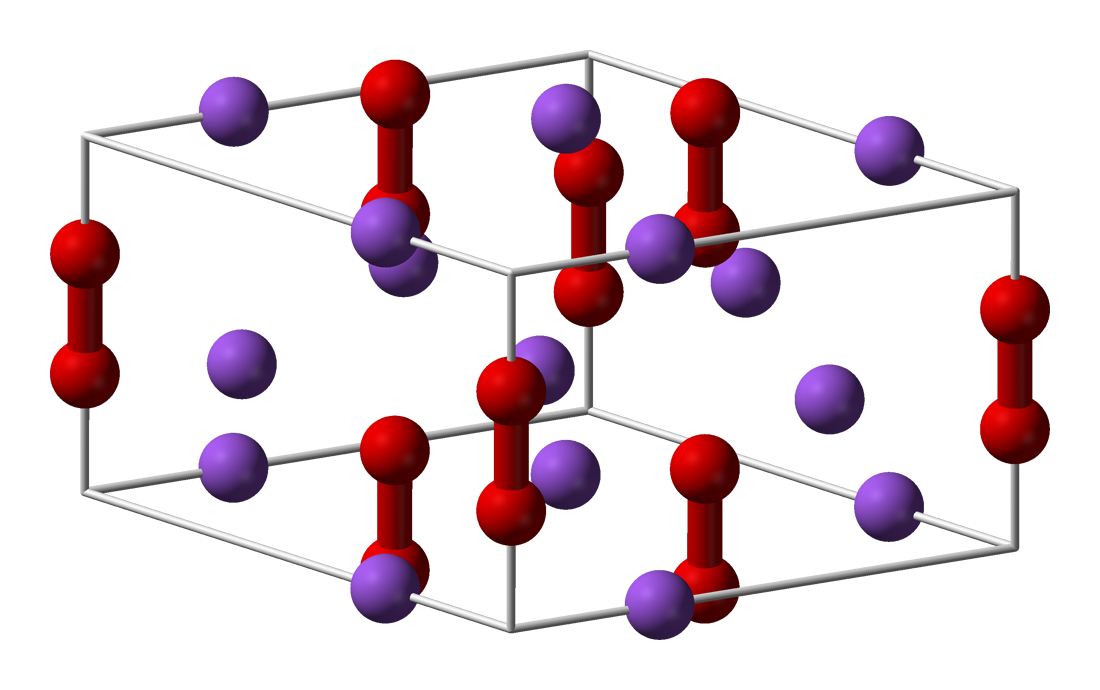
- Sodium peroxide

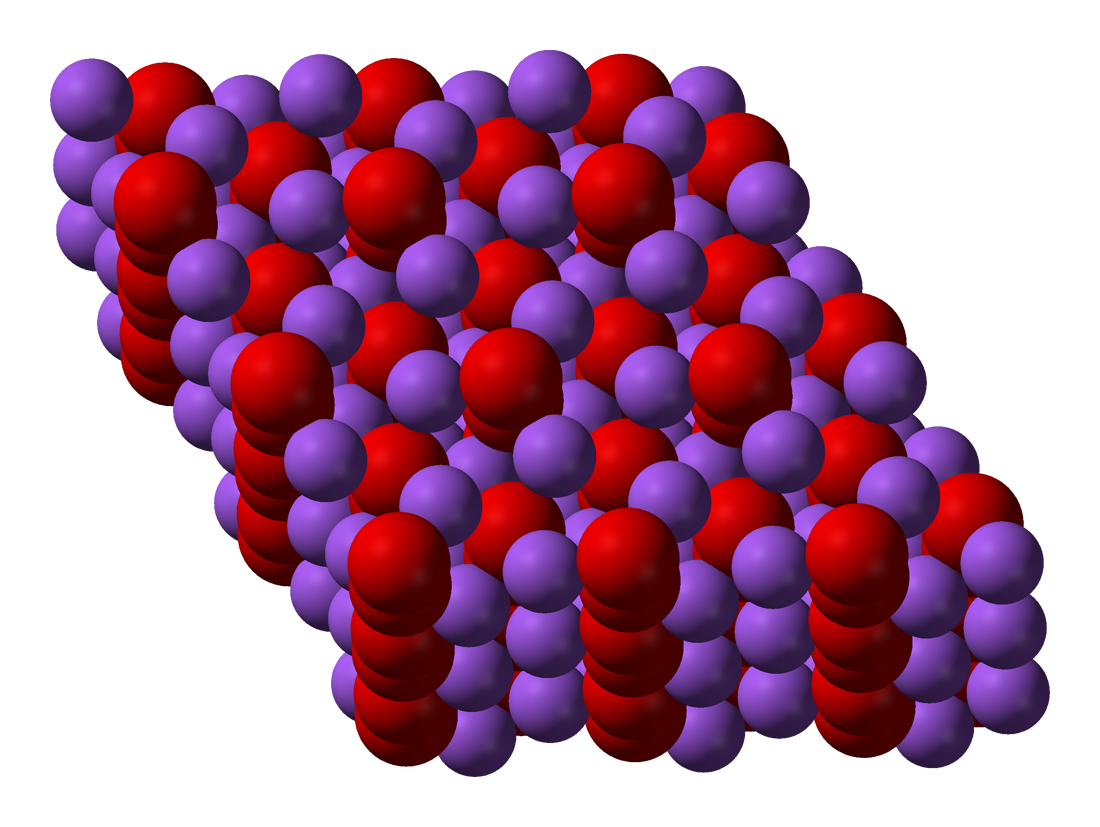

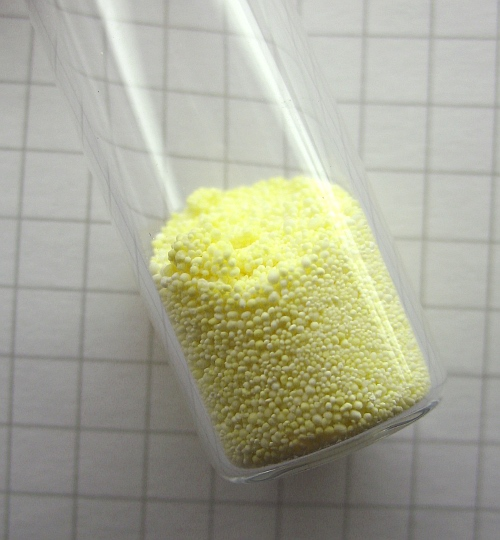

Names
- IUPAC name Sodium peroxide
- Other names Flocool; Solozone; Disodium peroxide

Identifiers
CAS Number	1313-60-6
3D model (JSmol)	Interactive image
ChemSpider	14119
ECHA InfoCard	100.013.828
EC Number	215-209-4
PubChem CID	14803
RTECS number	WD3450000
UNII	3GSN3JCJ5K
UN number	1504
CompTox Dashboard (EPA)	DTXSID0061660
- InChI: InChI=1S/2Na.O2/c;;1-2/q2*+1;-2 Key: PFUVRDFDKPNGAV-UHFFFAOYSA-N
- SMILES: [O-][O-].[Na+].[Na+]

Properties
Chemical formula	Na_{2}O_{2}
Molar mass	77.98 g/mol
Appearance	white solid (pure) yellowish solid (commercial samples)
Density	2.805 g/cm^{3}
Melting point	460 °C (860 °F; 733 K) (decomposes)
Boiling point	657 °C (1,215 °F; 930 K) (decomposes)
Solubility in water	Reacts
Solubility	Soluble in acid Insoluble in base Reacts with ethanol
Magnetic susceptibility (χ)	−28.10·10^{−6} cm^{3}/mol

Structure
Crystal structure	hexagonal

Thermochemistry
Heat capacity (C)	89.37 J/(mol·K)
Std molar entropy (S^{⦵}_{298})	95 J/(mol·K)
Std enthalpy of formation (Δ_{f}H^{⦵}_{298})	−515 kJ·mol^{−1}
Gibbs free energy (Δ_{f}G^{⦵})	−446.9 kJ/mol

Hazards
- Occupational safety and health (OHS/OSH)
Main hazards	Caustic, reacts with water and ethanol, oxidizer
- GHS labelling
Pictograms	(GHS03: Oxidizing) (GHS05: Corrosive)
Signal word	Danger
Hazard statements	H271, H314
Precautionary statements	P210, P220, P221, P260, P264, P280, P283, P301+P330+P331, P303+P361+P353, P304+P340, P305+P351+P338, P306+P360, P310, P321, P363, P370+P378, P371+P380+P375, P405, P501
NFPA 704 (fire diamond)	3 0 2 W; OX
Flash point	Non-flammable
Safety data sheet (SDS)	External MSDS

Related compounds
Other cations	Lithium peroxide Potassium peroxide Rubidium peroxide Caesium peroxide
Related sodium oxides	Sodium oxide Sodium superoxide Sodium ozonide
Related compounds	Sodium hydroxide Hydrogen peroxide
- Except where otherwise noted, data are given for materials in their standard state (at 25 °C [77 °F], 100 kPa). verify (what is ?) Infobox references

Sodium peroxide is an inorganic compound with the formula Na_{2}O_{2}. It is the product of sodium ignited in excess oxygen. The pure substance is a white solid, but commercial and laboratory samples often appear as a yellowish solid due to sodium superoxide impurities. It is a strong base. This metal peroxide exists in several hydrates and peroxyhydrates including Na_{2}O_{2}·2H_{2}O_{2}·4H_{2}O, Na_{2}O_{2}·2H_{2}O, Na_{2}O_{2}·2H_{2}O_{2}, and Na_{2}O_{2}·8H_{2}O. The octahydrate, which is simple to prepare, is white, like the pure anhydrous material.

== Properties ==
Sodium peroxide crystallizes with hexagonal symmetry. Upon heating, the hexagonal form undergoes a transition into a phase of unknown symmetry at 512 °C. With further heating above the 657 °C boiling point, the compound decomposes to Na_{2}O, releasing O_{2}.

2 Na_{2}O_{2} → 2 Na_{2}O + O_{2}

== Preparation ==
Commercially, sodium peroxide is produced from the elements in a two-stage process. First sodium is oxidized to sodium oxide:

4Na + O_{2} → 2 Na_{2}O

Subsequently, this oxide is treated with more oxygen:

2 Na_{2}O + O_{2} → 2 Na_{2}O_{2}

This was the method by which the substance was discovered in 1810 by Joseph Louis Gay-Lussac and Louis Jacques Thénard, as well as how it was for the first time commercially made by Hamilton Castner in the 1890s.

It may also be produced by passing ozone gas over solid sodium iodide inside a platinum or palladium tube. The ozone oxidizes the sodium to form sodium peroxide. The iodine can be sublimed by mild heating. The platinum or palladium catalyzes the reaction and is not attacked by the sodium peroxide.

The octahydrate can be produced by treating sodium hydroxide with hydrogen peroxide.

== Uses ==
Sodium peroxide hydrolyzes to give sodium hydroxide and hydrogen peroxide according to the reaction

Na_{2}O_{2} + 2 H_{2}O → 2 NaOH + H_{2}O_{2}

Sodium peroxide was used to bleach wood pulp for the production of paper and textiles. Presently it is mainly used for specialized laboratory operations, e.g., the extraction of minerals from various ores. Sodium peroxide may go by the commercial names of Solozone and Flocool. In chemistry preparations, sodium peroxide is used as an oxidizing agent. It is also used as an oxygen source by reacting it with carbon dioxide to produce oxygen and sodium carbonate:

Na_{2}O_{2} + CO_{2} → Na_{2}CO_{3} + 1/2 O_{2}
Na_{2}O_{2} + H_{2}O + 2 CO_{2} → 2 NaHCO_{3} + 1/2 O_{2}

It is thus particularly useful in scuba gear, submarines, etc. Lithium peroxide and potassium superoxide have similar uses.

Sodium peroxide was once used on a large scale for the production of sodium perborate, but alternative routes to that cleaning agent have been developed.
