= Lithium superoxide =

Identifiers
CAS Number	12136-56-0
3D model (JSmol)	Interactive image
- InChI: InChI=1S/Li.O2/c;1-2/q+1;-1 Key: GMZGUKXTXROVJB-UHFFFAOYSA-N
- SMILES: [Li+].O=[O-]

Properties
Chemical formula	LiO_{2}
Molar mass	38.94 g·mol^{−1}
Density	g/cm^{3}, solid
Melting point	<25 °C (decomposes)

Related compounds
Other cations	Sodium superoxide; Potassium superoxide; Rubidium superoxide; Caesium superoxide
Related Lithium oxides	Lithium oxide; Lithium peroxide
- Except where otherwise noted, data are given for materials in their standard state (at 25 °C [77 °F], 100 kPa). verify (what is ?) Infobox references

Lithium superoxide is an unstable inorganic salt with formula LiO_{2}. A radical compound, it can be produced at low temperature in matrix isolation experiments, or in certain nonpolar, non-protic solvents. Lithium superoxide is also a transient species during the reduction of oxygen in a lithium–air galvanic cell, and serves as a main constraint on possible solvents for such a battery. For this reason, it has been investigated thoroughly using a variety of methods, both theoretical and spectroscopic.

== Structure ==
The LiO_{2} molecule is a misnomer: the bonds between lithium and oxygen are highly ionic, with almost complete electron-transfer. The force constant between the two oxygen atoms matches the constants measured for the superoxide anion (O^{−}_{2}) in other contexts. The bond length for the O-O bond was determined to be 1.34 Å. Using a simple crystal structure optimization, the Li-O bond was calculated to be approximately 2.10 Å.

There have been quite a few studies regarding the clusters formed by LiO_{2} molecules. The most common dimer has been found to be the cage isomer. Second to it is the singlet bypyramidal structure. Studies have also been done on the chair complex and the planar ring, but these two are less favorable, though not necessarily impossible.

== Production and reactions ==
Lithium superoxide is extremely reactive because of the odd number of electrons present in the π* molecular orbital of the superoxide anion. Matrix isolation techniques can produce pure samples of the compound, but they are only stable at 15-40 K.

At higher (but still cryogenic) temperatures, lithium superoxide can be produced by ozonating lithium peroxide (Li_{2}O_{2}) in freon 12:

Li_{2}O_{2}(f_{12}) + 2 O_{3}(g) → 2 LiO_{2}(f_{12}) + 2 O_{2}(g)

The resulting product is only stable up to −35 °C.

Alternatively, lithium electride dissolved in anhydrous ammonia will reduce oxygen gas to yield the same product:

[Li^{+}][e^{−}](am) + O_{2}(g) → [Li^{+}][O^{−}_{2}](am)

Lithium superoxide is, however, only metastable in ammonia, gradually oxidizing the solvent to water and nitrogen gas:

2 O^{−}_{2} + 2 NH_{3} → N_{2} + 2 H_{2}O + 2 OH^{−}

Unlike other known decompositions of LiO_{2}, this reaction bypasses lithium peroxide.

== Occurrence ==
Like other superoxides, lithium superoxide is the product of a one-electron reduction of an oxygen molecule. It thus appears whenever oxygen is mixed with single-electron redox catalysts, such as p-benzoquinone.

=== In batteries ===
Lithium superoxide also appears at the cathode of a lithium-air galvanic cell during discharge, as in the following reaction:

Li^{+} + e^{−} + O_{2} → LiO_{2}

This product typically then reacts and proceed to form lithium peroxide, Li_{2}O_{2}

2 LiO_{2} → Li_{2}O_{2} + O_{2}

The mechanism for this last reaction has not been confirmed and developing a complete theory of the oxygen reduction process remains a theoretical challenge as of 2022. Indeed, recent work suggests that LiO_{2} can be stabilized via a suitable cathode made of graphene with iridium nanoparticles.

A significant challenge when investigating these batteries is finding an ideal solvent in which to perform these reactions; current candidates are ether- and amide-based, but these compounds readily react with the superoxide and decompose. Nevertheless, lithium-air cells remain the focus of intense research, because of their large energy density—comparable to the internal combustion engine.

=== In the atmosphere ===
Lithium superoxide can also form for extended periods of time in low-density, high-energy environments, such as the upper atmosphere. The mesosphere contains a persistent layer of alkali metal cations ablated from meteors. For sodium and potassium, many of the ions bond to form particles of the corresponding superoxide. It is currently unclear whether lithium should react analogously.

== See also ==
- Lithium oxide
- Lithium peroxide
