= Ozonide =

Polyatomic ion (O3, charge –1), or cyclic compounds made from ozone and alkenes

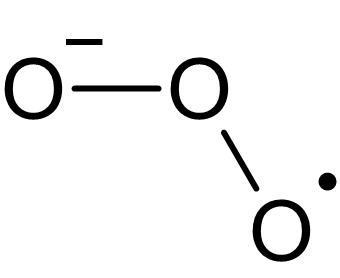

Names
- IUPAC name Trioxidan-1-id-3-yl

Identifiers
| CAS Number | 12596-80-4 |
| 3D model (JSmol) | Interactive image |
| ChEBI | CHEBI:29382 |
| ChemSpider | 10140300 |
| Gmelin Reference | 25183 |
| PubChem CID | 11966307 |
| CompTox Dashboard (EPA) | DTXSID40155003 |
- InChI: InChI=1S/HO3/c1-3-2/h1H/p-1 Key: WURFKUQACINBSI-UHFFFAOYSA-M; InChI=1/HO3/c1-3-2/h1H/p-1 Key: WURFKUQACINBSI-REWHXWOFAH
- SMILES: [O-]O[O]; [O-][O+][O-]

Properties
| Chemical formula | O^{−}_{3} |
| Molar mass | 47.997 g·mol^{−1} |
| Conjugate acid | Hydrogen ozonide |
- Except where otherwise noted, data are given for materials in their standard state (at 25 °C [77 °F], 100 kPa). Infobox references

Ozonide is the polyatomic anion with the formula O^{−}_{3}. Cyclic organic compounds formed by the addition of ozone (O_{3}) to an alkene are also called ozonides.

== Ionic ozonides ==
Inorganic ozonides are dark red salts. The anion has the bent shape of the ozone molecule.

Inorganic ozonides are formed by burning potassium, rubidium, or caesium in ozone, or by treating the alkali metal hydroxide with ozone; this yields potassium ozonide, rubidium ozonide, and caesium ozonide respectively. They are very sensitive explosives that have to be handled at low temperatures in an inert gas atmosphere. Lithium and sodium ozonide are extremely labile and must be prepared by low-temperature ion exchange starting from CsO_{3}. Sodium ozonide, NaO_{3}, which is prone to decomposition into NaOH and NaO_{2}, was previously thought to be impossible to obtain in pure form. However, with the help of cryptands and methylamine, pure sodium ozonide may be obtained as red crystals isostructural to NaNO_{2}.

Tetramethylammonium ozonide, which can be made by a metathesis reaction with caesium ozonide in liquid ammonia, is stable up to 348 K (75 °C):

CsO_{3} + [(CH_{3})_{4}N]^{+}[O_{2}]^{−} → CsO_{2} + [(CH_{3})_{4}N]^{+}[O_{3}]^{−}

Alkaline earth metal ozonide compounds have also become known. For instance, magnesium ozonide complexes have been isolated in a low-temperature argon matrix.

== Covalent singly bonded structures ==
Phosphite ozonides, (RO)_{3}PO_{3}, are used in the production of singlet oxygen. They are made by ozonizing a phosphite ester in dichloromethane at low temperatures, and decompose to yield singlet oxygen and a phosphate ester:

(RO)_{3}P + O_{3} → (RO)_{3}PO_{3}
(RO)_{3}PO_{3} → (RO)_{3}PO + ^{1}O_{2}

== See also ==
- Ozone cracking
- Superoxide, O^{−}_{2}
- Oxide, O^{2−}
- Dioxygenyl, O^{+}_{2}
