= Potassium peroxide =

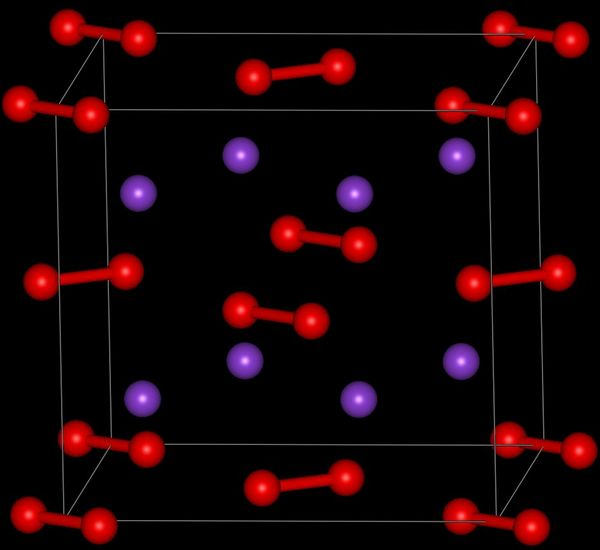

Names
- IUPAC name Potassium peroxide

Identifiers
CAS Number	17014-71-0
3D model (JSmol)	Interactive image
ChemSpider	26237
ECHA InfoCard	100.037.339
EC Number	241-089-8
PubChem CID	28202
UNII	ZHB4ZOE9PU
CompTox Dashboard (EPA)	DTXSID2066143
- InChI: InChI=1S/2K.O2/c;;1-2/q2*+1;-2 Key: XXQBEVHPUKOQEO-UHFFFAOYSA-N; InChI=1/2K.O2/c;;1-2/q2*+1;-2 Key: XXQBEVHPUKOQEO-UHFFFAOYAV
- SMILES: [O-][O-].[K+].[K+]

Properties
Chemical formula	K_{2}O_{2}
Molar mass	110.196 g/mol
Appearance	yellow amorphous solid
Melting point	490 °C (914 °F; 763 K)
Solubility in water	reacts with water

Structure
Crystal structure	Orthorhombic
Space group	Cmca, oS16

Thermochemistry
Std molar entropy (S^{⦵}_{298})	113 J·mol^{−1}·K^{−1}
Std enthalpy of formation (Δ_{f}H^{⦵}_{298})	−496 kJ·mol^{−1}

Hazards
- GHS labelling
Pictograms	(GHS03: Oxidizing) (GHS07: Exclamation mark)
Signal word	Danger
Hazard statements	H272, H315, H319
Precautionary statements	P210, P220, P221, P264, P280, P302+P352, P305+P351+P338, P321, P332+P313, P337+P313, P362, P370+P378, P501
NFPA 704 (fire diamond)	3 0 2 W; OX

Related compounds
Other anions	Potassium chloride
Other cations	Lithium peroxide Sodium peroxide Rubidium peroxide Caesium peroxide
Related potassium oxides	Potassium oxide Potassium superoxide Potassium ozonide
- Except where otherwise noted, data are given for materials in their standard state (at 25 °C [77 °F], 100 kPa). verify (what is ?) Infobox references

Potassium peroxide is an inorganic compound with the molecular formula K_{2}O_{2}. It is formed as potassium reacts with oxygen in the air, along with potassium oxide (K_{2}O) and potassium superoxide (KO_{2}).

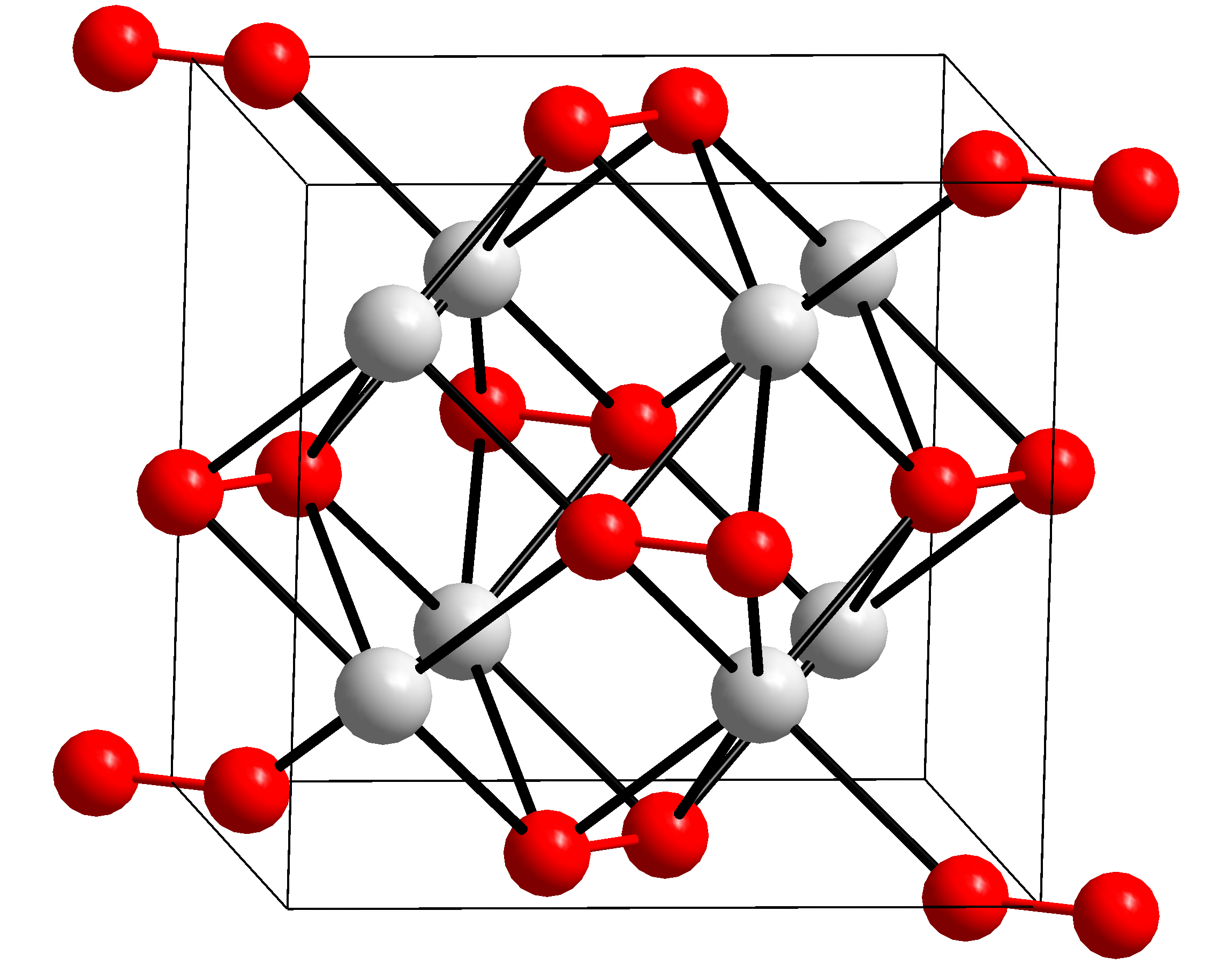
Crystal structure

Potassium peroxide reacts with water to form potassium hydroxide and oxygen:

2 K_{2}O_{2} + 2 H_{2}O → 4 KOH + O_{2} ↑

== Properties ==
Potassium peroxide is a highly reactive, oxidizing white to yellowish solid which, while not flammable itself, reacts violently with flammable materials. It decomposes violently on contact with water.

The standard enthalpy of formation of potassium peroxide is ΔH^{⦵}_{f} = −496 kJ/mol.

== Usage ==
Potassium peroxide is used as an oxidizing agent and bleach (due to the peroxide), and to purify air.
