= Rubidium superoxide =

Names
- Other names Rubidium hyperoxide, rubidio superoxide

Identifiers
CAS Number	12137-25-6
3D model (JSmol)	Interactive image
CompTox Dashboard (EPA)	DTXSID201315494
- InChI: InChI=1S/O2.Rb/c1-2;/q-1;+1 Key: AFEOXRVICKHWAE-UHFFFAOYSA-N
- SMILES: O=[O-].[Rb+]

Properties
Chemical formula	RbO_{2}
Molar mass	117.466 g·mol^{−1}
Appearance	Bright yellow

Structure
Crystal structure	Distorted CaC_{2} structure

Related compounds
Other cations	Lithium superoxide; Sodium superoxide; Potassium superoxide; Caesium superoxide
Related rubidium oxides	Rubidium suboxide; Rubidium oxide; Rubidium sesquioxide; Rubidium peroxide; Rubidium ozonide
- Except where otherwise noted, data are given for materials in their standard state (at 25 °C [77 °F], 100 kPa). Infobox references

Rubidium superoxide, rubidio superoxide or rubidium hyperoxide is a chemical compound with the chemical formula RbO_{2}. Rubidium forms superoxide under certain conditions like direct contact with oxygen. In terms of oxidation states, the negatively charged superoxide and positively charged rubidium give it a structural formula of Rb^{+}[O_{2}]^{−}.

== Properties ==
RbO_{2} is stable in dry air, but is extremely hygroscopic. Between 280 and 360 °C, rubidium superoxide will decompose, leaving not rubidium sesquioxide (Rb_{2}O_{3}), but rather rubidium peroxide (Rb_{2}O_{2}).

2 RbO_{2}(s) → Rb_{2}O_{2}(s) + O_{2}(g)

The compound has been studied as an example of magnetism arising intrinsically from the p-shell. RbO_{2} has been predicted to be a paramagnetic Mott insulator. At low temperatures, it transitions to antiferromagnetic order, with a Neel temperature of 15 K.

== Structure ==
Roughly speaking, RbO_{2} has a crystal structure similar to tetragonal calcium carbide, but is rather distorted due to the Jahn–Teller effect, which makes the crystal structure less symmetrical.

== Preparation ==
Rubidium superoxide can be created by slowly exposing elemental rubidium to oxygen gas:

Rb(s) + O_{2}(g) → RbO_{2}(s)

Like other alkali metal hyperoxides, crystals can also be grown in liquid ammonia.

== Reactions ==
An even more oxygen rich compound, that of rubidium ozonide (RbO_{3}) can be created by reacting RbO_{2} with ozone.

== See also ==
- Rubidium sesquioxide
- Rubidium oxide
