= Potassium superoxide =

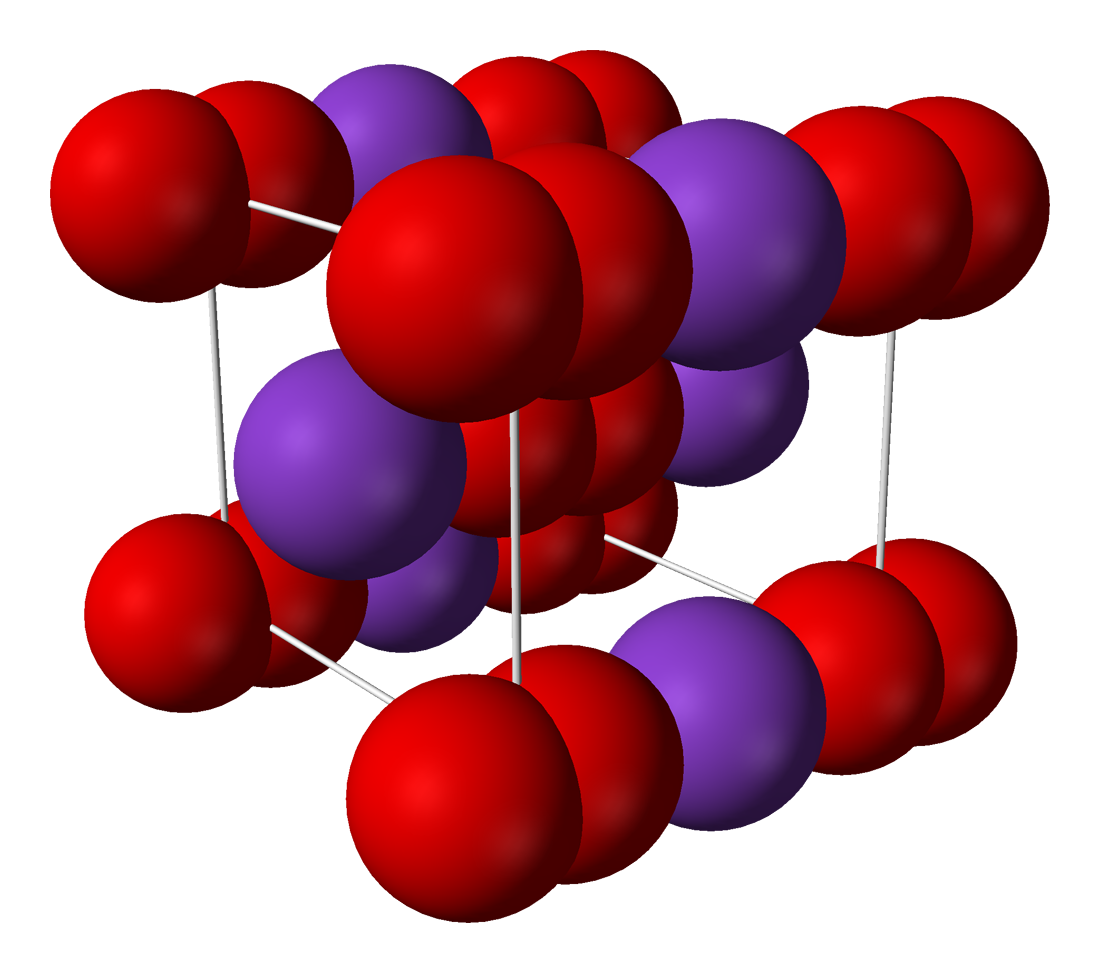
- Unit cell of potassium superoxide Potassium cations, K^{+} Superoxide anions, O^{−}_{2}

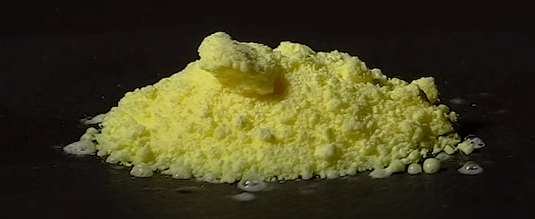

Names
- IUPAC name Potassium superoxide

Identifiers
CAS Number	12030-88-5
3D model (JSmol)	Interactive image
ChemSpider	8329498
ECHA InfoCard	100.031.574
EC Number	234-746-5
PubChem CID	61541
RTECS number	TT6053000
UNII	7YX56J6Q4W
UN number	2466
CompTox Dashboard (EPA)	DTXSID30923314
- InChI: InChI=1S/2K.O2/c;;1-2/q2*+1;-2 Key: XXQBEVHPUKOQEO-UHFFFAOYSA-N; InChI=1/2K.O2/c;;1-2/q2*+1;-2 Key: XXQBEVHPUKOQEO-UHFFFAOYAV
- SMILES: [K+].[O-]=O

Properties
Chemical formula	KO_{2}
Molar mass	71.096 g·mol^{−1}
Appearance	yellow solid
Density	2.14 g/cm^{3}, solid
Melting point	560 °C (1,040 °F; 833 K) (decomposes)
Solubility in water	Hydrolysis
Magnetic susceptibility (χ)	+3230·10^{−6} cm^{3}/mol

Structure
Crystal structure	Body-centered tetragonal

Thermochemistry
Std molar entropy (S^{⦵}_{298})	117 J/(mol·K)
Std enthalpy of formation (Δ_{f}H^{⦵}_{298})	−283 kJ/mol

Hazards
- Occupational safety and health (OHS/OSH)
Main hazards	Corrosive, oxidizer, reacts violently with water
- GHS labelling
Pictograms	(GHS03: Oxidizing) (GHS05: Corrosive)
Signal word	Danger
Hazard statements	H271, H314
Precautionary statements	P210, P220, P221, P260, P264, P280, P283, P301+P330+P331, P303+P361+P353, P304+P340, P305+P351+P338, P306+P360, P310, P321, P363, P370+P378, P371+P380+P375, P405, P501
NFPA 704 (fire diamond)	3 0 3 W; OX

Related compounds
Other cations	Lithium superoxide; Sodium superoxide; Rubidium superoxide; Caesium superoxide
Related potassium oxides	Potassium oxide; Potassium peroxide; Potassium ozonide
- Except where otherwise noted, data are given for materials in their standard state (at 25 °C [77 °F], 100 kPa). verify (what is ?) Infobox references

Potassium superoxide is an inorganic compound with the formula KO_{2}. It is a yellow paramagnetic solid that decomposes in moist air. It is a rare example of a stable salt of the superoxide anion. It is used as a CO_{2} scrubber, H_{2}O dehumidifier, and O_{2} generator in rebreathers, spacecraft, submarines, and spacesuits.

== Production and reactions ==
Potassium superoxide is produced by burning molten potassium in an atmosphere of excess oxygen.

K + O_{2} → KO_{2}

The salt consists of K^{+} and O^{−}_{2} ions, linked by ionic bonding. The O–O distance is 1.28 Å.

== Reactivity ==
Potassium superoxide is a source of superoxide, which is an oxidant and a nucleophile, depending on its reaction partner.

Upon contact with water, it undergoes disproportionation to potassium hydroxide, oxygen, and hydrogen peroxide:

4 KO_{2} + 2 H_{2}O → 4 KOH + 3 O_{2}
2 KO_{2} + 2 H_{2}O → 2 KOH + H_{2}O_{2} + O_{2}

It reacts with carbon dioxide, releasing oxygen:

4 KO_{2} + 2 CO_{2} → 2 K_{2}CO_{3} + 3 O_{2}
4 KO_{2} + 4 CO_{2} + 2 H_{2}O → 4 KHCO_{3} + 3 O_{2}

Theoretically, 1 kg of KO_{2} absorbs 0.310 kg of CO_{2} while releasing 0.338 kg of O_{2}. One mole of KO_{2} absorbs 0.5 moles of CO_{2} and releases 0.75 moles of oxygen.

As a laboratory reagent, potassium superoxide only finds niche uses. Because it reacts with water, KO_{2} is often studied in organic solvents. Since the salt is poorly soluble in nonpolar solvents, crown ethers are typically used. The tetraethylammonium salt is also known. Representative reactions of these salts involve using superoxide as a nucleophile, e.g., in converting alkyl bromides to alcohols and acyl chlorides to diacyl peroxides.

Ion exchange with tetramethylammonium hydroxide gives tetramethylammonium superoxide, a yellow solid.

== Applications ==
The Russian Space Agency has successfully used potassium superoxide in chemical oxygen generators for its spacesuits and Soyuz spacecraft. Potassium superoxide was also used in a rudimentary life support system for five mice as part of the Biological Cosmic Ray Experiment on Apollo 17.

KO_{2} has also been used in canisters for rebreathers for firefighting and mine rescue, and in cartridges for chemical oxygen generators on submarines. A flash fire caused by dropping such a cartridge into seawater contributed to the Kursk disaster. This highly exothermic reaction with water is also the reason why potassium superoxide has had only limited use in scuba rebreathers.

== Safety ==
Potassium superoxide when in contact with metallic potassium is a pressure-sensitive explosive that detonates when scratched.
