= Rubidium peroxide =

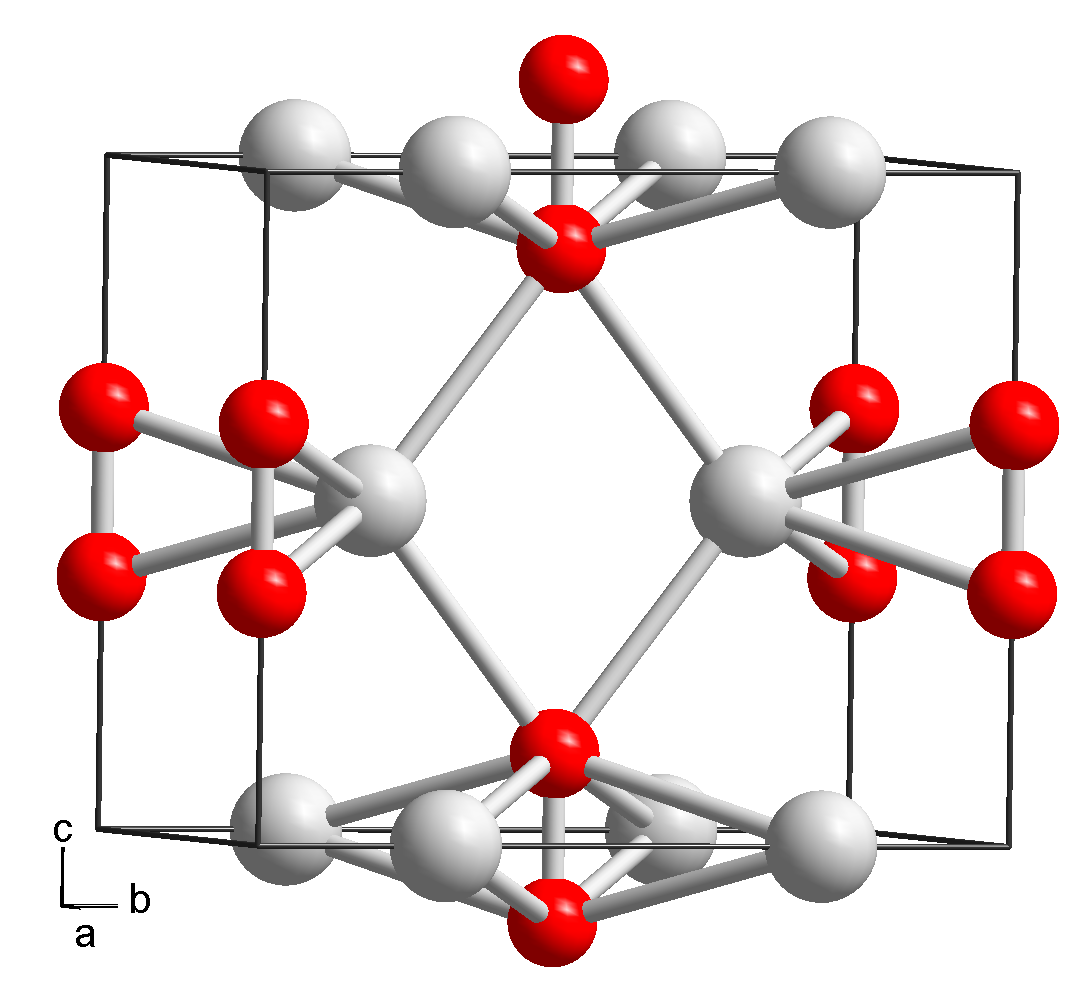

Names
- IUPAC name Rubidium peroxide

Identifiers
CAS Number	23611-30-5
3D model (JSmol)	Interactive image
ChemSpider	10737150
- InChI: InChI=1S/O2.2Rb/c1-2;;/q-2;2*+1 Key: ZMNCGAAXQANUDM-UHFFFAOYSA-N
- SMILES: [Rb+].[Rb+].[O-][O-]

Properties
Chemical formula	O_{2}Rb_{2}
Molar mass	202.934 g·mol^{−1}
Appearance	colourless solid
Density	3.80 g·cm^{−3}
Melting point	570 °C
Solubility in water	reacts

Related compounds
Other anions	Rubidium oxide Rubidium superoxide
Other cations	Lithium peroxide Sodium peroxide Potassium peroxide Caesium peroxide
- Except where otherwise noted, data are given for materials in their standard state (at 25 °C [77 °F], 100 kPa). Infobox references

Rubidium peroxide is rubidium's peroxide with the chemical formula Rb_{2}O_{2}.

== Production ==
Rubidium peroxide can be produced by rapidly oxidizing rubidium in liquid ammonia at −50°C.

$$\mathrm{2\ Rb + O_2 \ \xrightarrow{-50\;^\circ\text{C}}\ Rb_2O_2 }$$

It can also be produced by pyrolysis of rubidium superoxide in vacuum.

$$\mathrm{2\ RbO_2 \ \xrightarrow{290\;^\circ\text{C}}\ Rb_2O_2 + O_2}$$

== Properties ==
Rubidium peroxide is a colourless to light yellow solid with the orthorhombic crystal structure.
