= Caesium peroxide =

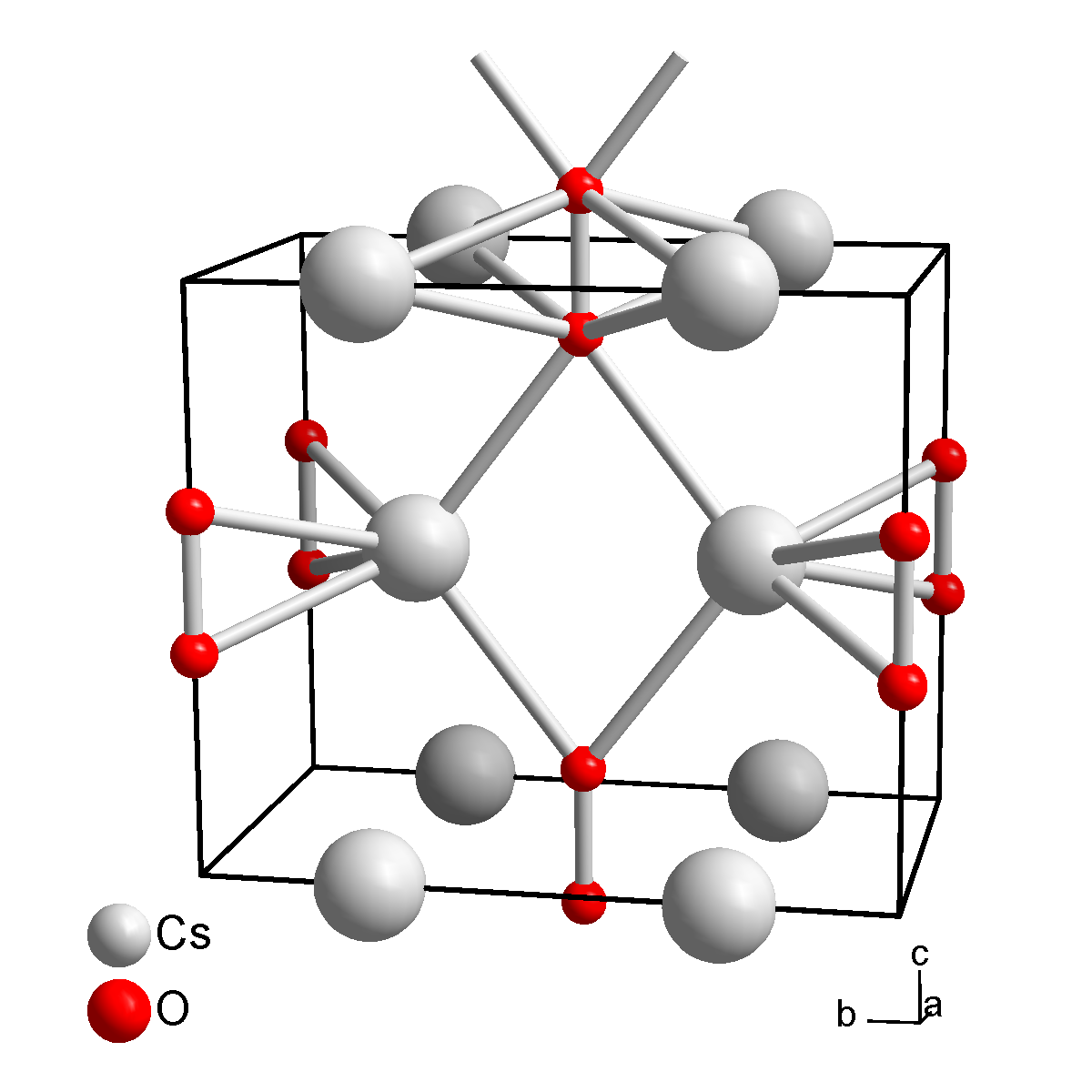

Names
- IUPAC name Caesium peroxide

Identifiers
CAS Number	12053-70-2
3D model (JSmol)	Interactive image
ChemSpider	10737153
- InChI: InChI=1S/2Cs.O2/c;;1-2/q2*+1;-2 Key: HNZHVTZRIBKSIO-UHFFFAOYSA-N
- SMILES: [Cs+].[Cs+].[O-][O-]

Properties
Chemical formula	Cs_{2}O_{2}
Molar mass	297.809 g·mol^{−1}
Appearance	Yellowish

Structure
Crystal structure	Orthorhombic

Related compounds
Other cations	Lithium peroxide; Sodium peroxide; Potassium peroxide; Rubidium peroxide
Related caesium oxides	Caesium suboxide; Caesium monoxide; Caesium sesquioxide; Caesium superoxide; Caesium ozonide
- Except where otherwise noted, data are given for materials in their standard state (at 25 °C [77 °F], 100 kPa). Infobox references

Caesium peroxide or cesium peroxide is an inorganic compound of caesium and oxygen with the chemical formula Cs_{2}O_{2}. It can be formed from caesium metal by adding a stoichiometric amount in ammonia solution, or oxidizing the solid metal directly.

2 Cs + O_{2} → Cs_{2}O_{2}

It can also be formed by the thermal decomposition of caesium superoxide:

2 CsO_{2} → Cs_{2}O_{2} + O_{2}

Upon heating until 650 °C, the compound will decompose to caesium monoxide and atomic oxygen:

Cs_{2}O_{2} → Cs_{2}O + [O]

Caesium peroxide shows a Raman vibration at 743 cm^{−1}, due to the presence of the peroxide ions. The compound is often used as a coating for photocathodes, due to its low work function.
