= Caesium superoxide =

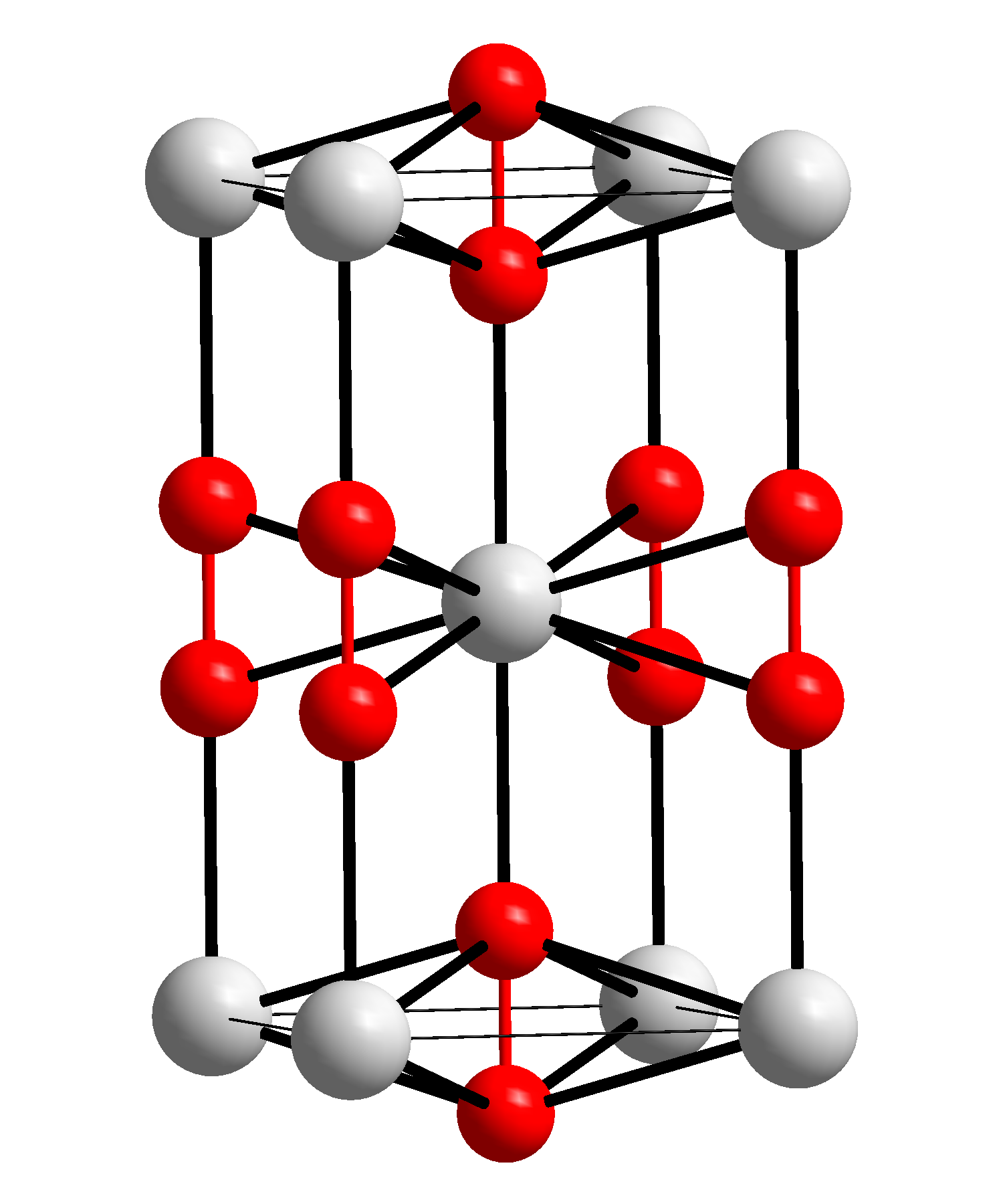
- Caesium cations, Cs^{+} Superoxide anions, O^{−}_{2}

Identifiers
| CAS Number | 12018-61-0 |
| 3D model (JSmol) | Interactive image |
- InChI: InChI=1S/Cs.HO2/c;1-2/h;1H/q+1;/p-1 Key: DZWLBLJPRRQKGB-UHFFFAOYSA-M
- SMILES: [Cs+].[O-][O]

Properties
| Chemical formula | CsO_{2} |
| Molar mass | 164.903 g·mol^{−1} |
| Appearance | Yellow to orange solid |
| Density | 3.77 g/cm^{3} |
| Melting point | 600 °C |
| Solubility in water | reacts |

Thermochemistry
| Std enthalpy of formation (Δ_{f}H^{⦵}_{298}) | −295 kJ/mol |

Related compounds
| Other anions | Caesium oxide; Caesium peroxide |
| Other cations | Lithium superoxide; Sodium superoxide; Potassium superoxide; Rubidium superoxide |
- Except where otherwise noted, data are given for materials in their standard state (at 25 °C [77 °F], 100 kPa). Infobox references

Caesium superoxide is a chemical compound with the chemical formula CsO_{2}. It consists of caesium cations Cs^{+} and superoxide anions O^{−}_{2}. It is an orange solid.

== Structure ==
Caesium superoxide's crystal structure is same as calcium carbide. It contains direct oxygen-oxygen bonding.

== Preparation ==
Burning caesium in excess oxygen will produce caesium superoxide.

Cs + O_{2} → CsO_{2}

== Reactions ==
Caesium superoxide reacts with water to form hydrogen peroxide and caesium hydroxide.

2 CsO_{2} + 2 H_{2}O → O_{2}↑ + H_{2}O_{2} + 2 CsOH

Heating to approximately 400 °C induces thermal decomposition to caesium peroxide.

It reacts with ozone to form caesium ozonide.

CsO_{2} + O_{3} → CsO_{3} + O_{2}
