= Sodium superoxide =

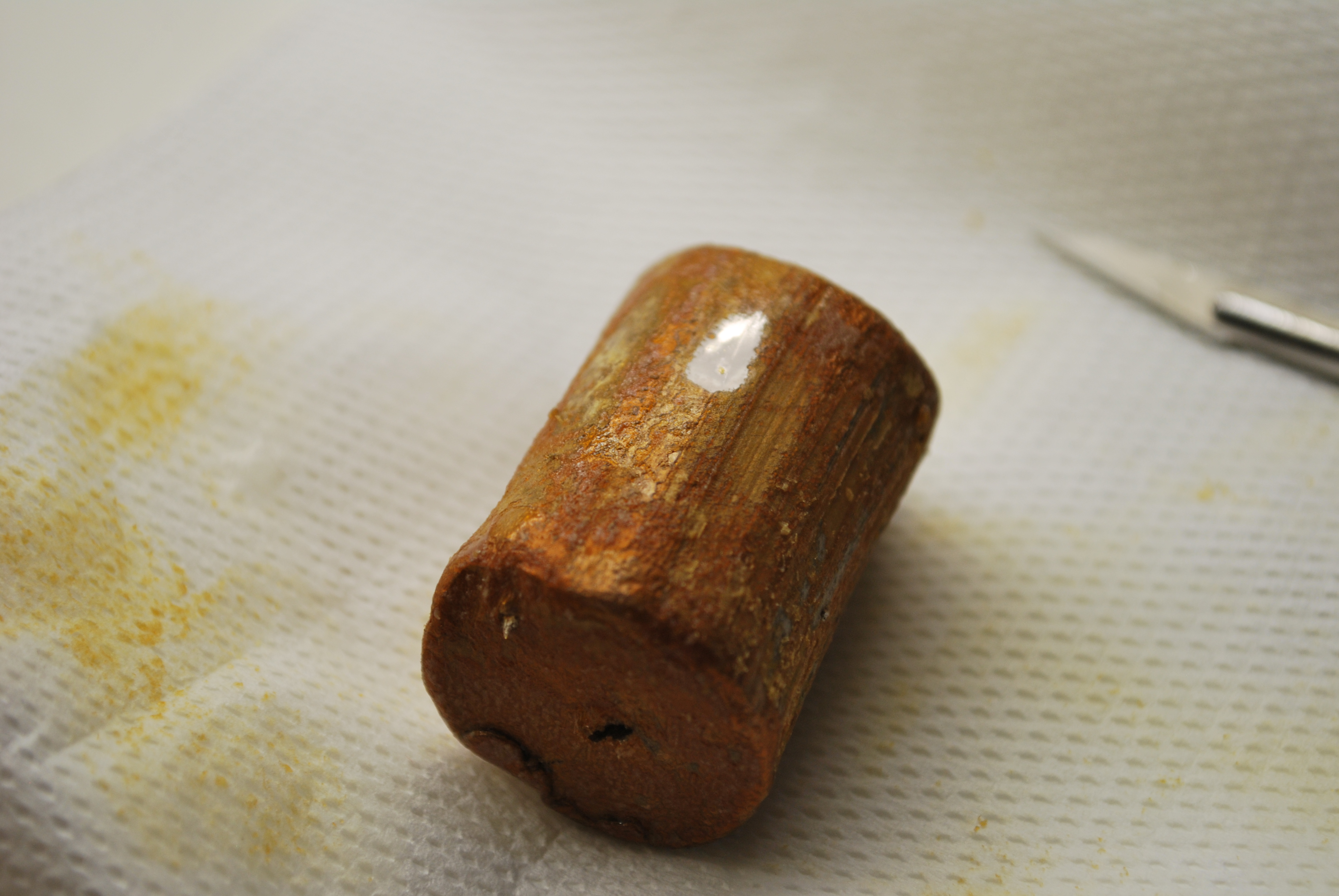
- Oxidised sodium after improper storage under contaminated hexane showing an orange crust of sodium superoxide.

Names
- IUPAC name sodium superoxide
- Other names sodium superoxide sodium dioxide

Identifiers
CAS Number	12034-12-7
3D model (JSmol)	Interactive image
ChemSpider	8305406
ECHA InfoCard	100.298.059
PubChem CID	61542
RTECS number	WE2860010
UNII	3GSN3JCJ5K
UN number	2547
CompTox Dashboard (EPA)	DTXSID30894055
- InChI: InChI=1S/Na.HO2/c;1-2/h;1H/q+1;/p-1 Key: TZACNHSIZFFYEH-UHFFFAOYSA-M
- SMILES: [O-][O].[Na+]

Properties
Chemical formula	NaO_{2}
Molar mass	54.9886 g/mol
Appearance	Yellow to orange crystalline solid
Density	2.2 g/cm^{3}
Melting point	551.7 °C (1,025.1 °F; 824.9 K)
Boiling point	Decomposes
Solubility in water	Decomposes
Basicity (pK_{b})	N/A

Structure
Crystal structure	cubic

Thermochemistry
Heat capacity (C)	72.1 J/mol K
Std molar entropy (S^{⦵}_{298})	115.9 J/mol K
Std enthalpy of formation (Δ_{f}H^{⦵}_{298})	−260.2 kJ/mol
Gibbs free energy (Δ_{f}G^{⦵})	−218.4 kJ/mol

Hazards
- GHS labelling
Pictograms	(GHS03: Oxidizing) (GHS05: Corrosive)
Signal word	Danger
Hazard statements	H271, H314
Precautionary statements	P210, P220, P260, P280, P303+P361+P353, P305+P351+P338
NFPA 704 (fire diamond)	3 0 1 OX
Flash point	Non flammable

Related compounds
Other anions	sodium oxide sodium peroxide
Other cations	Lithium superoxide Potassium superoxide Rubidium superoxide Caesium superoxide
- Except where otherwise noted, data are given for materials in their standard state (at 25 °C [77 °F], 100 kPa). verify (what is ?) Infobox references

Sodium superoxide is the inorganic compound with the formula NaO_{2}. This yellow-orange solid is a salt of the superoxide anion. It is an intermediate in the oxidation of sodium by oxygen.

== Preparation ==
NaO_{2} is prepared by treating sodium peroxide with oxygen at high pressures:

Na_{2}O_{2} + O_{2} → 2 NaO_{2}

It can also be prepared by careful oxygenation of a solution of sodium in cryogenic liquid ammonia:

Na(in NH_{3}) + O_{2} → NaO_{2}

Although the existence of a sodium oxide higher than peroxide was speculated since the 19th century, it was not until 1948 when American chemists were able to definitely synthesize it by the latter method.

== Properties ==
The product is paramagnetic, as expected for a salt of the O^{−}_{2} anion. It hydrolyses readily to give a mixture of sodium hydroxide, oxygen and hydrogen peroxide. It crystallizes in the NaCl motif.
