= Lithium peroxide =

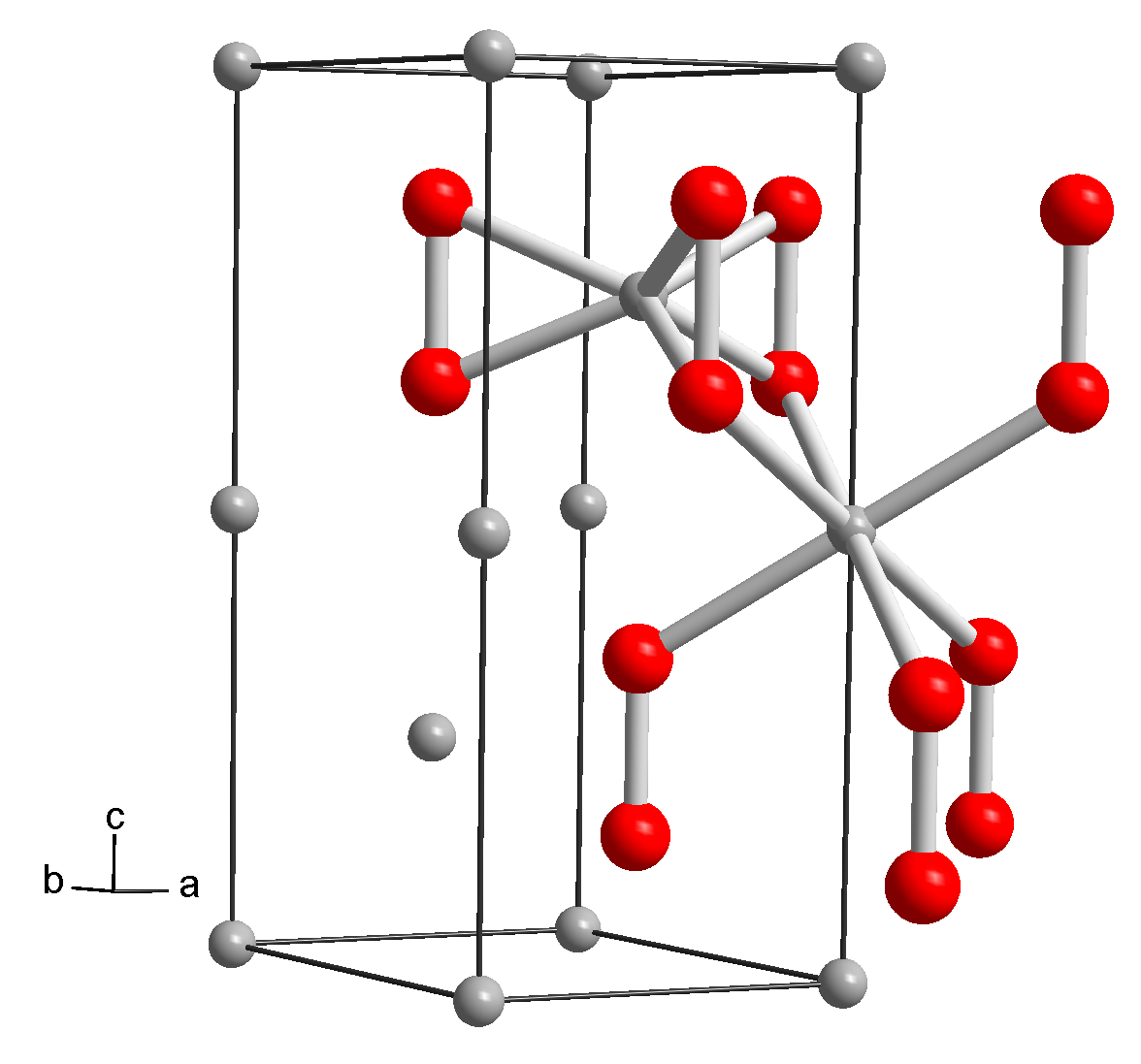
- __ Li^{+} __ O^{−}

Names
- IUPAC name Lithium peroxide
- Other names Dilithium peroxide Lithium(I) peroxide

Identifiers
| CAS Number | 12031-80-0 |
| 3D model (JSmol) | Interactive image |
| ChemSpider | 23787 |
| ECHA InfoCard | 100.031.585 |
| PubChem CID | 25489 |
| UNII | 9ANX556R5F |
| CompTox Dashboard (EPA) | DTXSID7065178 |
- InChI: InChI=1S/2Li.O2/c;;1-2/q2*+1;-2 Key: HPGPEWYJWRWDTP-UHFFFAOYSA-N; InChI=1/2Li.O2/c;;1-2/q2*+1;-2 Key: HPGPEWYJWRWDTP-UHFFFAOYAV
- SMILES: [Li+].[Li+].[O-][O-]

Properties
| Chemical formula | Li_{2}O_{2} |
| Molar mass | 45.885 g/mol |
| Appearance | fine, white powder |
| Odor | odorless |
| Density | 2.32 g/cm^{3} |
| Melting point | Decomposes to Li_{2}O at ~450°C but melts at 197°C |
| Boiling point | NA |
| Solubility in water | soluble |

Structure
| Crystal structure | hexagonal |

Thermochemistry
| Std enthalpy of formation (Δ_{f}H^{⦵}_{298}) | −13.83 kJ/g |

Hazards
- GHS labelling
| Pictograms | (GHS03: Oxidizing) (GHS05: Corrosive) |
| Signal word | Danger |
| Hazard statements | H271, H272, H314 |
| Precautionary statements | P210, P220, P221, P260, P264, P280, P283, P301+P330+P331, P303+P361+P353, P304+P340, P305+P351+P338, P306+P360, P310, P321, P363, P370+P378, P371+P380+P375, P405, P501 |
| NFPA 704 (fire diamond) | 3 0 2 OX |

Related compounds
| Other cations | Sodium peroxide Potassium peroxide Rubidium peroxide Caesium peroxide |
- Except where otherwise noted, data are given for materials in their standard state (at 25 °C [77 °F], 100 kPa). verify (what is ?) Infobox references

Lithium peroxide is the inorganic compound with the formula Li_{2}O_{2}. Lithium peroxide is a white solid, and unlike most other alkali metal peroxides, it is nonhygroscopic. Because of its high oxygen:mass and oxygen:volume ratios, the solid has been used to remove CO_{2} from and release O_{2} to the atmosphere in spacecraft.

== Preparation ==
It is prepared by the reaction of hydrogen peroxide and lithium hydroxide. This reaction initially produces lithium hydroperoxide:

LiOH + H_{2}O_{2} → LiOOH + H_{2}O

This lithium hydroperoxide may exist as lithium peroxide monoperoxohydrate trihydrate (Li_{2}O_{2}·H_{2}O_{2}·3H_{2}O). Dehydration of this material gives the anhydrous peroxide salt:

2 LiOOH → Li_{2}O_{2} + H_{2}O_{2}

Li_{2}O_{2} decomposes at about 450 °C to give lithium oxide:

2 Li_{2}O_{2} → 2 Li_{2}O + O_{2}

The structure of solid Li_{2}O_{2} has been determined by X-ray crystallography and density functional theory. The solid features eclipsed "ethane-like" Li_{6}O_{2} subunits with an O-O distance of around 1.5 Å.

== Uses ==
=== Air purification ===
It is used in air purifiers where weight is important, e.g., spacecraft or other sealed spaces and apparatuses to absorb carbon dioxide and release oxygen in the reaction:

Li_{2}O_{2} + CO_{2} → Li_{2}CO_{3} + 1/2 O_{2}

Similar to the reaction of lithium hydroxide with carbon dioxide to release 1 Li_{2}CO_{3} and 1 H_{2}O, lithium peroxide has high absorption capacity and absorbs more CO_{2} than does the same weight of lithium hydroxide and offers the bonus of releasing oxygen instead of water.

=== Styrene polymerization ===
Lithium peroxide can also act as a catalyst for polymerization of styrene to polystyrene. The polymerization of styrene to polystyrene typically involves the use of radical initiators via the free radical chain mechanism but lithium peroxide can also initiate radical polymerization reactions under certain conditions, although not as widely used.

=== Lithium-air battery ===
The reversible lithium peroxide reaction is the basis for a prototype lithium–air battery. Using oxygen from the atmosphere allows the battery to eliminate storage of oxygen for its reaction, saving battery weight and size.

== See also ==
- Lithium oxide
- Lithium monoxide anion
