= Potassium ozonide =

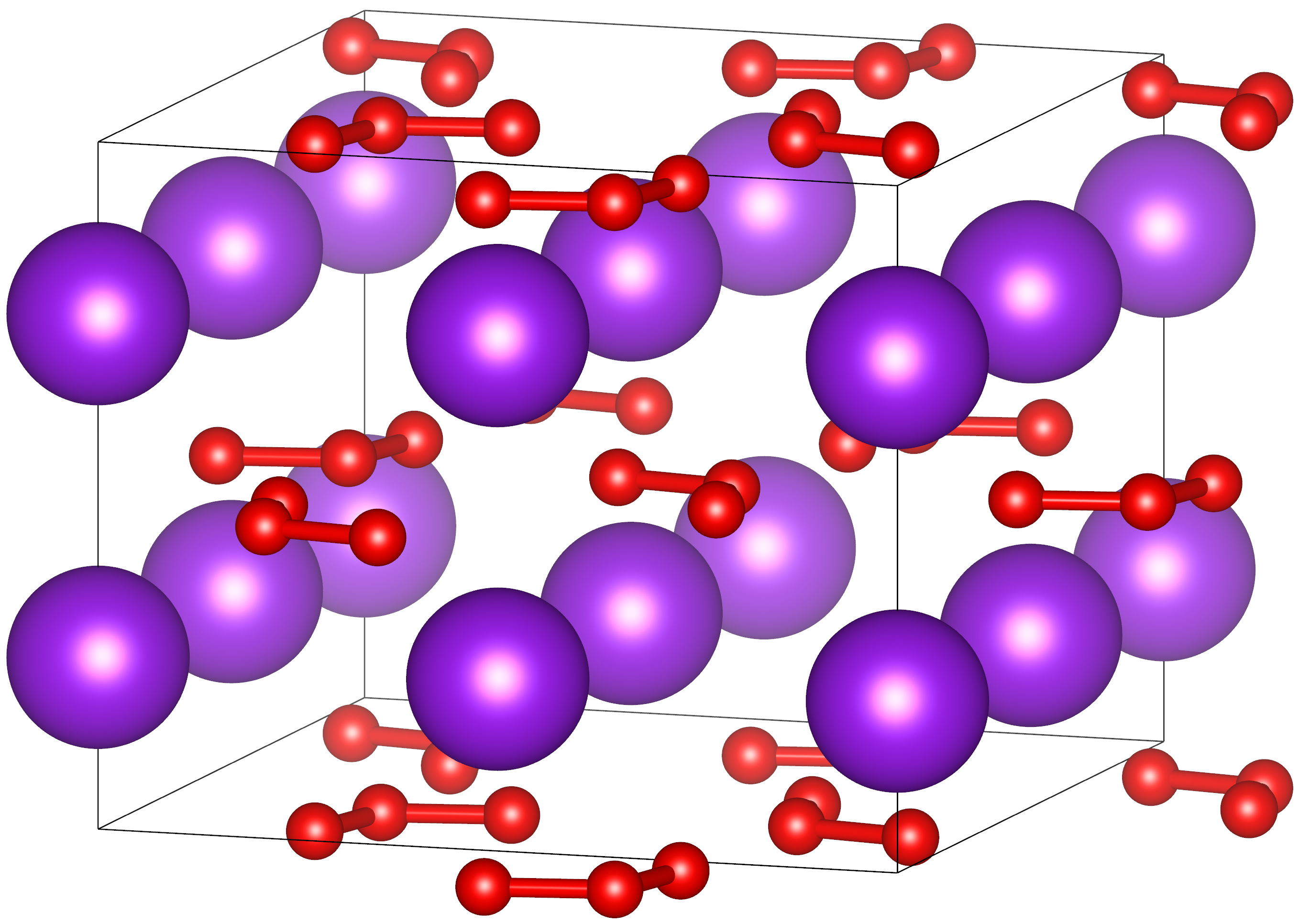

Identifiers
CAS Number	12030-89-6
3D model (JSmol)	Interactive image
PubChem CID	160885133
- InChI: InChI=1S/K.HO3/c;1-3-2/h;1H/q+1;/p-1 Key: VQZSGFOWLNUPQM-UHFFFAOYSA-M
- SMILES: [K+].[O-]O[O]

Properties
Chemical formula	KO_{3}
Molar mass	87.095 g·mol^{−1}
Appearance	Red crystalline solid
Density	1.990 g/cm^{3}
Melting point	25 °C (77 °F; 298 K) (decomposes)
Solubility in water	Reacts
Solubility	Soluble in liquid anhydrous ammonia
Refractive index (n_{D})	1.39

Structure
Space group	I4/mcm
Lattice constant	a = 8.597 Å, c = 7.080 Å
Formula units (Z)	8

Related compounds
Other anions	Potassium fluoride Potassium chloride Potassium bromide Potassium iodide
Other cations	Lithium ozonide Sodium ozonide Rubidium ozonide Caesium ozonide
Related potassium oxides	Potassium oxide Potassium peroxide Potassium superoxide
- Except where otherwise noted, data are given for materials in their standard state (at 25 °C [77 °F], 100 kPa). Infobox references

Potassium ozonide is an oxygen rich compound of potassium. It is an ozonide, meaning it contains the ozonide anion (O_{3}^{−}). In polarized light, it shows pleochroism. Hybrid functional calculations have predicted the compound is an insulator with a band gap of 3.0 eV, and has magnetic behavior which departs from the Curie–Weiss law.

The compound can be created by reacting ozone with potassium hydroxide, but the yield is quite low, only 5-10%.

6 KOH + 4 O_{3} → 4 KO_{3} + 2 KOH(H_{2}O) + O_{2}

The compound is metastable, and will decompose to potassium superoxide and oxygen, especially if there is any water in the atmosphere. Long-term storage in very dry atmosphere is possible below around 0 °C.

KO_{3} → KO_{2} + ½ O_{2}

This compound reacts with water to form potassium hydroxide and potassium superoxide.
