= Caesium ozonide =

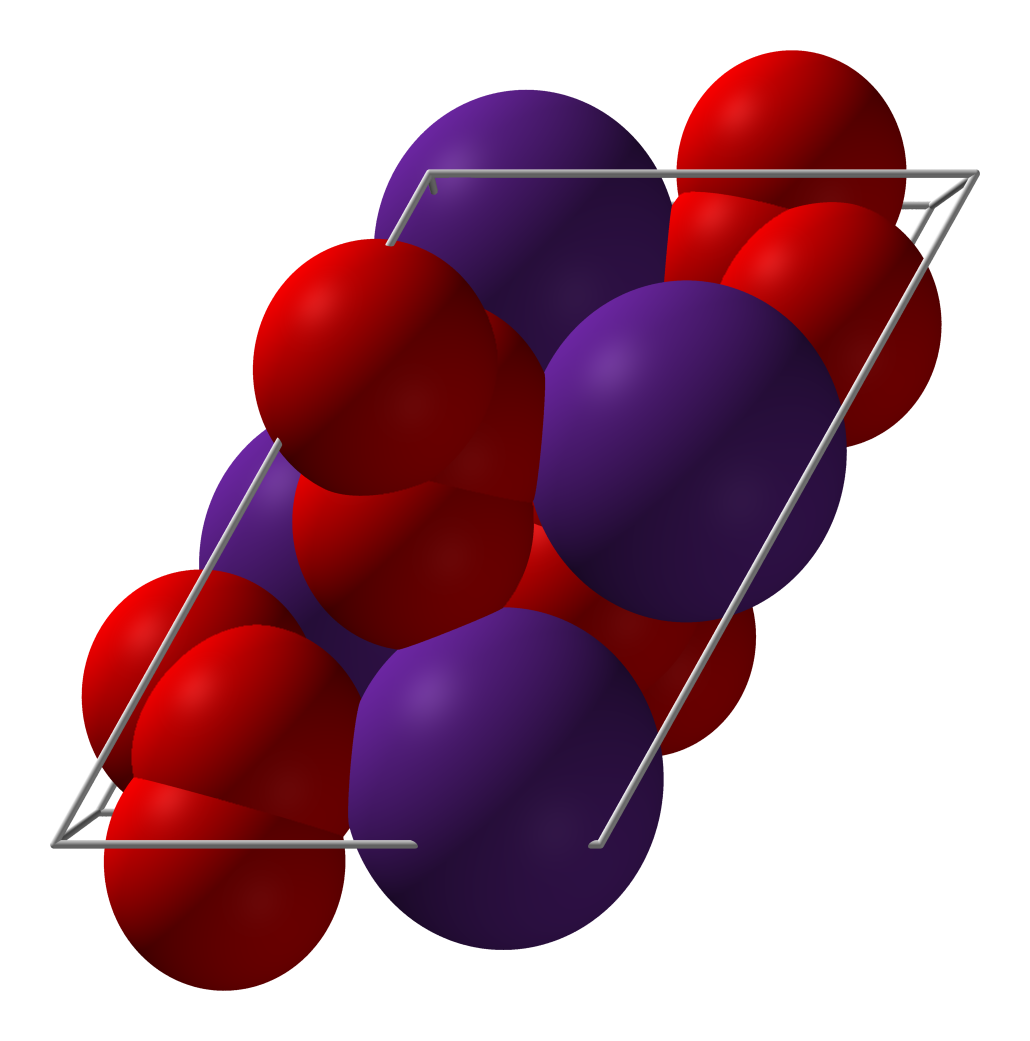
- Caesium, Cs Oxygen, O

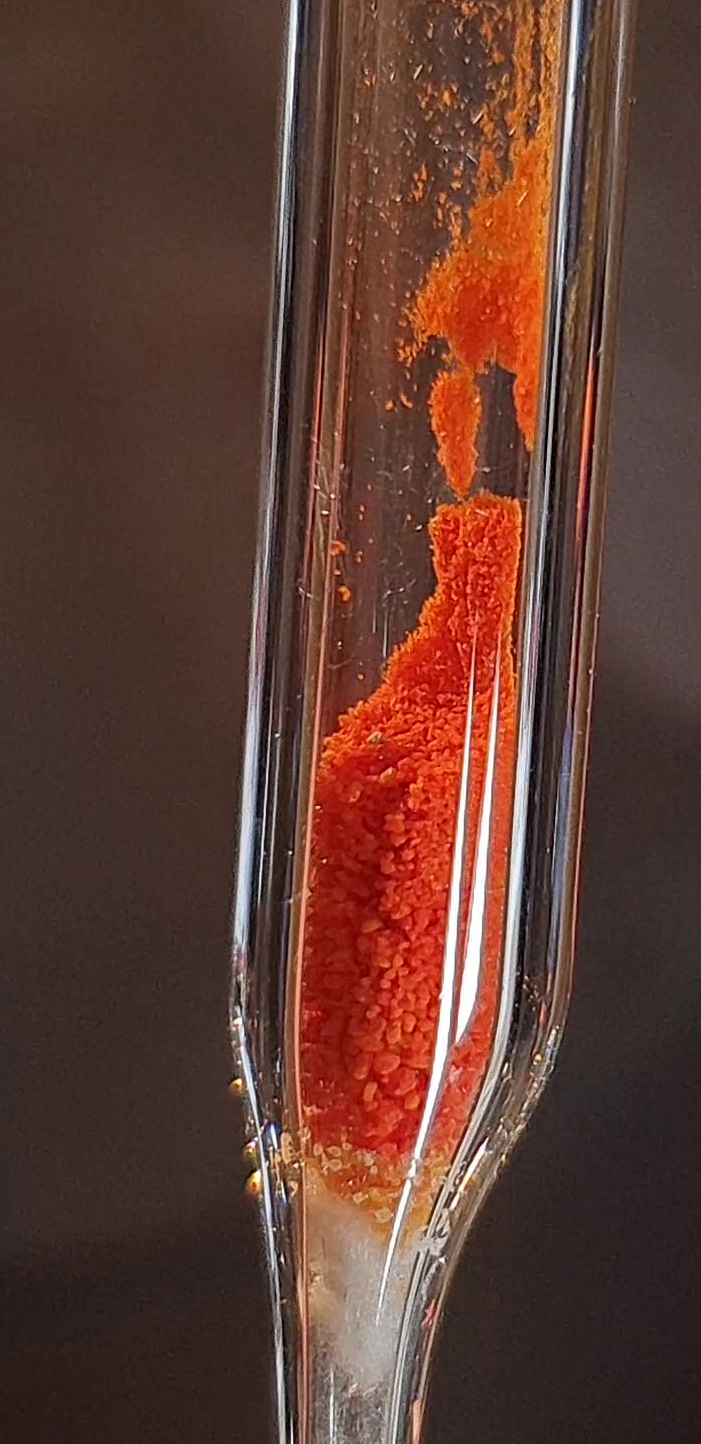
- Caesium ozonide contaminated with caesium superoxide

Names
- IUPAC name Caesium ozonide

Identifiers
CAS Number	12053-67-7
3D model (JSmol)	Interactive image
- InChI: InChI=1S/Cs.HO3/c;1-3-2/h;1H/q+1;/p-1 Key: SLQRFWQASSLHIF-UHFFFAOYSA-M
- SMILES: [Cs+].[O-]O[O]

Properties
Chemical formula	CsO_{3}
Molar mass	180.902 g·mol^{−1}
Appearance	Dark cherry red powder
Density	3.19 g/cm^{3}
Melting point	85 °C (185 °F; 358 K) (decomposes)

Related compounds
Other anions	Caesium fluoride; Caesium chloride; Caesium bromide; Caesium iodide
Other cations	Lithium ozonide; Sodium ozonide; Potassium ozonide; Rubidium ozonide
Related caesium oxides	Caesium suboxide; Caesium monoxide; Caesium peroxide; Caesium sesquioxide; Caesium superoxide
- Except where otherwise noted, data are given for materials in their standard state (at 25 °C [77 °F], 100 kPa). Infobox references

Caesium ozonide is an oxygen-rich chemical compound of caesium, with the chemical formula CsO_{3}. It consists of caesium cations Cs^{+} and ozonide anions O^{−}_{3}. It can be formed by reacting ozone with caesium superoxide:

CsO_{2} + O_{3} → CsO_{3} + O_{2}

The compound reacts strongly with any water in the air forming caesium hydroxide.

4 CsO_{3} + 2 H_{2}O → 4 CsOH + 5 O_{2}

If heated to between 70 and 100 °C, caesium ozonide will quickly decompose to caesium superoxide (CsO_{2}). In fact, the compound is metastable to decomposition into caesium superoxide, slowly decomposing at room temperature, but can remain intact for months if stored at −20 °C.

Above around 8 °C, the crystal structure is of the caesium chloride type, with the ozonide ion in place of the chloride ion. At lower temperatures, the crystal structure changes to a structure identical to rubidium ozonide (RbO_{3}), with space group P2_{1}/c.
