= Mitochondrial ROS =

Reactive oxygen species produced by mitochondria

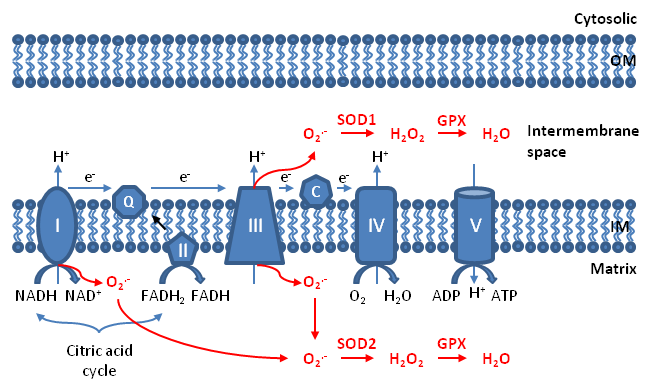
Production of mitochondrial ROS, mitochondrial ROS

Mitochondrial ROS (mtROS or mROS) are reactive oxygen species (ROS) that are produced by mitochondria. Generation of mitochondrial ROS mainly takes place at the electron transport chain located on the inner mitochondrial membrane during the process of oxidative phosphorylation. Leakage of electrons at complex I and complex III from electron transport chains leads to partial reduction of oxygen to form superoxide. Subsequently, superoxide is quickly dismutated to hydrogen peroxide by two dismutases including superoxide dismutase 2 (SOD2) in mitochondrial matrix and superoxide dismutase 1 (SOD1) in mitochondrial intermembrane space. Collectively, both superoxide and hydrogen peroxide generated in this process are considered as mitochondrial ROS.

Once thought as merely the by-products of cellular metabolism, mitochondrial ROS are increasingly viewed as important signaling molecules, whose levels of generation at 11 currently-identified sites vary depending on cellular energy supply and demand. At low levels, mitochondrial ROS are considered to be important for metabolic adaptation as seen in hypoxia. Mitochondrial ROS, stimulated by danger signals such as lysophosphatidylcholine and Toll-like receptor 4 and Toll-like receptor 2 bacterial ligands lipopolysaccharide (LPS) and lipopeptides, are involved in regulating inflammatory response. Finally, high levels of mitochondrial ROS activate apoptosis/autophagy pathways capable of inducing cell death.

== COVID-19 ==
Monocytes/macrophages are the most enriched immune cell types in the lungs of COVID-19 patients and appear to have a central role in the pathogenicity of the disease. These cells adapt their metabolism upon infection and become highly glycolytic, which facilitates SARS-CoV-2 replication. The infection triggers mitochondrial ROS production, which induces stabilization of hypoxia-inducible factor-1α (HIF1A) and consequently promotes glycolysis. HIF1A-induced changes in monocyte metabolism by SARS-CoV-2 infection directly inhibit T cell response and reduce epithelial cell survival. Targeting mitochondrial ROS may have great therapeutic potential for the development of novel drugs to treat patients with coronavirus.

== Aging ==
Mitochondrial ROS can promote cellular senescence and aging phenotypes in the skin of mice. Ordinarily mitochondrial SOD2 protects against mitochondrial ROS. Epidermal cells in mutant mice with a genetic SOD2 deficiency undergo cellular senescence, nuclear DNA damage, and irreversible arrest of proliferation in a portion of their keratinocytes.

Mutant mice with a conditional deficiency for mitochondrial SOD2 in connective tissue have an accelerated aging phenotype. This aging phenotype includes weight loss, skin atrophy, kyphosis (curvature of the spine), osteoporosis, muscle degeneration and reduced life span.

== DNA damage ==
Mitochondrial ROS attack DNA readily, generating a variety of DNA damages such as oxidized bases and strand breaks. The major mechanism that cells use to repair oxidized bases such as 8-hydroxyguanine, formamidopyrimidine and 5-hydroxyuracil is base excision repair (BER). BER occurs in both the cell nucleus and in mitochondria.
