= Manganese in biology =

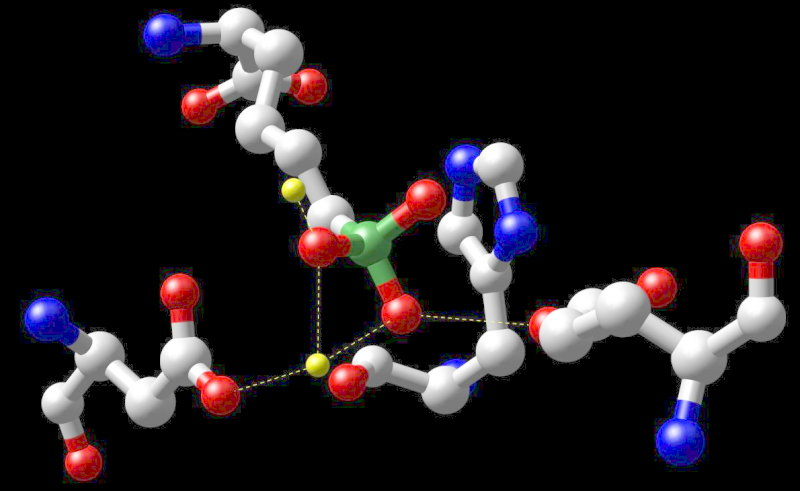
Reactive center of arginase complexed with boronic acid inhibitor – the two visible smaller manganese atoms are shown in yellow.

Manganese is an essential biological element in all organisms. It is used in many enzymes and proteins. It is essential in plants.

== Biochemistry ==
The classes of enzymes that have manganese cofactors include oxidoreductases, transferases, hydrolases, lyases, isomerases and ligases. Other enzymes containing manganese are arginase and Mn-containing superoxide dismutase (Mn-SOD). Also, the enzyme class of reverse transcriptases of many retroviruses (though not lentiviruses such as HIV) contains manganese. Manganese-containing polypeptides are the diphtheria toxin, lectins and integrins.

== Biological role in humans ==
Manganese is an essential human dietary element. It is present as a coenzyme in several biological processes, which include macronutrient metabolism, bone formation, and free radical defense systems. It is a critical component in dozens of proteins and enzymes. The human body contains about 12 mg of manganese, mostly in the bones. The soft tissue remainder is concentrated in the liver and kidneys. In the human brain, the manganese is bound to manganese metalloproteins, most notably glutamine synthetase in astrocytes.

=== Nutrition ===
==== Dietary recommendations ====
Current AIs of Mn by age group and sex
Males		Females	
Age	AI (mg/day)	Age	AI (mg/day)
1–3	1.2	1–3	1.2
4–8	1.5	4–8	1.5
9–13	1.9	9–13	1.6
14–18	2.2	14–18	1.6
≥19	2.3	≥19	1.8
≥19	2.3	≥19	pregnant: 2
≥19	2.3	≥19	lactating: 2.6

The U.S. Institute of Medicine (IOM) updated Estimated Average Requirements (EARs) and Recommended Dietary Allowances (RDAs) for minerals in 2001. For manganese, there was not sufficient information to set EARs and RDAs, so needs are described as estimates for Adequate Intakes (AIs). As for safety, the IOM sets Tolerable upper intake levels (ULs) for vitamins and minerals when evidence is sufficient. In the case of manganese, the adult UL is set at 11 mg/day. Collectively the EARs, RDAs, AIs and ULs are referred to as Dietary Reference Intakes (DRIs). Manganese deficiency is rare.

The European Food Safety Authority (EFSA) refers to the collective set of information as Dietary Reference Values, with Population Reference Intake (PRI) instead of RDA, and Average Requirement instead of EAR. AI and UL are defined the same as in the United States. For people ages 15 and older, the AI is set at 3.0 mg/day. AIs for pregnancy and lactation is 3.0 mg/day. For children ages 1–14 years, the AIs increase with age from 0.5 to 2.0 mg/day. The adult AIs are higher than the U.S. RDAs. The EFSA reviewed the same safety question and decided that there was insufficient information to set a UL.

For U.S. food and dietary supplement labeling purposes, the amount in a serving is expressed as a percent of Daily Value (%DV). For manganese labeling purposes, 100% of the Daily Value was 2.0 mg, but as of 27 May 2016 it was revised to 2.3 mg to bring it into agreement with the RDA. A table of the old and new adult daily values is provided at Reference Daily Intake.

=== Toxicity ===
Excessive exposure or intake may lead to a condition known as manganism, a neurodegenerative disorder that causes dopaminergic neuronal death and symptoms similar to Parkinson's disease.

=== Deficiency ===
Manganese deficiency in humans, which is rare, results in a number of medical problems. Many common vitamin and mineral supplement products fail to include manganese in their compositions. A relatively high dietary intake of other minerals, such as iron, magnesium, and calcium, may inhibit the proper intake of manganese. A deficiency of manganese causes skeletal deformation in animals and inhibits the production of collagen in wound healing.

== Toxicity in marine life ==
Many enzymatic systems need Mn to function, but in high levels, Mn can become toxic. One environmental reason Mn levels can increase in seawater is when hypoxic periods occur. Since 1990, there have been reports of Mn accumulation in marine organisms including fish, crustaceans, mollusks, and echinoderms. Specific tissues are targets in different species, including the gills, brain, blood, kidney, and liver/hepatopancreas. Physiological effects have been reported in these species. Mn can affect the renewal of immunocytes and their functionality, such as phagocytosis and activation of prophenoloxidase, suppressing the organisms' immune systems. This makes the organisms more susceptible to infections. As climate change occurs, pathogen distributions increase, and in order for organisms to survive and defend themselves against these pathogens, they need a healthy, strong immune system. If their systems are compromised from high Mn levels, they will not be able to fight off these pathogens and die.

== Biological role in bacteria ==
Mn-SOD is the type of superoxide dismutase (SOD) present in eukaryotic mitochondria, and also in most bacteria (this finding is consistent with the bacterial origin theory of mitochondria). The Mn-SOD enzyme is probably one of the most ancient, for nearly all organisms living in the presence of oxygen use it to deal with the toxic effects of the superoxide (O^{−}_{2}) anion, formed from the 1-electron reduction of dioxygen. The exceptions, which are all bacteria, include Lactobacillus plantarum and related lactobacilli, which use a different nonenzymatic mechanism with manganese (Mn^{2+}) ions complexed with polyphosphate, suggesting a path of evolution for this function in aerobic organisms.

== Biological role in plants ==
Manganese is also important in photosynthetic oxygen evolution in chloroplasts in plants. The oxygen-evolving complex (OEC) is a part of photosystem II contained in the thylakoid membranes of chloroplasts; it is responsible for the terminal photooxidation of water during the light reactions of photosynthesis. It has a metalloenzyme core containing four atoms of manganese. To fulfill this requirement, most broad-spectrum plant fertilizers contain manganese.
