= Superoxide dismutase mimetics =

Synthetic compounds

Superoxide dismutase (SOD) mimetics are synthetic compounds that mimic the native superoxide dismutase enzyme. SOD mimetics effectively convert the superoxide anion (O^{−}_{2}), a reactive oxygen species, into hydrogen peroxide, which is further converted into water by catalase. Reactive oxygen species are natural byproducts of cellular respiration and cause oxidative stress and cell damage, which has been linked to causing cancers, neurodegeneration, age-related declines in health, and inflammatory diseases. SOD mimetics are a prime interest in therapeutic treatment of oxidative stress because of their smaller size, longer half-life, and similarity in function to the native enzyme.

The chemical structure of SOD mimetics generally consists of manganese, iron, or copper (and zinc) coordination complexes. Salen-manganese(III) complexes contain aromatic ring structures that increase the lipid solubility and cell permeability of the entire complex. Manganese (II) and iron (III) complexes are commonly used due to their high kinetic and thermodynamic stability, increasing the half-life of the mimetic. However, manganese-based SOD mimetics are found to be more therapeutically effective than their counterparts due to their low toxicity, higher catalytic activity, and increased stability in vivo.

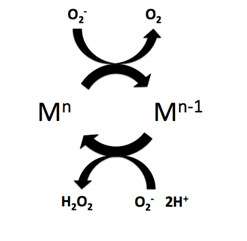
Dismutation of superoxide anions with a metal-based catalyzer (denoted by M) in a redox cycle. The M^{n} and M^{n−1} show the oxidized and reduced forms of the metallic center, respectively. The metallic center is able to convert a superoxide anion to oxygen in the first half reaction by accepting an electron. In the second half reaction, the reduced metal atom donates the electron to another superoxide anion in order to form hydrogen peroxide, regenerating the metal ion in its original oxidation state.

== Mechanism of action ==
Similar to the native enzyme’s mechanism, the manganese complexes undergo a reversible oxidation/reduction cycle. In the first half reaction manganese covalently coordinates to the superoxide anion on its oxygen binding site, through inner-sphere electron transfer. (M^{n}) is reduced by superoxide, yielding molecular oxygen and a reduced form of manganese (M^{n−1}). The metal (M^{n−1}) is then regenerated to its former oxidation state (M^{n}) by reducing a second superoxide molecule to hydrogen peroxide.

1. M^{n} + O^{−}_{2} → M^{n−1} + O_{2}
2. M^{n−1} + O^{−}_{2} + 2H^{+} → M^{n} + H_{2}O_{2}
Net: M^{n} + 2O^{−}_{2} + 2H^{+} → M^{n} + O_{2} + H_{2}O_{2}

The metal complex must be electron deficient in nature, allowing it to accept electrons from the superoxide. This is accomplished by coordinating electron-withdrawing ligands around the metal center. Since the mechanism of SOD mimetics involves a redox cycle, the catalytic activity of the SOD mimetic is partially dependent on the reduction potential of the metal center. Coordinated ligands of SOD mimetics fine-tune the chemical properties of the complex and are designed to match the 300mV reduction potential of the native enzyme.

== Manganese-based SODs ==
The most prominent SOD mimetics are: manganese porphyrin complexes, manganese (II) penta-azamacrocyclic complexes, and manganese (III) salen complexes.

=== Manganese porphyrin ===
Rotating model of MnTBAP (Mn(III)tetrakis (4-benzoic acid) porphyrin), a manganese-porphyrin compound with proposed superoxide dismutase activity. Grey, blue, red, purple, and white balls represent carbon, nitrogen, oxygen, manganese, and hydrogen atoms, respectively. The counter ion has been omitted from the structure.

Porphyrin SOD mimetics consist of manganese (III) centers coordinated by a single porphyrin ring. Although both complexes are effective porphyrin-based superoxide dismutases, MnTBAP [Mn(III)tetrakis (4-benzoic acid) porphyrin] was shown to better protect the cells from oxidative damages compared to ZnTBAP ((Zinc (III) tetrakis (4-benzoic acid)porphyrin chloride)) in vivo. Researchers found MnTBAP reversed obesity and induced faster wound healing in diabetic mice. MnTBAP has the ability to prevent formation of cytotoxic peroxynitrite, a hazardous byproduct of superoxide reacting with nitric oxide, and induces healing process of wounds. MnTMPyP [manganese (III) tetrakis (1-methyl-4-pyridyl) porphyrin], another porphyrin molecule, was also found effective in relieving oxidative stress caused by peroxynitrite in intracellular and extracellular conditions. Manganese-porphyrin complexes reduced the damaging effects of radiation treatment in mice.

=== Manganese (II) penta-azamacrocyclic: M40401/3 ===
Rotating model of M40401, a manganese-containing superoxide dismutase mimic. Grey, blue, purple, and white balls represent carbon, nitrogen, manganese, and hydrogen atoms, respectively. The counter ion has been omitted from the structure.

M40403 and M40401 are Manganese (II) Penta-Azamacrocyclic complexes with SOD mimetic properties. Mn (II) complexes are found to be more stable in vivo and have high specificity for the superoxide anion, preventing unwanted interactions with biologically important molecules. They are characterized as having a small size, high stability, and higher catalytic efficiency than superoxide dismutase, especially in more acidic environments. M40403 was found effective in reducing oxidative tissue damage induced by total body irradiation. M40401 is similar in structure to M40403, but it has two additional methyl groups, causing a one hundredfold increase in catalytic activity in treatment of ischemia-reperfusion injuries. M40401 was also found to protect against hypoxic-ischemic brain injury.

=== Manganese (III) salen ===
Mn (III) Salen complexes are found to be more stable than other iron or manganese mimics of superoxide dismutase. In certain synthesized forms, aromatic rings are coordinated with the manganese center, increasing the lipid solubility of the entire complex, allowing it to pass the cellular membrane.

== Life-span extension ==
Treatment of the nematode Caenorhabditis elegans with superoxide dismutase/catalase (SOD/catalase) mimetics has been reported to extend life-span. Mice with deficient SOD2 die prematurely, exhibiting severe metabolic and mitochondrial defects. Treatment of such mice with SOD/catalase mimetics extended their life-span by as much as three-fold. Treatment of wild-type mice with a carboxyfullerene SOD mimetic not only reduced age-associated oxidative stress and mitochondrial radical production, but significantly extended life-span. This treatment also rescued age-related cognitive impairment. These findings suggest that oxidative stress is an important determinant of life-span.
