= SOD1 =

Protein-coding gene in humans

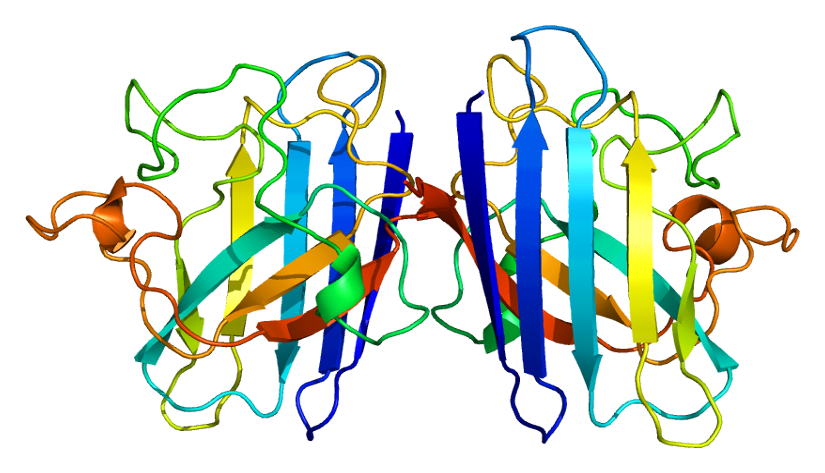

Identifiers
- Aliases: SOD1, ALS, ALS1, HEL-S-44, IPOA, SOD, hSod1, homodimer, superoxide dismutase 1, soluble, superoxide dismutase 1, STAHP
- External IDs: OMIM: 147450; MGI: 98351; GeneCards: SOD1
Available structures
PDB	Ortholog search: PDBe RCSB
PDB	List of PDB id codes 1AZV, 1BA9, 1DSW, 1FUN, 1HL4, 1HL5, 1KMG, 1L3N, 1MFM, 1N18, 1N19, 1OEZ, 1OZT, 1OZU, 1P1V, 1PTZ, 1PU0, 1RK7, 1SOS, 1SPD, 1UXL, 1UXM, 2AF2, 2C9S, 2C9U, 2C9V, 2GBT, 2GBU, 2GBV, 2LU5, 2MP3, 2NNX, 2R27, 2V0A, 2VR6, 2VR7, 2VR8, 2WKO, 2WYT, 2WYZ, 2WZ0, 2WZ5, 2WZ6, 2XJK, 2XJL, 2ZKW, 2ZKX, 2ZKY, 3CQP, 3CQQ, 3ECU, 3ECV, 3ECW, 3GQF, 3GTV, 3GZO, 3GZP, 3GZQ, 3H2P, 3H2Q, 3HFF, 3K91, 3KH3, 3KH4, 3LTV, 3QQD, 3RE0, 3T5W, 4A7G, 4A7Q, 4A7S, 4A7T, 4A7U, 4A7V, 4B3E, 4BCY, 4BCZ, 4BD4, 4FF9, 4MCM, 4MCN, 4NIN, 4NIP, 4OH2, 4XCR
Enzyme activity
EC #	BRENDA	ExPASy	KEGG	MetaCyc
1.15.1.1	↗	↗	↗	↗

Gene location (Human)
Chr.	Chromosome 21 (human)
Band	21q22.11	Start	31,659,666 bp
Band	21q22.11	End	31,668,931 bp

Gene location (Mouse)
Chr.	Chromosome 16 (mouse)
Band	16 C3.3|16 51.56 cM	Start	90,017,642 bp
Band	16 C3.3|16 51.56 cM	End	90,023,217 bp
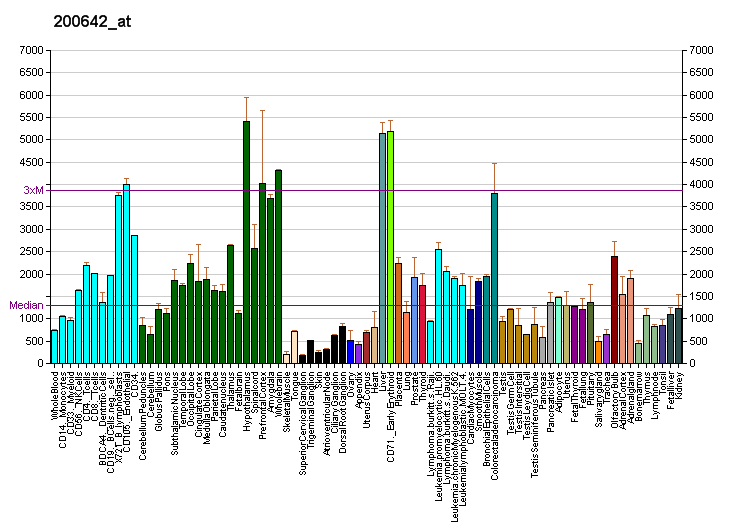
RNA expression pattern
Bgee	Human / Mouse (ortholog); Top expressed in: pons; pars compacta; spinal ganglia; lateral nuclear group of thalamus; superior vestibular nucleus; pars reticulata; right lobe of liver; Brodmann area 10; right adrenal cortex; hypothalamus / Top expressed in: otolith organ; utricle; Paneth cell; cumulus cell; fossa; primary oocyte; vestibular sensory epithelium; Epithelium of choroid plexus; facial motor nucleus; condyle; More reference expression data
BioGPS	More reference expression data
Gene ontology
Molecular function	metal ion binding; enzyme binding; oxidoreductase activity; superoxide dismutase activity; protein homodimerization activity; zinc ion binding; protein binding; copper ion binding; protein phosphatase 2B binding; chaperone binding; antioxidant activity; identical protein binding; superoxide dismutase copper chaperone activity
Cellular component	cytoplasm; cytosol; mitochondrial intermembrane space; extracellular region; mitochondrion; neuron projection; dendrite cytoplasm; dense core granule; nucleus; myelin sheath; peroxisome; lysosome; extracellular exosome; extracellular matrix; plasma membrane; secretory granule; nucleoplasm; soma; mitochondrial matrix; cytoplasmic vesicle; axon cytoplasm; extracellular space; protein-containing complex
Biological process	negative regulation of neuron apoptotic process; muscle cell cellular homeostasis; response to copper ion; placenta development; response to amphetamine; positive regulation of catalytic activity; response to heat; response to organic substance; anterograde axonal transport; spermatogenesis; response to ethanol; neurofilament cytoskeleton organization; heart contraction; embryo implantation; locomotory behavior; thymus development; removal of superoxide radicals; regulation of GTPase activity; transmission of nerve impulse; response to antibiotic; myeloid cell homeostasis; response to oxidative stress; reactive oxygen species metabolic process; regulation of T cell differentiation in thymus; retina homeostasis; response to nutrient levels; hydrogen peroxide biosynthetic process; regulation of protein kinase activity; negative regulation of cholesterol biosynthetic process; cellular response to potassium ion; retrograde axonal transport; glutathione metabolic process; response to antipsychotic drug; negative regulation of apoptotic process; cellular response to cadmium ion; response to carbon monoxide; regulation of blood pressure; response to axon injury; relaxation of vascular associated smooth muscle; ovarian follicle development; cellular response to ATP; response to hydrogen peroxide; superoxide metabolic process; peripheral nervous system myelin maintenance; response to superoxide; positive regulation of cytokine production; regulation of multicellular organism growth; ageing; platelet degranulation; hearing; superoxide anion generation; auditory receptor cell stereocilium organization; regulation of mitochondrial membrane potential; positive regulation of oxidative stress-induced intrinsic apoptotic signaling pathway; positive regulation of apoptotic process; positive regulation of superoxide anion generation; regulation of organ growth; cellular iron ion homeostasis; response to reactive oxygen species; cellular response to oxidative stress; interleukin-12-mediated signaling pathway; negative regulation of inflammatory response; positive regulation of phagocytosis
Sources:Amigo / QuickGO
Orthologs
Databases	NCBI: entry; OMA: entry
Species	Human	Mouse
Entrez	6647	20655
Ensembl	ENSG00000142168	ENSMUSG00000022982
UniProt	P00441	P08228
RefSeq (mRNA)	NM_000454	NM_011434
RefSeq (protein)	NP_000445	NP_035564
Location (UCSC)	Chr 21: 31.66 – 31.67 Mb	Chr 16: 90.02 – 90.02 Mb
PubMed search
- Wikidata
View/Edit Human	View/Edit Mouse

Superoxide dismutase [Cu-Zn] also known as superoxide dismutase 1 or hSod1 is an enzyme that in humans is encoded by the SOD1 gene, located on chromosome 21. SOD1 is one of three human superoxide dismutases. It is implicated in apoptosis, familial amyotrophic lateral sclerosis and Parkinson's disease.

== Structure ==
SOD1 is a 32 kDa homodimer which forms a beta barrel (β-barrel) and contains an intramolecular disulfide bond and a binuclear Cu/Zn site in each subunit. This Cu/Zn site holds the copper and a zinc ion and is responsible for catalyzing the disproportionation of superoxide to hydrogen peroxide and dioxygen. The maturation process of this protein is complex and not fully understood, involving the selective binding of copper and zinc ions, formation of the intra-subunit disulfide bond between Cys-57 and Cys-146, and dimerization of the two subunits. The copper chaperone for Sod1 (CCS) facilitates copper insertion and disulfide oxidation. Although SOD1 is synthesized in the cytosol and can mature there, the fraction of expressed but still immature SOD1 that is targeted to the mitochondria must be inserted into the intermembrane space. There, it forms the disulfide bond, though not metalation, required for its maturation. The mature protein is highly stable, but unstable when in its metal-free and disulfide-reduced forms. This manifests in vitro, as the loss of metal ions results in increased SOD1 aggregation, and in disease models, where low metalation is observed for insoluble SOD1. Moreover, the surface-exposed reduced cysteines could participate in disulfide crosslinking and, thus, aggregation.

== Function ==
SOD1 binds copper and zinc ions and is one of three superoxide dismutases responsible for destroying free superoxide radicals in the body. The encoded isozyme is a soluble cytoplasmic and mitochondrial intermembrane space protein, acting as a homodimer to convert naturally occurring, but harmful, superoxide radicals to molecular oxygen and hydrogen peroxide. Hydrogen peroxide can then be broken down by another enzyme called catalase.

SOD1 has been postulated to localize to the outer mitochondrial membrane (OMM), where superoxide anions would be generated, or the intermembrane space. The exact mechanisms for its localization remains unknown, but its aggregation to the OMM has been attributed to its association with BCL-2. Wildtype SOD1 has demonstrated antiapoptotic properties in neural cultures, while mutant SOD1 has been observed to promote apoptosis in spinal cord mitochondria, but not in liver mitochondria, though it is equally expressed in both. Two models suggest SOD1 inhibits apoptosis by interacting with BCL-2 proteins or the mitochondria itself.

== Clinical significance ==
=== Role in oxidative stress ===
Most notably, SOD1 is pivotal in reactive oxygen species (ROS) release during oxidative stress by ischemia-reperfusion injury, specifically in the myocardium as part of a heart attack (also known as ischemic heart disease). Ischemic heart disease, which results from an occlusion of one of the major coronary arteries, is currently still the leading cause of morbidity and mortality in western society. During ischemia reperfusion, ROS release substantially contribute to the cell damage and death via a direct effect on the cell as well as via apoptotic signals. SOD1 is known to have a capacity to limit the detrimental effects of ROS. As such, SOD1 is important for its cardioprotective effects. In addition, SOD1 has been implicated in cardioprotection against ischemia-reperfusion injury, such as during ischemic preconditioning of the heart. Although a large burst of ROS is known to lead to cell damage, a moderate release of ROS from the mitochondria, which occurs during nonlethal short episodes of ischemia, can play a significant triggering role in the signal transduction pathways of ischemic preconditioning leading to reduction of cell damage. It even has been observed that during this release of ROS, SOD1 plays an important role hereby regulating apoptotic signaling and cell death.

In one study, deletions in the gene were reported in two familial cases of keratoconus. Mice lacking SOD1 have increased age-related muscle mass loss (sarcopenia), early development of cataracts, macular degeneration, thymic involution, hepatocellular carcinoma, and shortened lifespan. Research suggests that increased SOD1 levels could be a biomarker for chronic heavy metal toxicity in women with long-term dental amalgam fillings.

=== Amyotrophic lateral sclerosis (Lou Gehrig's disease) ===
Mutations (over 150 identified to date) in this gene have been linked to familial amyotrophic lateral sclerosis. However, several pieces of evidence also show that wild-type SOD1, under conditions of cellular stress, is implicated in a significant fraction of sporadic ALS cases, which represent 90% of ALS patients. The most frequent mutations are A4V (in the U.S.A.) and H46R (Japan). In Iceland only SOD1-G93S has been found. The most studied ALS mouse model is G93A. Rare transcript variants have been reported for this gene.

Virtually all known ALS-causing SOD1 mutations act in a dominant fashion; a single mutant copy of the SOD1 gene is sufficient to cause the disease. The exact molecular mechanism (or mechanisms) by which SOD1 mutations cause disease are unknown. It appears to be some sort of toxic gain of function, as many disease-associated SOD1 mutants (including G93A and A4V) retain enzymatic activity and Sod1 knockout mice do not develop ALS (although they do exhibit a strong age-dependent distal motor neuropathy).

ALS is a neurodegenerative disease characterized by selective loss of motor neurons causing muscle atrophy. The DNA oxidation product 8-OHdG is a well-established marker of oxidative DNA damage. 8-OHdG accumulates in the mitochondria of spinal motor neurons of persons with ALS. In transgenic ALS mice harboring a mutant SOD1 gene, 8-OHdG also accumulates in mitochondrial DNA of spinal motor neurons. These findings suggest that oxidative damage to mitochondrial DNA of motor neurons due to altered SOD1 may be significant factor in the etiology of ALS.

==== A4V mutation ====
A4V (alanine at codon 4 changed to valine) is the most common ALS-causing mutation in the U.S. population, with approximately 50% of SOD1-ALS patients carrying the A4V mutation. Approximately 10% of all U.S. familial ALS cases are caused by heterozygous A4V mutations in SOD1. The mutation is rarely if ever found outside the Americas.

It was recently estimated that the A4V mutation occurred 540 generations (~12,000 years) ago. The haplotype surrounding the mutation suggests that the A4V mutation arose in the Asian ancestors of Native Americans, who reached the Americas through the Bering Strait.

The A4V mutant belongs to the WT-like mutants. Patients with A4V mutations exhibit variable age of onset, but uniformly very rapid disease course, with average survival after onset of 1.4 years (versus 3–5 years with other dominant SOD1 mutations, and in some cases such as H46R, considerably longer). This survival is considerably shorter than non-mutant SOD1 linked ALS.

==== H46R mutation ====
H46R (histidine at codon 46 changed to arginine) is the most common ALS-causing mutation in the Japanese population, with about 40% of Japanese SOD1-ALS patients carrying this mutation. H46R causes a profound loss of copper binding in the active site of SOD1, and as such, H46R is enzymatically inactive. The disease course of this mutation is extremely long, with the typical time from onset to death being over 15 years. Mouse models with this mutation do not exhibit the classical mitochondrial vacuolation pathology seen in G93A and G37R ALS mice and unlike G93A mice, deficiency of the major mitochondrial antioxidant enzyme, SOD2, has no effect on their disease course.

==== G93A mutation ====
G93A (glycine 93 changed to alanine) is a comparatively rare mutation, but has been studied very intensely as it was the first mutation to be modeled in mice. G93A is a pseudo-WT mutation that leaves the enzyme activity intact. Because of the ready availability of the G93A mouse from Jackson Laboratory, many studies of potential drug targets and toxicity mechanisms have been carried out in this model. At least one private research institute (ALS Therapy Development Institute) is conducting large-scale drug screens exclusively in this mouse model. Whether findings are specific for G93A or applicable to all ALS-causing SOD1 mutations is at present unknown. It has been argued that certain pathological features of the G93A mouse are due to overexpression artifacts, specifically those relating to mitochondrial vacuolation (the G93A mouse commonly used from Jackson Lab has over 20 copies of the human SOD1 gene). At least one study has found that certain features of pathology are idiosyncratic to G93A and not extrapolatable to all ALS-causing mutations. Further studies have shown that the pathogenesis of the G93A and H46R models are clearly distinct; some drugs and genetic interventions that are highly beneficial/detrimental in one model have either the opposite or no effect in the other.

=== Down syndrome ===
Down syndrome (DS) is usually caused by a triplication of chromosome 21. Oxidative stress is thought to be an important underlying factor in DS-related pathologies. The oxidative stress appears to be due to the triplication and increased expression of the SOD1 gene located in chromosome 21. Increased expression of SOD1 likely causes increased production of hydrogen peroxide leading to increased cellular injury.

The levels of 8-OHdG in the DNA of persons with DS, measured in saliva, were found to be significantly higher than in control groups. 8-OHdG levels were also increased in the leukocytes of persons with DS compared to controls. These findings suggest that oxidative DNA damage may lead to some of the clinical features of DS.

== Interactions ==
SOD1 has been shown to interact with CCS and Bcl-2.
