= SOD3 =

Protein-coding gene in the species Homo sapiens

Identifiers
- Aliases: SOD3, EC-SOD, superoxide dismutase 3, extracellular, superoxide dismutase 3
- External IDs: OMIM: 185490; MGI: 103181; GeneCards: SOD3
Available structures
PDB	Ortholog search: PDBe RCSB
PDB	List of PDB id codes 2JLP
Enzyme activity
EC #	BRENDA	ExPASy	KEGG	MetaCyc
1.15.1.1	↗	↗	↗	↗

Gene location (Human)
Chr.	Chromosome 4 (human)
Band	4p15.2	Start	24,789,912 bp
Band	4p15.2	End	24,800,842 bp

Gene location (Mouse)
Chr.	Chromosome 5 (mouse)
Band	5 C1|5 27.92 cM	Start	52,521,133 bp
Band	5 C1|5 27.92 cM	End	52,528,760 bp
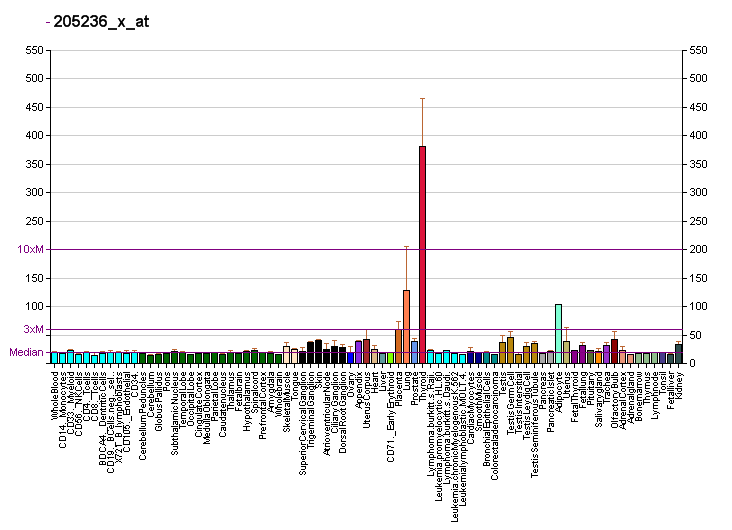
RNA expression pattern
Bgee	Human / Mouse (ortholog); Top expressed in: Descending thoracic aorta; right uterine tube; ascending aorta; right coronary artery; popliteal artery; tibial arteries; left coronary artery; gastric mucosa; canal of the cervix; right lung / Top expressed in: choroid plexus of fourth ventricle; ascending aorta; right kidney; aortic valve; lactiferous gland; human kidney; right lung; brown adipose tissue; adrenal gland; ankle; More reference expression data
BioGPS	More reference expression data
Gene ontology
Molecular function	heparin binding; zinc ion binding; metal ion binding; antioxidant activity; protein binding; oxidoreductase activity; copper ion binding; superoxide dismutase activity; superoxide dismutase copper chaperone activity
Cellular component	cytoplasm; extracellular matrix; Golgi lumen; extracellular exosome; nucleus; extracellular space; extracellular region; collagen-containing extracellular matrix
Biological process	response to hypoxia; response to copper ion; response to oxidative stress; superoxide metabolic process; cellular response to oxidative stress; removal of superoxide radicals; cellular oxidant detoxification; positive regulation of catalytic activity
Sources:Amigo / QuickGO
Orthologs
Databases	NCBI: entry; OMA: entry
Species	Human	Mouse
Entrez	6649	20657
Ensembl	ENSG00000109610	ENSMUSG00000072941
UniProt	P08294	O09164
RefSeq (mRNA)	NM_003102	NM_011435
RefSeq (protein)	NP_003093	NP_035565
Location (UCSC)	Chr 4: 24.79 – 24.8 Mb	Chr 5: 52.52 – 52.53 Mb
PubMed search
- Wikidata
View/Edit Human	View/Edit Mouse

Extracellular superoxide dismutase [Cu-Zn] is an enzyme that in humans is encoded by the SOD3 gene.

This gene encodes a member of the superoxide dismutase (SOD) protein family. SODs are antioxidant enzymes that catalyze the dismutation of two superoxide radicals into hydrogen peroxide and oxygen. The product of this gene is thought to protect the brain, lungs, and other tissues from oxidative stress. The protein is secreted into the extracellular space and forms a glycosylated homotetramer that is anchored to the extracellular matrix (ECM) and cell surfaces through an interaction with heparan sulfate proteoglycan and collagen. A fraction of the protein is cleaved near the C-terminus before secretion to generate circulating tetramers that do not interact with the ECM.

Among black garden ants (Lasius niger), the lifespan of queens is an order of magnitude greater than that of workers despite no systematic nucleotide sequence difference between them. The SOD3 gene was found to be the most differentially over-expressed gene in the brains of queen vs worker ants. This finding raises the possibility that SOD3 antioxidant activity plays a key role in the striking longevity of social insect queens.
