= Irwin Fridovich =

American biochemist (1929-2019)

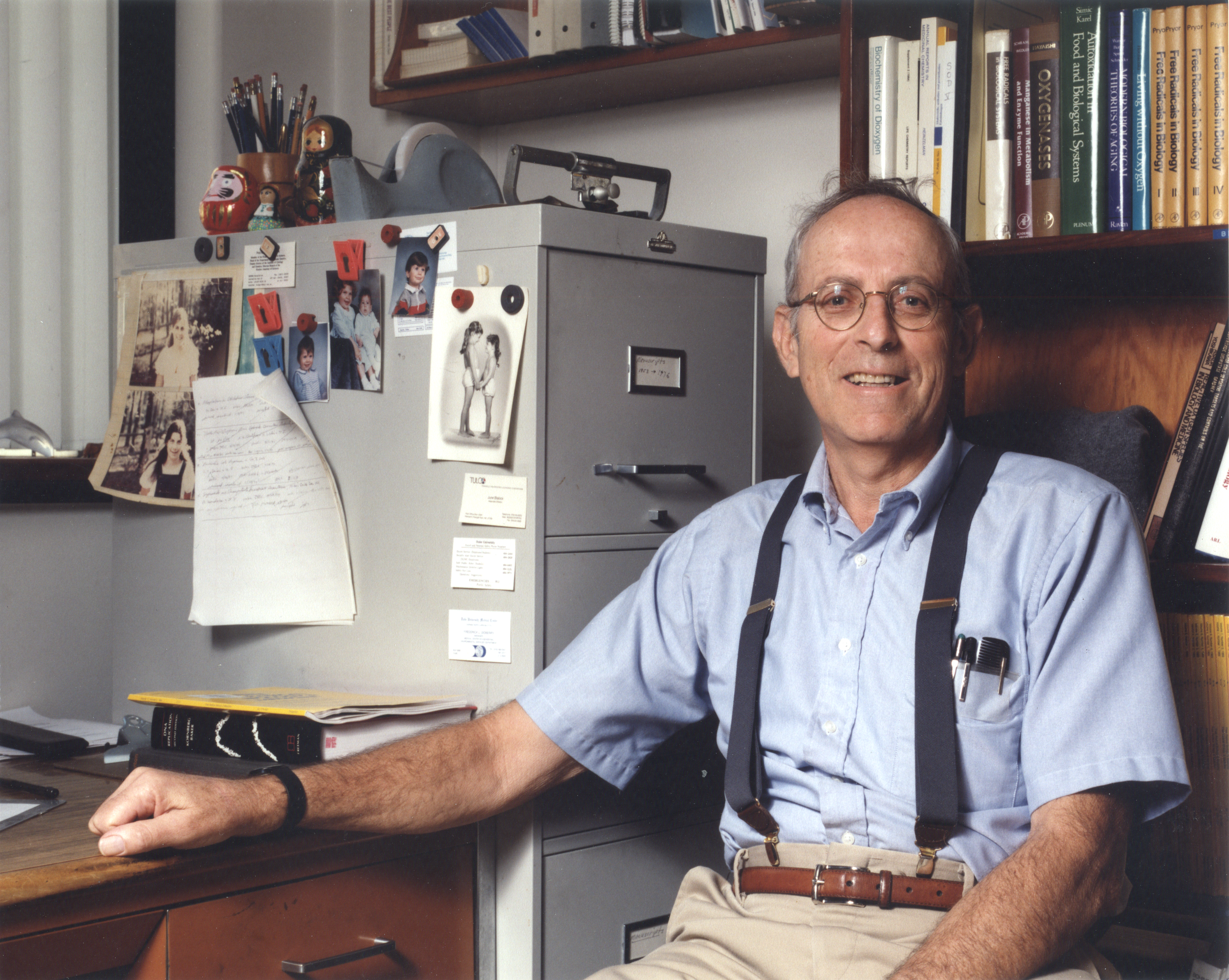
- Born: August 2, 1929; New York City, New York, U.S.
- Died: November 2, 2019 (aged 90)
- Education: City College of New York (BS 1951), Duke University (PhD 1955)
- Known for: Superoxide dismutase, oxygen free radicals
- Awards: Elliott Cresson Medal (1997)
- Scientific career
- Fields: Biochemistry
- Workplaces: Cornell Medical College, Duke University
- Doctoral advisor: Philip Handler
- Doctoral students: Joe M. McCord, Hara P. Misra

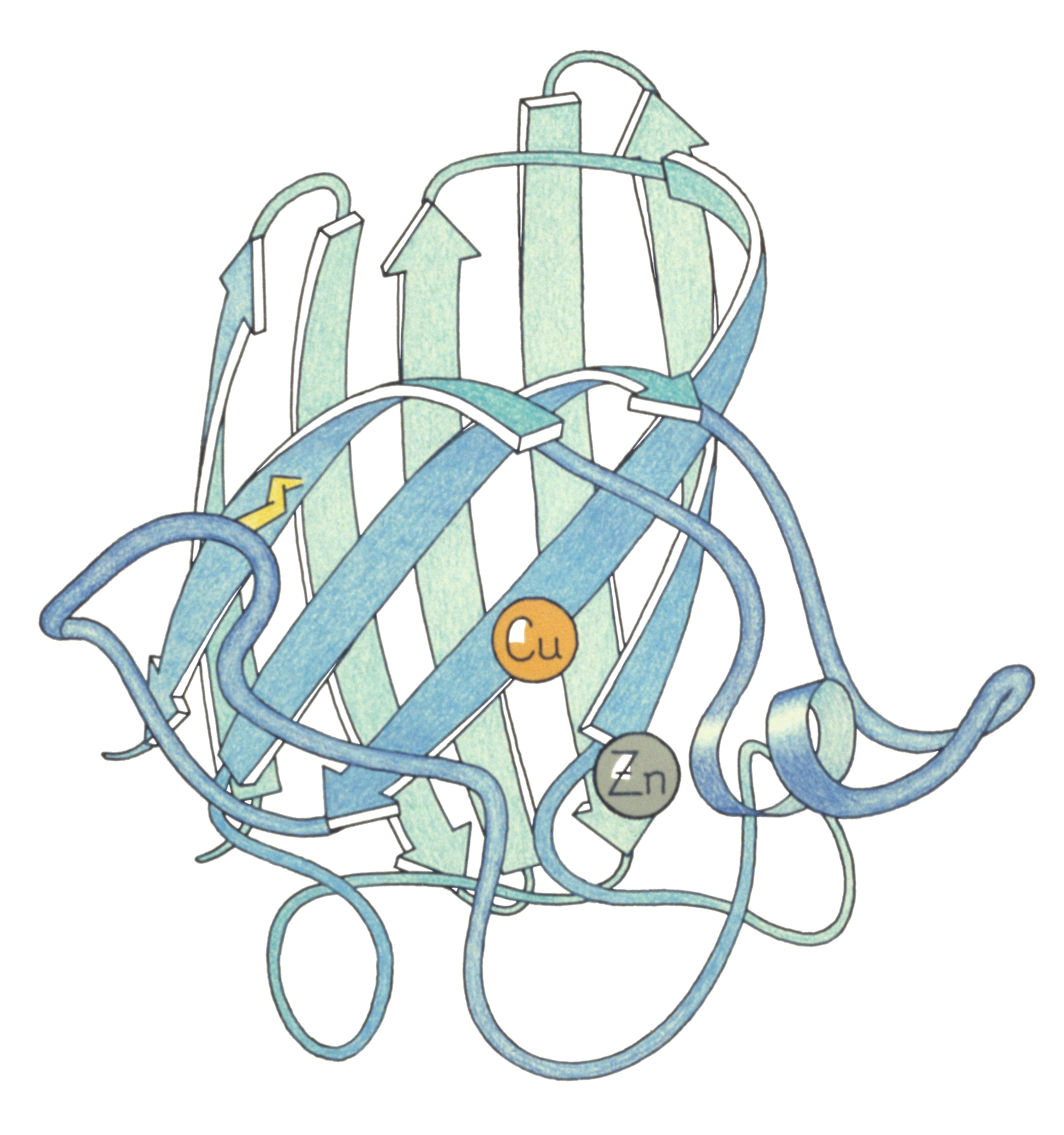
Ribbon drawing of the subunit 3D structure of Cu,Zn superoxide dismutase

Irwin Fridovich (August 2, 1929 – November 2, 2019) was an American biochemist who, together with his graduate student Joe M. McCord, discovered the enzymatic activity of copper-zinc superoxide dismutase (SOD),—to protect organisms from the toxic effects of superoxide free radicals formed as a byproduct of normal oxygen metabolism. Subsequently, Fridovich's research group also discovered the manganese-containing and the iron-containing SODs from Escherichia coli and the mitochondrial MnSOD (SOD2), now known to be an essential protein in mammals. He spent the rest of his career studying the biochemical mechanisms of SOD and of biological superoxide toxicity, using bacteria as model systems. Fridovich was also Professor Emeritus of Biochemistry at Duke University.

== Academic career ==
From 1951 to 1952, Fridovich served as a medical research associate at Cornell Medical College. He held junior teaching positions in biochemistry at Duke University 1956 to 1961 and was a visiting research associate at Harvard University from 1961 to 1962. He became an assistant professor in biochemistry at Duke University in 1961 and a full professor in 1971. He was appointed as James B. Duke Professor of Biochemistry in 1976 and held the position as professor emeritus since 1996 until his death.

== Awards and honors ==
Fridovich received numerous awards and recognitions for his work, including membership in the National Academy of Sciences and the American Academy of Arts and Sciences, and the Elliott Cresson Medal of the Franklin Institute, Philadelphia. According to Google Scholar, he has over 51,000 citations in the scientific literature, including 7 papers with >1000 citations, and an h-index of 97. His discovery of the superoxide dismutase reaction essentially started the field of oxygen free radicals in biology and medicine, and that influence is shown by his election as president of the American Society of Biological Chemists (for 1982–83), the Oxygen Society (1987–1990), and the Society for Free Radical Research (1992–94), as well as award of the Science & Humanity Prize at the 2000 Oxygen Club World Congress.
