= Joe M. McCord =

American biochemist (born 1945)

Joe Milton McCord
- Born: March 3, 1945 (age 81)
- Citizenship: United States
- Education: Rhodes College, Duke University
- Known for: Discovery of superoxide dismutase
- Scientific career
- Fields: Biochemistry
- Workplaces: University of Colorado
- Doctoral advisor: Irwin Fridovich

Joe Milton McCord (born March 3, 1945) is an American biochemist. While serving as a graduate student, he and his supervisor Irwin Fridovich were the first to describe the enzymatic activity of superoxide dismutase. McCord joined the board of directors of the LifeVantage Corporation (makers of the dietary supplement Protandim) in 2006, serving as the company's chief science officer from 2011 to 2012, and retired from the company in June 2013.

== Academic background ==
McCord received a B.S. degree in chemistry from Rhodes College (graduated 1966) and a Ph.D. in biochemistry from Duke University (graduated 1970), where he also conducted postdoctoral research.

McCord is a past recipient of the Discovery Award from the Society for Free Radical Biology and Medicine (shared with Irwin Fridovich), the Elliott Cresson Medal, and a Lifetime Achievement Award from the Oxygen Society.

== LifeVantage/Protandim ==
McCord served on the board of directors (Director of Science) of the LifeVantage Corporation beginning in 2006 and was listed by the SEC as an insider shareholder. LifeVantage is a Utah-based multilevel marketing company that distributes an antioxidant dietary supplement known as Protandim. McCord co-authored 7 studies on the product and participated in distributor training. McCord served as chief scientific officer for LifeVantage from June 2011 until September 2012, and then became a member of the company's science advisory board. LifeVantage announced McCord's retirement in June 2013. Under the terms of the separation agreement, McCord was to receive a payment of $1.7 million from the company.

== Pathways Bio ==
McCord co-founded Pathways Bioscience to improve health span and overcome health and wellness problems associated with aging by supporting the body's own defense mechanisms that allow it to protect and heal itself. Pathways Bioscience is focused on the discovery and development of new agents that regulate gene expression and exert beneficial effects by influencing cell defense pathways.
