= Hara P. Misra =

American biochemist (born 1940)

- Born: 1 January 1940 (age 86); Orissa, India
- Education: Utkal University, Virginia Tech
- Known for: Oxygen metabolism, biochemistry
- Scientific career
- Fields: Biochemistry
- Workplaces: Virginia Tech
- Doctoral advisor: Irwin Fridovich

Hara Prasad Misra (born 1940) is an American biochemist and professor emeritus of biomedical sciences and pathology in the Virginia-Maryland Regional College of Veterinary Medicine at Virginia Tech. Misra is currently serving as vice president for research and graduate studies at the Virginia College of Osteopathic Medicine in Blacksburg, Virginia. Misra is a well-known teacher of undergraduate, graduate and DVM professional students for a period spanning over 30 years.

Misra has served as the principal investigator (PI) on more than $2 million in grants from federal funding agencies while also serving on a number of national and international panels and committees related to his field of expertise in free radical toxicology. He has authored or coauthored more than 130 chapters and scientific articles in peer reviewed publications and has given over 200 presentations and seminars at national and international scientific meetings. According to Google Scholar, he has over 8700 citations in the scientific literature, including 1 paper with >3000 citations, and an H-index of 44.

== Current research ==
Aging and Neurodegenerative diseases (Alzheimer Disease and Parkinson's Disease): Role of environmental pollutants, molecular mechanism(s), and dietary regulation.

Initiated free radical research during post doctoral studies and has continued research interest in the areas of free radicals and oxidative stress in biology and medicine. His lab is active in studying the health effects associated with free radicals of oxygen, oxidative stress and role of antioxidants in patho-physiological processes. Recently, he has shown that mixtures of pesticides potentiate the immunotoxicity in C57Bl/6 mice and free radicals of oxygen are involved in this process. In addition, his lab is active in studying the mechanism of action of pesticides and MPTP in developing Alzheimer's and Parkinson's Diseases.

== Education ==
- Utkal University (1962) BVSc. (DVM equivalency)
- Virginia Polytechnic Institute & State University (1968) M.S.
- Virginia Tech (1970) Ph.D.

The Academic Genealogy of Dr. Hara P. Misra

== Positions ==
- Duke University Medical Center - Post doc
- University of Alabama in Birmingham - Research Associate
- University of California at Davis – Assistant Professor of Physiological Sciences
- Oklahoma Medical Research Foundation - Assistant Professor
- Virginia-Maryland Regional College of Veterinary Medicine (Virginia Tech) - Associate Professor of Biomedical Sciences (1985–1989)
- Virginia-Maryland Regional College of Veterinary Medicine (Virginia Tech) - Department Head (1987–1992)
- Virginia-Maryland Regional College of Veterinary Medicine (Virginia Tech) - Professor of Biomedical Sciences (1989–2005)
- Virginia College of Osteopathic Medicine - Professor of Biochemistry (2005 – current)

== Awards ==
- Professor Emeritus
- Diplomate, American College of Forensic Examiners Institute (ACFEI)

== Editorial boards and panels ==
- FASEB
- National Cancer Institute
- National Institutes of Health
- American Institute for Cancer Research

== Honors ==
- Society of Toxicology
- American Society of Biological Chemists
- Association of Scientists of Indian Origin in America

== Field Impact ==
Misra has published 120 research articles between the years of 1971–2009 which have collectively been cited over 3625 times.

== Selected bibliography ==
- Kukucka, M; Misra, H (1994). "Elevated concentrations of ascorbate and normoxia suppress testosterone production in cultured guinea pig leydig cells". Reproductive Toxicology. 8 (4): 333–9. Bibcode:1994RepTx...8..333K. doi:10.1016/0890-6238(94)90049-3. PMID 7949759.
- Kukucka, Mark A.; Misra, Hara P. (1993). "The antioxidant defense system of isolated guinea pig Leydig cells". Molecular and Cellular Biochemistry. 126 (1): 1–7. doi:10.1007/BF01772202. PMID 8107685. S2CID 2309386.
- Misra, BR; Misra, HP (1990). "Vasoactive intestinal peptide, a singlet oxygen quencher". The Journal of Biological Chemistry. 265 (26): 15371–4. doi:10.1016/S0021-9258(18)55404-1. PMID 2168410.
- Misra, HP (1974). "Generation of superoxide free radical during the autoxidation of thiols". The Journal of Biological Chemistry. 249 (7): 2151–5. doi:10.1016/S0021-9258(19)42810-X. PMID 4206550.
- Misra, HP; Fridovich, I (1972). "The generation of superoxide radical during the autoxidation of hemoglobin". The Journal of Biological Chemistry. 247 (21): 6960–2. doi:10.1016/S0021-9258(19)44679-6. PMID 4673289.
- Misra, HP; Fridovich, I (1972). "The role of superoxide anion in the autoxidation of epinephrine and a simple assay for superoxide dismutase". The Journal of Biological Chemistry. 247 (10): 3170–5. doi:10.1016/S0021-9258(19)45228-9. PMID 4623845.
