= Superoxide dismutase =

Class of enzymes

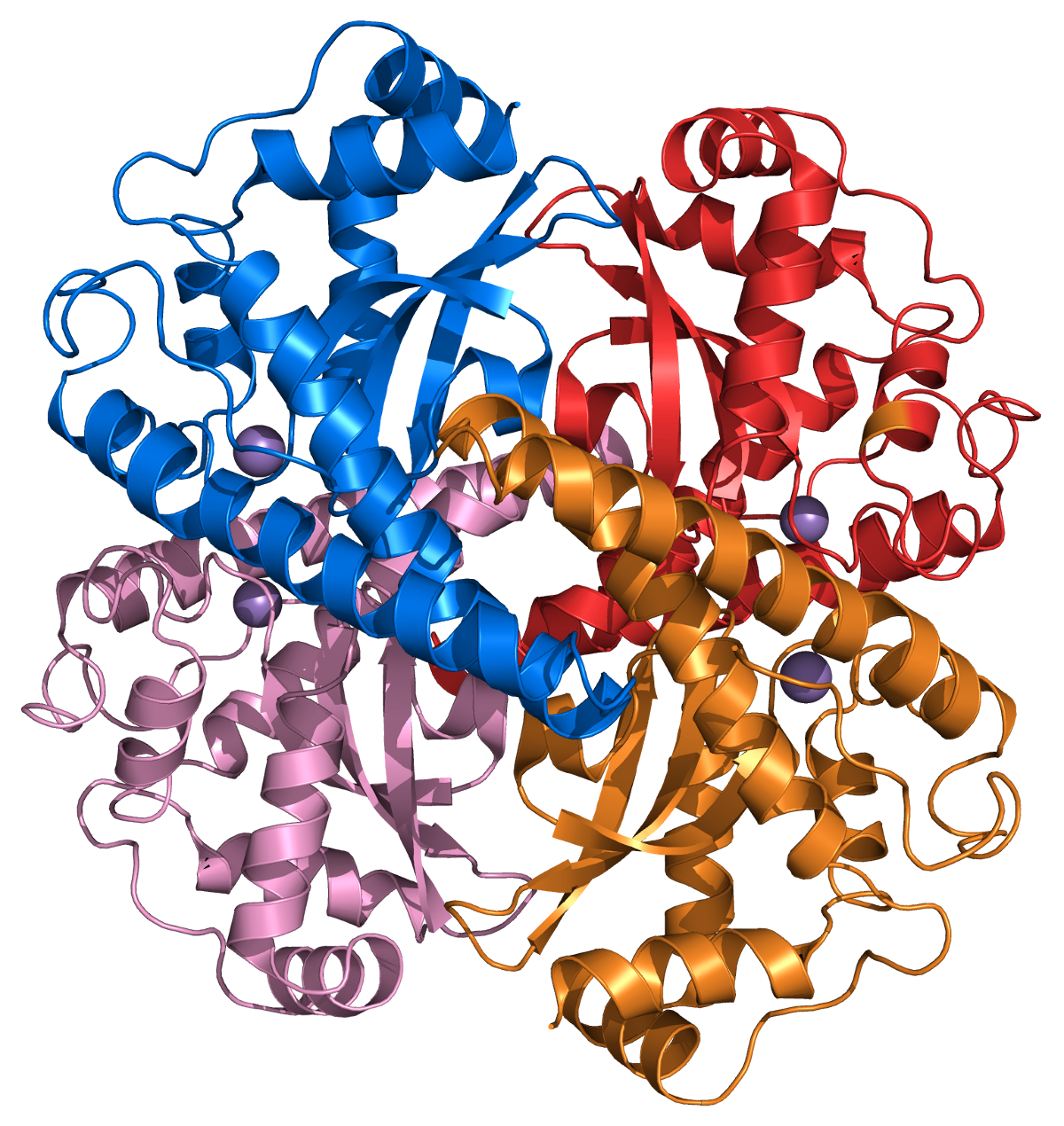
- Structure of a human Mn superoxide dismutase 2 tetramer

Identifiers
- EC no.: 1.15.1.1
- CAS no.: 9054-89-1

Databases
- BRENDA: enzyme data
- ExPASy: NiceZyme view
- KEGG: enzyme entry
- MetaCyc: metabolic pathway
- Rhea: reactions
- PDB structures: RCSB PDB PDBe PDBsum
- Gene Ontology: AmiGO / QuickGO
Search
- PMC: articles
- PubMed: articles
- NCBI: proteins

Superoxide dismutase (SOD, EC 1.15.1.1) is any of a family of enzymes that alternately catalyze the dismutation (or partitioning) of the superoxide (O^{−}_{2}) anion radical into normal molecular oxygen (O_{2}) and hydrogen peroxide (H_{2}O_{2}). Superoxide is produced as a by-product of oxygen metabolism and, if not regulated, causes many types of cell damage. Hydrogen peroxide is also damaging and is degraded by other enzymes such as catalase. Thus, SOD is an important antioxidant defense in nearly all living cells exposed to oxygen. One exception is Lactobacillus plantarum and related lactobacilli, which use intracellular manganese to prevent damage from reactive O^{−}_{2}.

== Chemical reaction ==
SODs catalyze the disproportionation of superoxide:

2H^{+} + 2O^{−}_{2} → O_{2} + H_{2}O_{2}

In this way, O^{−}_{2} is converted into two less damaging species.

The general form, applicable to all the different metal−coordinated forms of SOD, can be written as follows:

- M_{(n+1)+}−SOD + O^{−}_{2} → M_{n+}−SOD + O_{2}
- M_{n+}−SOD + O^{−}_{2} + 2H^{+} → M_{(n+1)+}−SOD + H_{2}O_{2}

The reactions by which SOD−catalyzed dismutation of superoxide for Cu,Zn SOD can be written as follows:

- Cu^{2+}−SOD + O^{−}_{2} → Cu^{+}−SOD + O_{2} (reduction of copper; oxidation of superoxide)
- Cu^{+}−SOD + O^{−}_{2} + 2H^{+} → Cu^{2+}−SOD + H_{2}O_{2} (oxidation of copper; reduction of superoxide)

where M = Cu (n=1); Mn (n=2); Fe (n=2); Ni (n=2) only in prokaryotes.

In a series of such reactions, the oxidation state and the charge of the metal cation oscillates between n and n+1: +1 and +2 for Cu, or +2 and +3 for the other metals.

== Types ==
=== General ===
Irwin Fridovich and Joe McCord at Duke University discovered the enzymatic activity of superoxide dismutase in 1968. SODs were previously known as a group of metalloproteins with unknown function; for example, CuZnSOD was known as erythrocuprein (or hemocuprein, or cytocuprein) or as the veterinary anti-inflammatory drug "Orgotein". Likewise, Brewer (1967) identified a protein that later became known as superoxide dismutase as an indophenol oxidase by protein analysis of starch gels using the phenazine-tetrazolium technique.

There are three major families of superoxide dismutase, depending on the protein fold and the metal cofactor: the Cu/Zn type (which binds both copper and zinc), Fe and Mn types (which bind either iron or manganese), and the Ni type (which binds nickel).

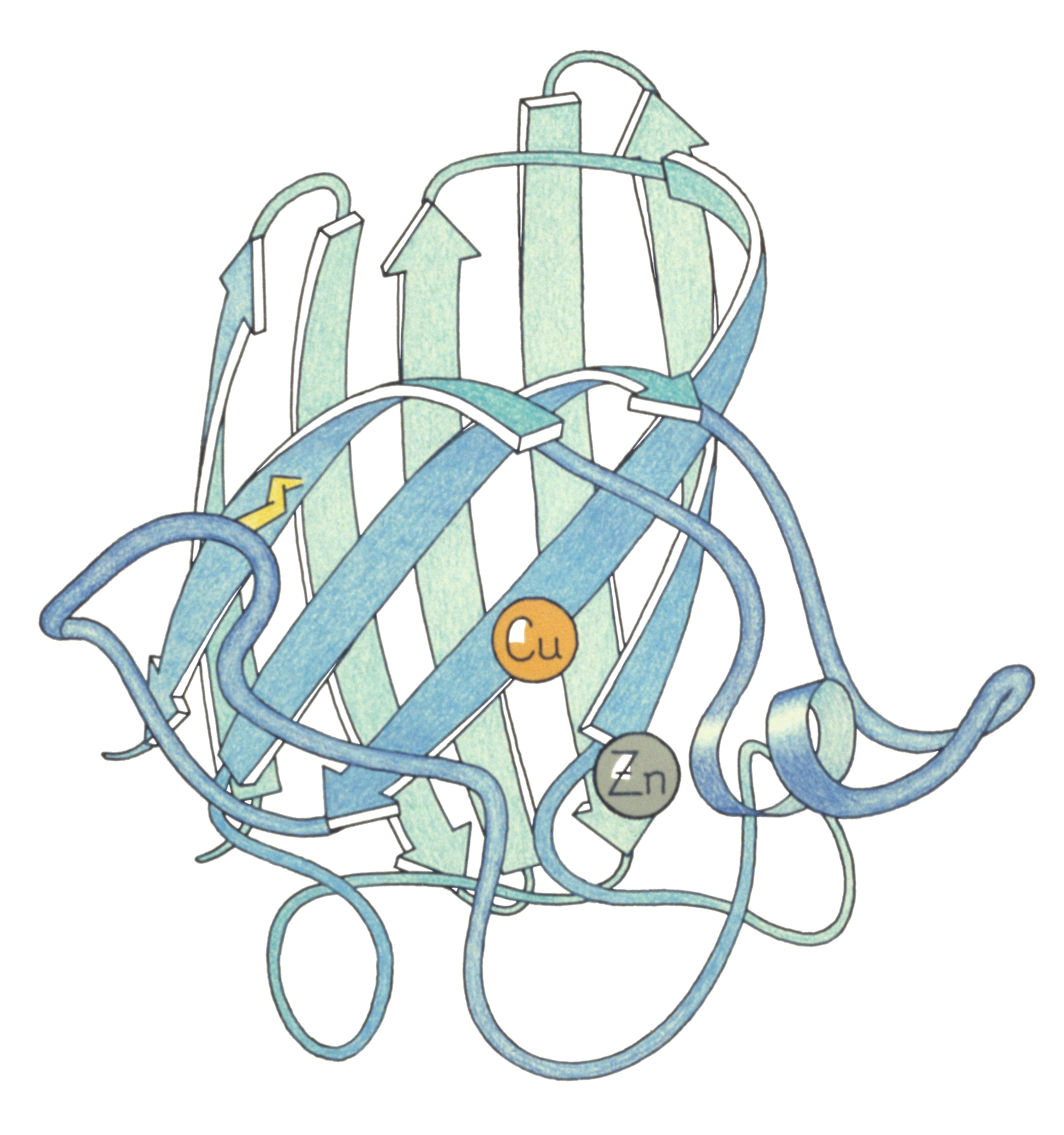
Ribbon diagram of bovine Cu-Zn SOD subunit

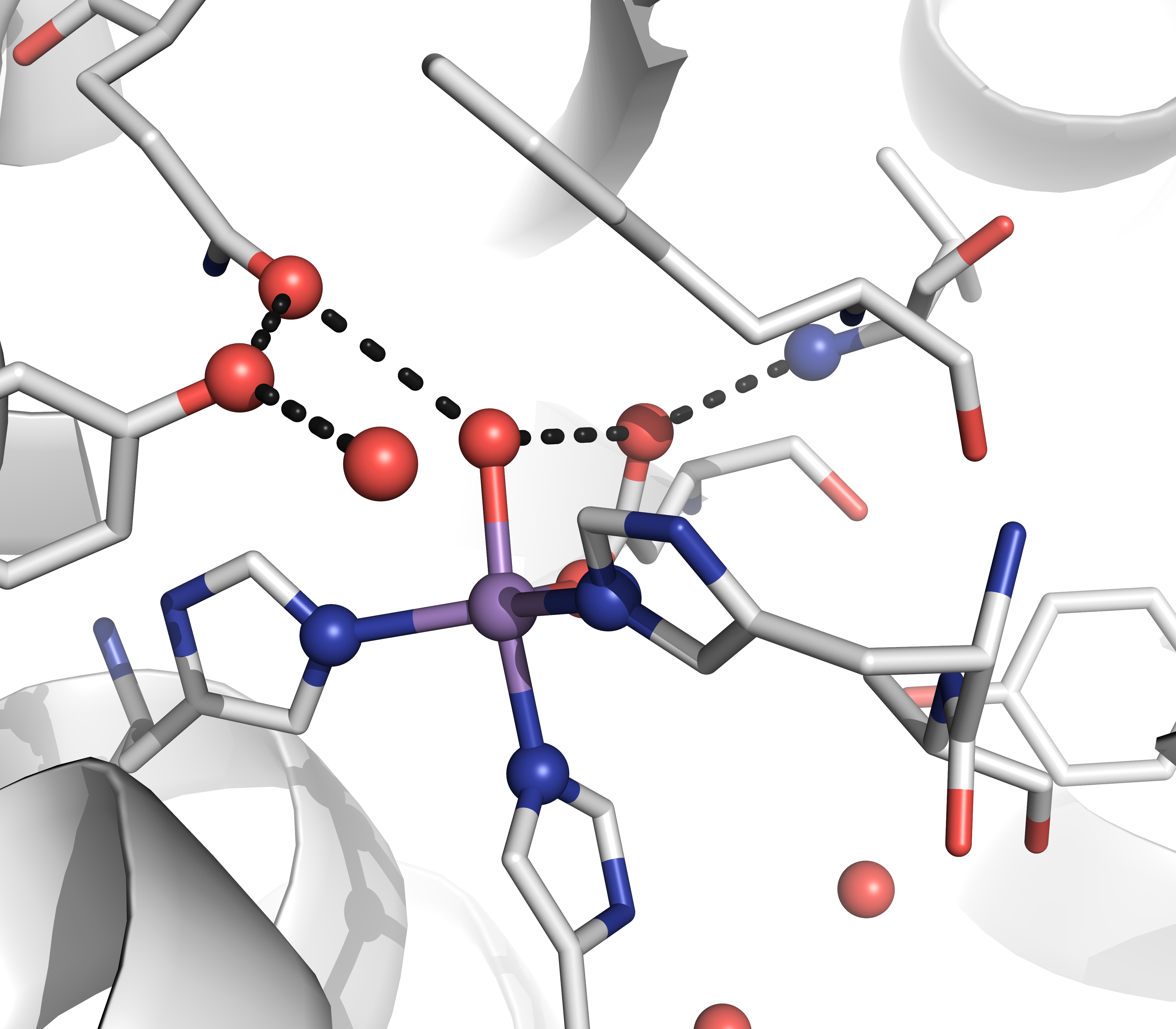
Active site of Human Manganese SOD, manganese shown in purple

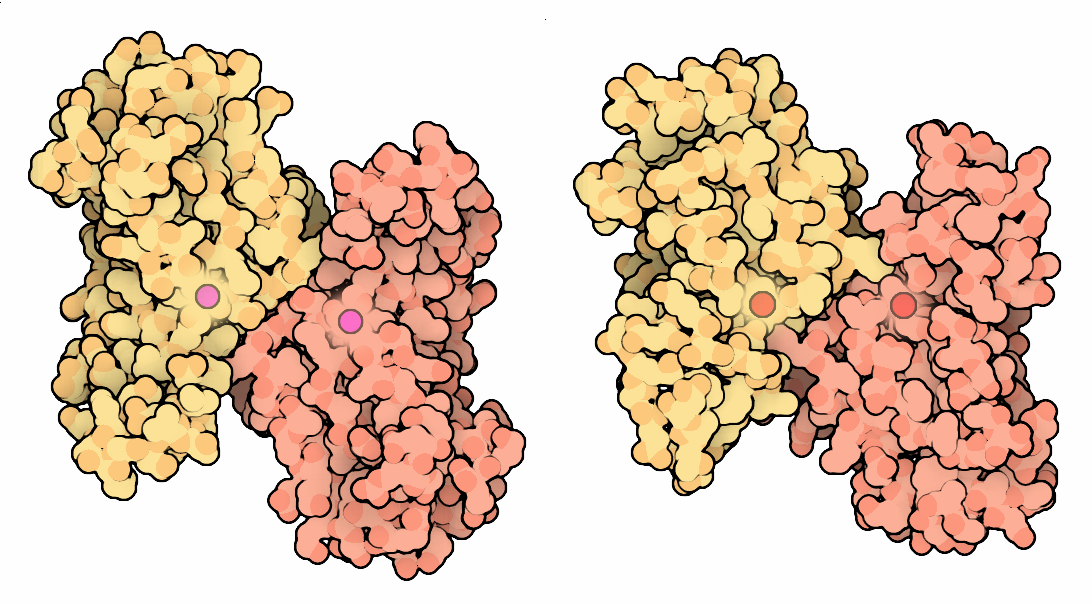
Mn-SOD vs Fe-SOD dimers

- Copper and zinc – most commonly used by eukaryotes, including humans. The cytosols of virtually all eukaryotic cells contain a SOD enzyme with copper and zinc (Cu-Zn-SOD). For example, Cu-Zn-SOD available commercially is normally purified from bovine red blood cells. The bovine Cu-Zn enzyme is a homodimer of molecular weight 32,500. It was the first SOD whose atomic-detail crystal structure was solved, in 1975. It is an 8-stranded "Greek key" beta-barrel, with the active site held between the barrel and two surface loops. The two subunits are tightly joined back-to-back, mostly by hydrophobic and some electrostatic interactions. The ligands of the copper and zinc are six histidine and one aspartate side-chains; one histidine is bound between the two metals.
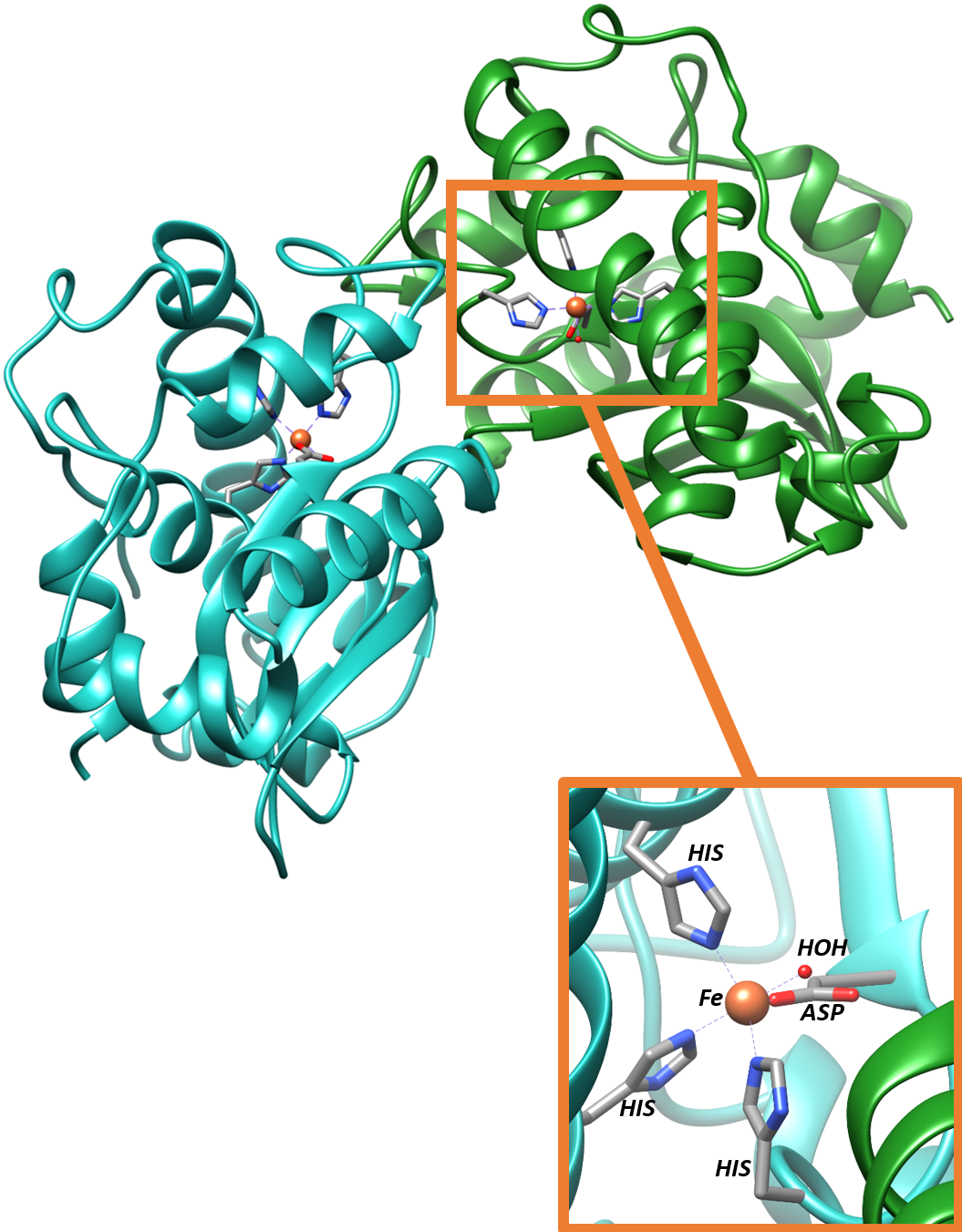
- Active site for iron superoxide dismutase
  Iron or manganese – used by prokaryotes and protists, and in mitochondria and chloroplasts
  - Iron – Many bacteria contain a form of the enzyme with iron (Fe-SOD); some bacteria contain Fe-SOD, others Mn-SOD, and some (such as E. coli) contain both. Fe-SOD can also be found in the chloroplasts of plants. The 3D structures of the homologous Mn and Fe superoxide dismutases have the same arrangement of alpha-helices, and their active sites contain the same type and arrangement of amino acid side-chains. They are usually dimers, but occasionally tetramers.
  - Manganese – Nearly all mitochondria, and many bacteria, contain a form with manganese (Mn-SOD): For example, the Mn-SOD found in human mitochondria. The ligands of the manganese ions are 3 histidine side-chains, an aspartate side-chain and a water molecule or hydroxy ligand, depending on the Mn oxidation state (respectively II and III).
- Nickel – prokaryotic. This has a hexameric (6-copy) structure built from right-handed 4-helix bundles, each containing N-terminal hooks that chelate a Ni ion. The Ni-hook contains the motif His-Cys-X-X-Pro-Cys-Gly-X-Tyr; it provides most of the interactions critical for metal binding and catalysis and is, therefore, a likely diagnostic of NiSODs.

Copper/zinc superoxide dismutase
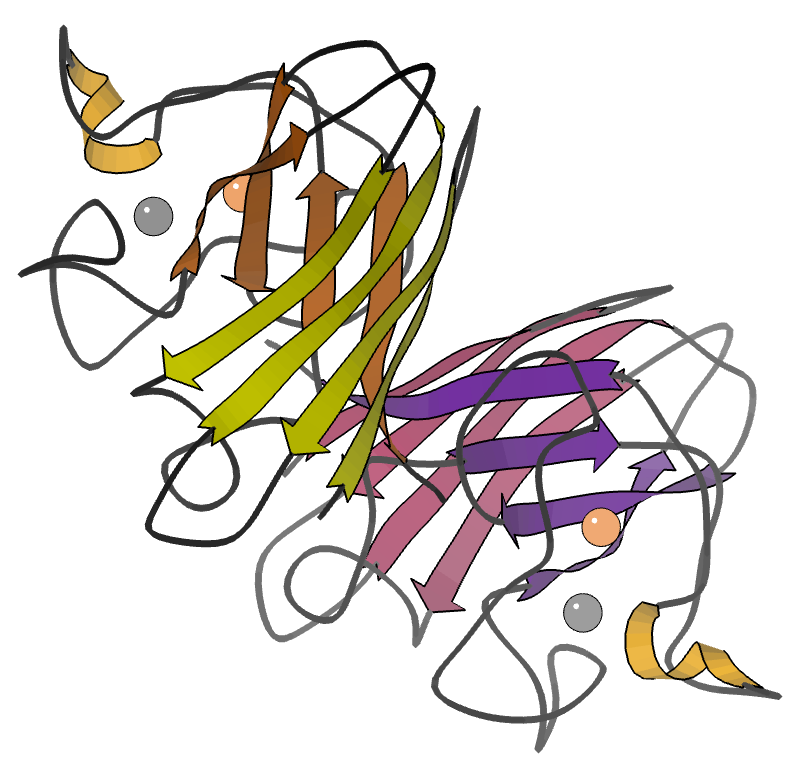
- Yeast Cu,Zn superoxide dismutase dimer

Identifiers
- Symbol: Sod_Cu
- Pfam: PF00080
- InterPro: IPR001424
- PROSITE: PDOC00082
- SCOP2: 1sdy / SCOPe / SUPFAM
Available protein structures:
- PDB: IPR001424 PF00080 (ECOD; PDBsum)
- AlphaFold: IPR001424; PF00080

Iron/manganese superoxide dismutases, alpha-hairpin domain
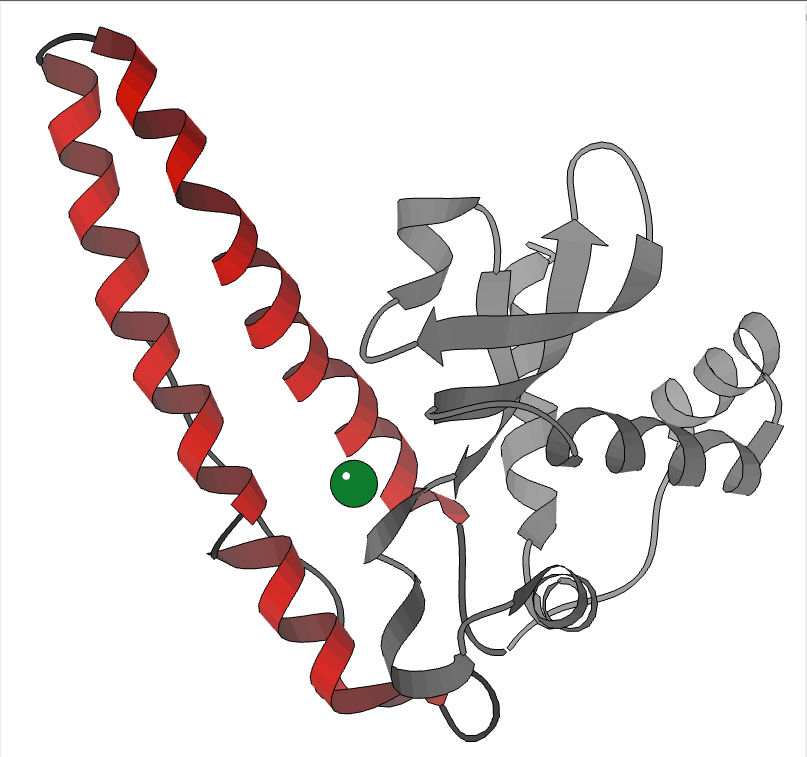
- Structure of domain1 (color), human mitochondrial Mn superoxide dismutase

Identifiers
- Symbol: Sod_Fe_N
- Pfam: PF00081
- InterPro: IPR001189
- PROSITE: PDOC00083
- SCOP2: 1n0j / SCOPe / SUPFAM
Available protein structures:
- PDB: IPR001189 PF00081 (ECOD; PDBsum)
- AlphaFold: IPR001189; PF00081

Iron/manganese superoxide dismutases, C-terminal domain
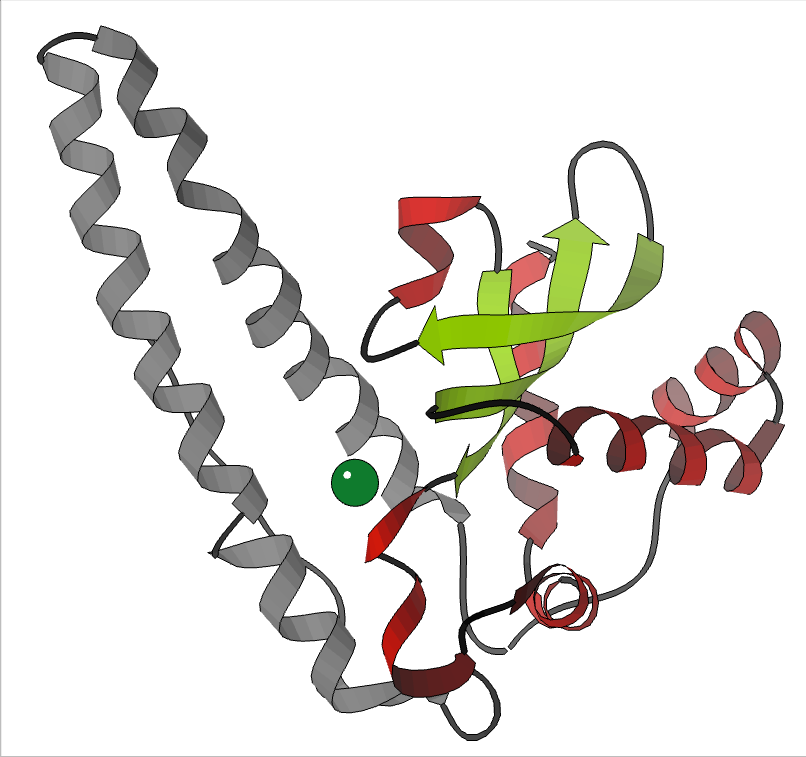
- Structure of domain2 (color), human mitochondrial Mn superoxide dismutase

Identifiers
- Symbol: Sod_Fe_C
- Pfam: PF02777
- InterPro: IPR001189
- PROSITE: PDOC00083
- SCOP2: 1n0j / SCOPe / SUPFAM
Available protein structures:
- PDB: IPR001189 PF02777 (ECOD; PDBsum)
- AlphaFold: IPR001189; PF02777

Nickel superoxide dismutase
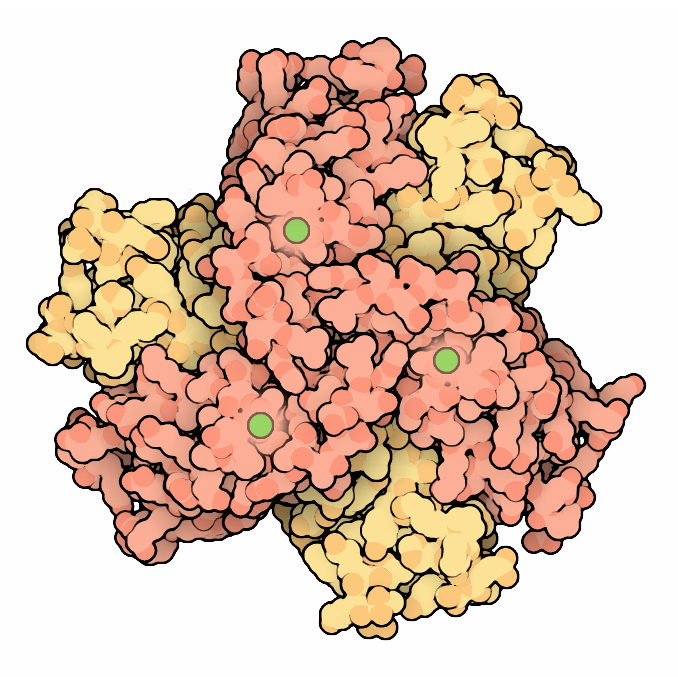
- Structure of Streptomyces Ni superoxide dismutase hexamer

Identifiers
- Symbol: Sod_Ni
- Pfam: PF09055
- InterPro: IPR014123
- SCOP2: 1q0d / SCOPe / SUPFAM
Available protein structures:
- PDB: IPR014123 PF09055 (ECOD; PDBsum)
- AlphaFold: IPR014123; PF09055

In higher plants, SOD isozymes have been localized in different cell compartments. Mn-SOD is present in mitochondria and peroxisomes. Fe-SOD has been found mainly in chloroplasts but has also been detected in peroxisomes, and CuZn-SOD has been localized in cytosol, chloroplasts, peroxisomes, and apoplast.

=== Human ===
There are three forms of superoxide dismutase present in humans, in all other mammals, and most chordates. SOD1 is located in the cytoplasm, SOD2 in the mitochondria, and SOD3 is extracellular. The first is a dimer (consists of two units), whereas the others are tetramers (four subunits). SOD1 and SOD3 contain copper and zinc, whereas SOD2, the mitochondrial enzyme, has manganese in its reactive centre. The genes are located on chromosomes 21, 6, and 4, respectively (21q22.1, 6q25.3 and 4p15.3-p15.1).

SOD1, soluble
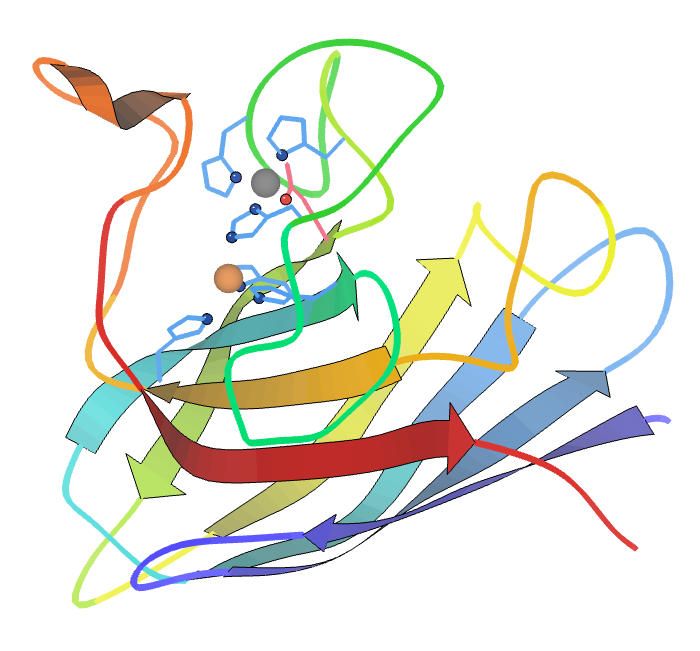
- Crystal structure of the human SOD1 enzyme (rainbow-color N-terminus = blue, C-terminus = red) complexed with copper (orange sphere) and zinc (grey sphere)

Identifiers
- Symbol: SOD1
- Alt. symbols: ALS, ALS1
- NCBI gene: 6647
- HGNC: 11179
- OMIM: 147450
- RefSeq: NM_000454
- UniProt: P00441

Other data
- EC number: 1.15.1.1
- Locus: Chr. 21 q22.1
Search for
- Structures: Swiss-model
- Domains: InterPro

SOD2, mitochondrial
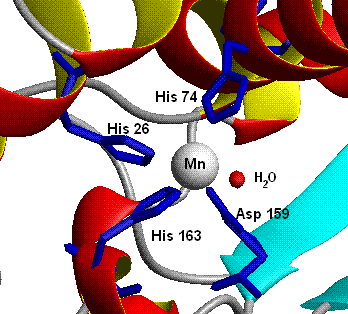
- Active site of human mitochondrial Mn superoxide dismutase (SOD2)

Identifiers
- Symbol: SOD2
- Alt. symbols: Mn-SOD; IPO-B; MVCD6
- NCBI gene: 6648
- HGNC: 11180
- OMIM: 147460
- RefSeq: NM_000636
- UniProt: P04179

Other data
- EC number: 1.15.1.1
- Locus: Chr. 6 q25
Search for
- Structures: Swiss-model
- Domains: InterPro

SOD3, extracellular
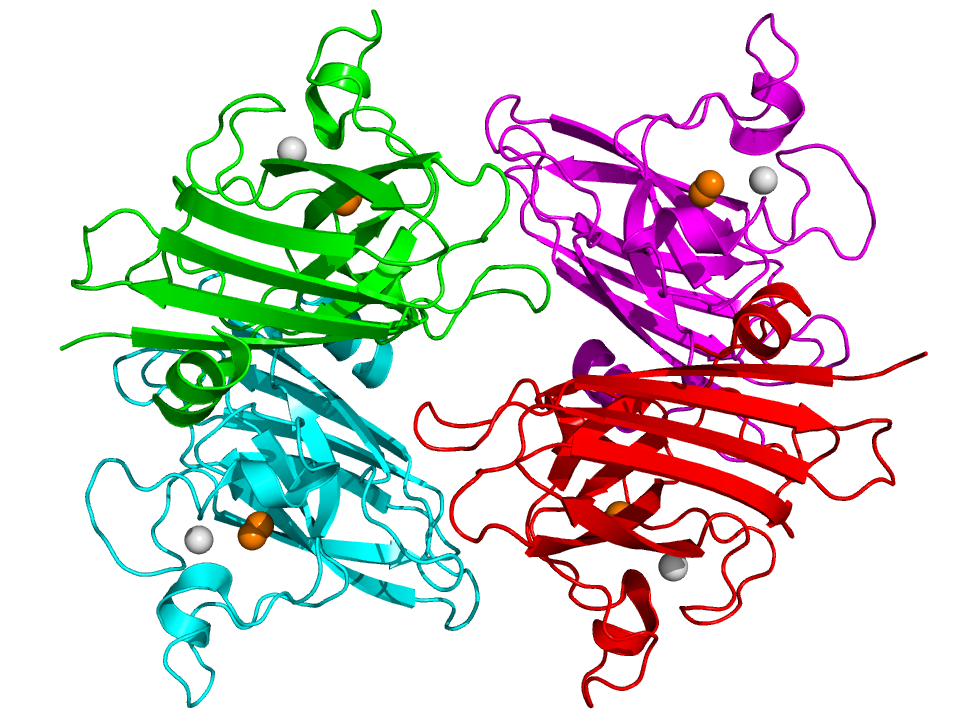
- Crystallographic structure of the tetrameric human SOD3 enzyme (cartoon diagram) complexed with copper and zinc cations (orange and grey spheres respectively)

Identifiers
- Symbol: SOD3
- Alt. symbols: EC-SOD; MGC20077
- NCBI gene: 6649
- HGNC: 11181
- OMIM: 185490
- RefSeq: NM_003102
- UniProt: P08294

Other data
- EC number: 1.15.1.1
- Locus: Chr. 4 pter-q21
Search for
- Structures: Swiss-model
- Domains: InterPro

=== Plants ===
In higher plants, superoxide dismutase enzymes (SODs) act as antioxidants and protect cellular components from being oxidized by reactive oxygen species (ROS). ROS can form as a result of drought, injury, herbicides and pesticides, ozone, plant metabolic activity, nutrient deficiencies, photoinhibition, temperature above and below ground, toxic metals, and UV or gamma rays. To be specific, molecular O_{2} is reduced to O^{−}_{2} (a ROS called superoxide) when it absorbs an excited electron released from compounds of the electron transport chain. Superoxide is known to denature enzymes, oxidize lipids, and fragment DNA. SODs catalyze the production of O_{2} and H_{2}O_{2} from superoxide (O^{−}_{2}), which results in less harmful reactants.

When acclimating to increased levels of oxidative stress, SOD concentrations typically increase with the degree of stress conditions. The compartmentalization of different forms of SOD throughout the plant makes them counteract stress very effectively. There are three well-known and -studied classes of SOD metallic coenzymes that exist in plants. First, Fe SODs consist of two species, one homodimer (containing 1–2 g Fe) and one tetramer (containing 2–4 g Fe). They are thought to be the most ancient SOD metalloenzymes and are found within both prokaryotes and eukaryotes. Fe SODs are most abundantly localized inside plant chloroplasts, where they are indigenous. Second, Mn SODs consist of a homodimer and homotetramer species each containing a single Mn(III) atom per subunit. They are found predominantly in mitochondrion and peroxisomes. Third, Cu-Zn SODs have electrical properties very different from those of the other two classes. These are concentrated in the chloroplast, cytosol, and in some cases the extracellular space. Note that Cu-Zn SODs provide less protection than Fe SODs when localized in the chloroplast.

=== Bacteria ===
Human white blood cells use enzymes such as NADPH oxidase to generate superoxide and other reactive oxygen species to kill bacteria. During infection, some bacteria (e.g., Burkholderia pseudomallei) therefore produce superoxide dismutase to protect themselves from being killed.

== Biochemistry ==
SOD out-competes damaging reactions of superoxide, thus protecting the cell from superoxide toxicity. The reaction of superoxide with non-radicals is spin-forbidden (this does not mean that the reaction cannot happen, but that it will be much slower). In biological systems, this means that its main reactions are with itself (dismutation) or with another biological radical such as nitric oxide (NO) or with a transition-series metal. The superoxide anion radical (O^{−}_{2}) spontaneously dismutes to O_{2} and hydrogen peroxide (H_{2}O_{2}) quite rapidly (~10^{5} M^{−1}s^{−1} at pH 7). SOD is necessary because superoxide reacts with sensitive and critical cellular targets. For example, it reacts with the NO radical, and makes toxic peroxynitrite.

Because the uncatalysed dismutation reaction for superoxide requires two superoxide molecules to react with each other, the dismutation rate is second-order with respect to initial superoxide concentration. Thus, the half-life of superoxide, although very short at high concentrations (e.g., 0.05 seconds at 0.1mM) is actually quite long at low concentrations (e.g., 14 hours at 0.1 nM). In contrast, the reaction of superoxide with SOD is first order with respect to superoxide concentration. Moreover, superoxide dismutase has the largest k_{cat}/K_{M} (an approximation of catalytic efficiency) of any known enzyme (~7 billion M^{−1}s^{−1}), this reaction being limited only by the frequency of collision between itself and superoxide. That is, the reaction rate is "diffusion-limited".

The high efficiency of superoxide dismutase seems necessary: even at the subnanomolar concentrations achieved by the high concentrations of SOD within cells, superoxide inactivates the citric acid cycle enzyme aconitase, can poison energy metabolism, and releases potentially toxic iron. Aconitase is one of several iron-sulfur-containing (de)hydratases in metabolic pathways shown to be inactivated by superoxide.

== Evolution ==
The phylogenetic relationships among superoxide dismutases (SODs) are one of many genetic components that have been used to help reconstruct an early timeline of events and predict the evolutionary descent of species, individuals, or genes from a common ancestor over time. Around the period of Earth's transition from anaerobic to aerobic conditions about 2.4 billion years ago (bya), the evolution of SOD enzymes crucially allowed organisms to overcome the effects of oxidative stress following the surge of molecular oxygen (O_{2}) in the atmosphere (Miller 2012). However, evidence suggests that the origination of reactive oxygen species (ROS) took place as early as 4.1 to 3.5 bya (Inupakutika et al. 2016). For the first aerobic organisms, survival depended largely on their ability to defend against ROS. For this reason, it is relevant to understand the environmental constraints that allowed such protective defense enzymes to evolve.

=== The great oxidation event ===
Atmospheric and oceanic compositions have drastically changed since the formation of early Earth. One significant event, the Great Oxidation Event (GOE), marked the period of time in which oxygen became a major component of Earth's atmosphere and surface ocean. However, the physical or biochemical drivers responsible for the transition from a reducing to oxidizing environment remains up for debate (Olejarz et al. 2021). To date, the evolution of cyanobacteria and cyanobacterial photosynthesis is commonly accepted as the primary driver of oxygen production, alongside several physical events behaving as proximal drivers of environmental state change (Kasting 2013; Inupakutika et al. 2016).

=== Selective pressure and enzyme evolution ===
The atmospheric accumulation of highly reactive O_{2} likely exercised a strong selective pressure against anaerobic organisms, and led to the adaptive evolution of oxygen utilization in metabolism (Boden et al. 2021). The process of oxidative phosphorylation and aerobic respiration permitted a 400-fold increase in energy extraction efficiency per mole glucose as compared to anaerobic respiration. Although the increased yield of adenosine triphosphate (ATP), a common form of cellular energy currency, was metabolically beneficial, the tradeoff between efficiency and risk to the metabolic machinery grew more prominent. Behaving as the terminal electron acceptor during cellular respiration, the high rate of O_{2} electron flux is accompanied by an increased risk of ROS formation, which can induce irreversible damage to cellular organelles and their processes (Case 2017). In response to the accumulation of the hazardous metabolic byproducts of aerobic respiration, biological systems evolved various strategies to counteract O_{2} toxicity.

=== The rise of antioxidants ===
During the transition from aerobic to anaerobic conditions, phylogenetic investigations suggest that SODs are ancient molecules, which were likely selected for before the GOE. While it is intuitively assumed that antioxidants emerged during the GOE to defend against O_{2} reactivity and toxicity caused by the accelerated oxygenation of the atmosphere, sequencing and phylogenetic analyses of antioxidant systems from ancient organisms suggests that antioxidant enzymes including SODs may have originated long before the surge of atmospheric and oceanic O_{2} (Wolfe-Simon et al. 2005; Inupakutika et al. 2016).

=== Necessity of ROS-defense mechanisms ===
The oxidizing capacity of O_{2} makes it a highly efficient final electron acceptor for several biological processes, producing more energy per mole substrate relative to other available electron acceptors during aerobic respiration (Boden et al. 2021). On the other hand, its high reactivity also contributes to the uncontrolled removal of electrons, which underlies pathological cell damage through the propagation of highly reactive oxygen-containing molecules.

Superoxide (O2•^{−}) is the most common reactive free-radical formed by the univalent reduction of O_{2}. While they are known to exhibit beneficial roles in some cellular processes, superoxide free radicals also possess the ability to initiate a cascade of ROS and free-radical species formation in biological systems. As a consequence, the unrestrained and potentially lethal accumulation of ROS threatens to damage many biomolecules: lipids, proteins, DNA, and host cells. Additionally, oxidative stress in excess is understood to participate in the dysregulation of cellular processes and disease development (Zewen et al. 2018).

To maintain a balance of intracellular superoxide, organisms have developed strategies to protect against overexposure. One such mechanism functions to catalyze the dismutation of superoxide radicals into hydrogen peroxide and oxygen, which is accomplished by SOD enzymes.

=== Independent evolution of SOD families ===
Studies examining the phylogenetic distribution of SODs support the proposal that the major physiological function of SOD is to act as a protective mechanism among oxygen-metabolizing organisms against the formation of superoxide free radicals (McCord et al. 1971). Although the enzyme is functionally limited to the conversion of superoxide radicals into less toxic oxygen-containing molecules, methodological approaches utilizing phylogenetic and structural protein analysis suggest that three SOD isoforms have evolved independently to combat superoxide accumulation. Each enzyme family is characterized by a distinct 3D structure, amino acid sequence, and with regard to the metal-binding cofactor(s) used to support its structural stability and catalytic activity (Case 2017): either manganese (MnSOD), nickel (NiSOD), or both copper and zinc (Miller 2012). An additional family utilizing an iron cofactor (FeSOD) has also been identified, which is evolutionarily related to MnSOD (Wolfe-Simon et al. 2005). The evolution of metalliform diversity can likely be explained by changes in heavy metal bioavailability that took place during large compositional changes of the earth's early atmosphere and oceans.

==== Fe/MnSODs ====
SODs containing Fe (FeSOD), Mn (MnSOD), or may contain either (Fe/MnSOD) are believed to have been the earliest SOD isoforms among life on early earth. During this time, Fe and Mn would have been highly bioavailable. The differences between the oxidation and reduction potentials of each metal is thought to have been advantageous to organism survival, allowing them to exist in environments with varying O_{2} concentration and metal availability.

==== CuZnSODs ====
The most modern SOD family is believed to utilize both Cu and Zn ions (CuZnSOD). The absence of CuZnSODs from archaeal and protist genomes coupled with the post-GOE increased bioavailability of Cu and Zn suggests that the development of this isoform took place at a later period in evolutionary time (Banci et al. 2005; Wilkinson et al. 2006).

==== NiSODs ====
The family of Ni-containing SODs (NiSOD) is less understood. Evidence suggests that these isoforms are largely distributed among marine bacteria and algae (Wolfe-Simon et al. 2005; Dupont et al. 2008). The evolution of NiSOD is currently predicted to have occurred around the time of the GOE when a decrease in aquatic bioavailability of Fe took place.

== Stability and folding mechanism ==
SOD1 is an extremely stable protein. In the holo form (both copper and zinc bound) the melting point is > 90 °C. In the apo form (no copper or zinc bound) the melting point is ~60 °C. By differential scanning calorimetry (DSC), holo SOD1 unfolds by a two-state mechanism: from dimer to two unfolded monomers. In chemical denaturation experiments, holo SOD1 unfolds by a three-state mechanism with observation of a folded monomeric intermediate.

== Physiology ==
Superoxide is one of the main reactive oxygen species in the cell. As a consequence, SOD serves a key antioxidant role. The physiological importance of SODs is illustrated by the severe pathologies evident in mice genetically engineered to lack these enzymes. Mice lacking SOD2 die several days after birth, amid massive oxidative stress. Mice lacking SOD1 develop a wide range of pathologies, including hepatocellular carcinoma, an acceleration of age-related muscle mass loss, an earlier incidence of cataracts, and a reduced lifespan. Mice lacking SOD3 do not show any obvious defects and exhibit a normal lifespan, though they are more sensitive to hyperoxic injury. Knockout mice of any SOD enzyme are more sensitive to the lethal effects of superoxide-generating compounds, such as paraquat and diquat (herbicides).

Drosophila lacking SOD1 have a dramatically shortened lifespan, whereas flies lacking SOD2 die before birth. Depletion of SOD1 and SOD2 in the nervous system and muscles of Drosophila is associated with reduced lifespan. The accumulation of neuronal and muscular ROS appears to contribute to age-associated impairments. When overexpression of mitochondrial SOD2 is induced, the lifespan of adult Drosophila is extended.

Among black garden ants (Lasius niger), the lifespan of queens is an order of magnitude greater than of workers despite no systematic nucleotide sequence difference between them. The SOD3 gene was found to be the most differentially over-expressed in the brains of queen vs worker ants. This finding raises the possibility of an important role of antioxidant function in modulating lifespan.

SOD knockdowns in the worm C. elegans do not cause major physiological disruptions. However, the lifespan of C. elegans can be extended by superoxide/catalase mimetics suggesting that oxidative stress is a major determinant of the rate of aging.

Knockout or null mutations in SOD1 are highly detrimental to aerobic growth in the budding yeast Saccharomyces cerevisiae and result in a dramatic reduction in post-diauxic lifespan. In wild-type S. cerevisiae, DNA damage rates increased 3-fold with age, but more than 5-fold in mutants deleted for either the SOD1 or SOD2 genes. Reactive oxygen species levels increase with age in these mutant strains and show a similar pattern to the pattern of DNA damage increase with age. Thus it appears that superoxide dismutase plays a substantial role in preserving genome integrity during aging in S. cerevisiae. SOD2 knockout or null mutations cause growth inhibition on respiratory carbon sources in addition to decreased post-diauxic lifespan.

In the fission yeast Schizosaccharomyces pombe, deficiency of mitochondrial superoxide dismutase SOD2 accelerates chronological aging.

Several prokaryotic SOD null mutants have been generated, including E. coli. The loss of periplasmic CuZnSOD causes loss of virulence and might be an attractive target for new antibiotics.

== Role in disease ==
Mutations in the first SOD enzyme (SOD1) can cause familial amyotrophic lateral sclerosis (ALS, a form of motor neuron disease). The most common mutation in the U.S. is A4V, while the most intensely studied is G93A. Inactivation of SOD1 causes hepatocellular carcinoma. Diminished SOD3 activity has been linked to lung diseases such as acute respiratory distress syndrome (ARDS) or chronic obstructive pulmonary disease (COPD). Superoxide dismutase is not expressed in neural crest cells in the developing fetus. Hence, high levels of free radicals can cause damage to them and induce dysraphic anomalies (neural tube defects).

Mutations in SOD1 can cause familial ALS (several pieces of evidence also show that wild-type SOD1, under conditions of cellular stress, is implicated in a significant fraction of sporadic ALS cases, which represent 90% of ALS patients.), by a mechanism that is presently not understood, but not due to loss of enzymatic activity or a decrease in the conformational stability of the SOD1 protein. Overexpression of SOD1 has been linked to the neural disorders seen in Down syndrome. In patients with thalassemia, SOD will increase as a form of compensation mechanism. However, in the chronic stage, SOD does not seem to be sufficient and tends to decrease due to the destruction of proteins from the massive reaction of oxidant-antioxidant.

In mice, the extracellular superoxide dismutase (SOD3, ecSOD) contributes to the development of hypertension. Inactivation of SOD2 in mice causes perinatal lethality.

== Medical uses ==
Supplementary superoxide dimutase has been suggested as a treatment to prevent bronchopulmonary dysplasia in infants who are born preterm, however, the effectiveness of his treatment is not clear.

== Research ==
SOD has been used in experimental treatment of chronic inflammation in inflammatory bowel conditions. SOD may ameliorate cis-platinum-induced nephrotoxicity (rodent studies). As "Orgotein" or "ontosein", a pharmacologically-active purified bovine liver SOD, it is also effective in the treatment of urinary tract inflammatory disease in man. For a time, bovine liver SOD even had regulatory approval in several European countries for such use. This was cut short by concerns about prion disease.

An SOD-mimetic agent, TEMPOL, is currently in clinical trials for radioprotection and to prevent radiation-induced dermatitis. TEMPOL and similar SOD-mimetic nitroxides exhibit a multiplicity of actions in diseases involving oxidative stress.

The synthesis of enzymes such as superoxide dismutase, L-ascorbate oxidase, and Delta 1 DNA polymerase is initiated in plants with the activation of genes associated with stress conditions for plants. The most common stress conditions can be injury, drought or soil salinity. Limiting this process initiated by the conditions of strong soil salinity can be achieved by administering exogenous glutamine to plants. The decrease in the level of expression of genes responsible for the synthesis of superoxide dismutase increases with the increase in glutamine concentration.

Oral SOD derived from Bacillus amyloliquefaciens has been evaluated in randomized controlled trials. An 8-week placebo-controlled trial in healthy adults demonstrated reductions in exercise-induced oxidative stress and enhancement of endogenous antioxidant enzyme activities. A separate trial in women undergoing in vitro fertilization found that oral SOD supplementation increased serum catalase activity over 12 weeks compared to baseline, suggesting improvement in antioxidant defense.

== Cosmetic uses ==
SOD may reduce free radical damage to skin—for example, to reduce fibrosis following radiation for breast cancer. Studies of this kind must be regarded as tentative, however, as there were not adequate controls in the study including a lack of randomization, double-blinding, or placebo. Superoxide dismutase is known to reverse fibrosis, possibly through de-differentiation of myofibroblasts back to fibroblasts.

== Commercial sources ==
SOD is commercially obtained from marine phytoplankton, bovine liver, horseradish, cantaloupe, and certain bacteria. For therapeutic purpose, SOD is usually injected locally. There is no evidence that ingestion of unprotected SOD or SOD-rich foods can have any physiological effects, as all ingested SOD is broken down into amino acids before being absorbed. However, ingestion of SOD bound to wheat proteins could improve its therapeutic activity, at least in theory.

== See also ==
- Catalase
- Glutathione peroxidase
- NADPH oxidase, an enzyme which produces superoxide
- Peroxidase
