= Thymic involution =

Involution (shrinking) of the thymus after the neonatal period

- Specialty: Immunology
- Symptoms: shrinking of thymus

Thymic involution is the shrinking (involution) of the thymus with age, resulting in changes in the architecture of the thymus and a decrease in tissue mass. Thymus involution is one of the major characteristics of vertebrate immunology, and occurs in almost all vertebrates, from birds, teleosts, amphibians to reptiles, although the thymi of a few species of sharks are known not to involute. This process is genetically regulated, with the nucleic material responsible forming an example of a conserved sequence — one maintained through natural selection (though the pressures shaping this are unclear as will be discussed) since it arose in a common ancestor of all species now exhibiting it, via a phenomenon known to bioinformaticists as an orthologic sequence homology.

T-cells are named for the thymus where T-lymphocytes migrate from bone marrow to mature. Its regression has been linked to a reduction in immunosurveillance and the rise of infectious disease and cancer incidence in the elderly (in some cases risk is inversely proportional to thymus size). Though thymic involution has been linked to immunosenescence, it is not induced by senescence as the organ starts involuting from a young age: in humans, as early as the first year after birth.

== Progression ==
=== Neonatal period ===
Though the thymus is fully developed before birth, newborns have an essentially empty peripheral immune compartment immediately after birth. Hence, T lymphocytes are not present in the peripheral lymphoid tissues, where naïve, mature lymphocytes are stimulated to respond to pathogens. In order to populate the peripheral system, the thymus increases in size and upregulates its function during the early neonatal period.

=== Age-relatedness ===
Though some sources cite puberty as the time of onset, other studies have reported thymic involution to start much earlier. The crucial distinction came from the observation that the thymus consists of two main components: the true thymic epithelial space (TES) and the perivascular space (PVS). Thymopoiesis, or T-cell maturation, only occurs in the former. In humans, the TES starts decreasing from the first year of life at a rate of 3% until middle age (35–45 years of age), whereupon it decreases at a rate of 1% until death. Accordingly, the thymus should stop functioning at around 105 years of age; but, studies with bone marrow transplant patients have shown that the thymi of the majority of patients over forty were unable to build a naïve T cell compartment.

With both qualitative and quantitative changes to thymus production occurring with age, involution corresponds with the progressive deterioration of the stroma of the thymus and a significant loss of thymic epithelial cells (TECs). Thymic epithelial cells aid in Thymopoiesis and the development of new T-cells.

== Effects ==
The ability of the immune system to mount a strong protective response depends on the receptor diversity of naive T cells (TCR). Thymic involution results in a decreased output of naïve T lymphocytes – mature T cells that are tolerant to self antigens, responsive to foreign antigens, as yet unstimulated by a foreign substance. In adults, naïve T-cells are hypothesized to be primarily maintained through homeostatic proliferation, or cell division of existing naïve T cells. Though homeostatic proliferation helps sustain TCR even with minimal to nearly absent thymic activity, it does not increase the receptor diversity. For as yet unknown reasons, TCR diversity drops drastically around age 65. Loss of thymic function and TCR diversity is thought to contribute to weaker immune function in the elderly, including increasing instances of diseases such as cancers, autoimmunity, and opportunistic infections.

=== Acute involution and treatment implications ===
Growing evidence indicates that thymic involution is plastic and can be therapeutically halted/reversed to help boost the immune system. Under certain circumstances, the thymus has been shown to undergo acute thymic involution (alternatively called transient involution). For example, transient involution has been induced in humans and other animals by stressors such as infections, pregnancy, and malnutrition. The thymus has also been shown to decrease during hibernation and, in frogs, change in size depending on the season, growing smaller in the winter. Studies on acute thymic involution may help in developing treatments for patients, who for example are unable to restore immune function after chemotherapy, ionizing radiation, or infections like HIV. Research has reported the rate of thymus involution to reduce when, for men the testes, or for women the ovaries, were removed; demonstrating that sex hormones, and especially testosterone, have a marked influence on the involution process. However, the manner in which the sex hormones moderate this process is not fully understood. In other research the results of the Greg Fahy TRIIM trial reported clinically significant reversal of thymus involution after the administration of human growth hormone (HGH), Dehydroepiandrosterone (DHEA) and metformin. The two results could mean that HGH and mTOR inhibition in autophagy reverses thymus involution with testosterone advancing thymus involution. Additionally, caloric restriction has been shown to lessen thymic involution due to aging in mice.

== Unknown selective pressures ==
Thymic involution remains an evolutionary mystery since it occurs in most vertebrates despite its negative effects.

Since it is not induced by senescence, many scientists have hypothesized that there may have been evolutionary pressures for the organ to involute. A few hypotheses are as follows:

- Developing T cells that interact strongly within the thymus are induced to undergo programmed cell death. The intended effect is deletion of self-reactive T cells. This works well when the antigen presented within the thymus is truly of self origin, but antigens from pathogenic microbes that infiltrate the thymus have the potential to subvert the process. Rather than deleting T cells that would cause autoimmunity, T cells capable of eliminating the infiltrating pathogen are deleted instead. It has been proposed that one way to minimize this problem is to produce as many long-lived T cells as possible during the time of life when the thymus is most likely to be pristine, generally when organisms are young and under the protection of a functional maternal immune system. Thus, in mice and humans, for example, the best time to have a prodigiously functional thymus is prior to birth.

In turn, it is well known from Williams' theory of the evolution of senescence that strong selection for enhanced early function readily accommodates, through antagonistic pleiotropy, deleterious later occurring effects, thus potentially accounting for the especially early demise of the thymus.

- The disposable soma hypothesis and life history hypothesis say similarly that tradeoffs are involved in thymic involution. Since the immune system must compete with other bodily systems, notably reproduction, for limited physiological resources, the body must invest in the immune system differentially at different stages of life. There is high immunological investment in youth since immunological memory is low.
- Other hypotheses suggest that thymic involution is directly adaptive. For example, some hypotheses have proposed that thymic involution may help in avoidance of autoimmunity or other dangers, prevention of infection, and production of an optimal repertoire of T-cells.
- Zinc deficiency may also play a role.
