= SOD2 =

Enzyme

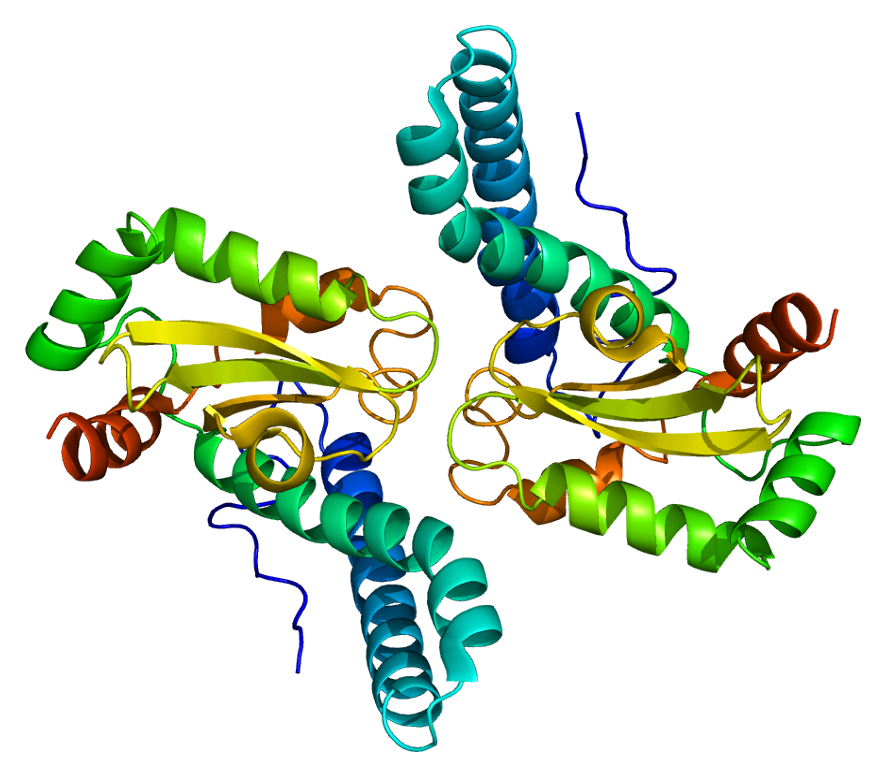

Identifiers
- Aliases: SOD2, IPOB, MNSOD, MVCD6, IPO-B, Mn-SOD, superoxide dismutase 2, mitochondrial, superoxide dismutase 2, GClnc1
- External IDs: OMIM: 147460; MGI: 98352; GeneCards: SOD2
Available structures
PDB	Ortholog search: PDBe RCSB
PDB	List of PDB id codes 1AP5, 1AP6, 1EM1, 1JA8, 1LUV, 1LUW, 1MSD, 1N0J, 1N0N, 1PL4, 1PM9, 1QNM, 1SZX, 1VAR, 1XDC, 1XIL, 1ZSP, 1ZTE, 1ZUQ, 2ADP, 2ADQ, 2GDS, 2P4K, 2QKA, 2QKC, 3C3S, 3C3T
Enzyme activity
EC #	BRENDA	ExPASy	KEGG	MetaCyc
1.15.1.1	↗	↗	↗	↗

Gene location (Human)
Chr.	Chromosome 6 (human)
Band	6q25.3	Start	159,669,069 bp
Band	6q25.3	End	159,762,529 bp

Gene location (Mouse)
Chr.	Chromosome 17 (mouse)
Band	17 A1|17 8.75 cM	Start	13,225,733 bp
Band	17 A1|17 8.75 cM	End	13,258,950 bp
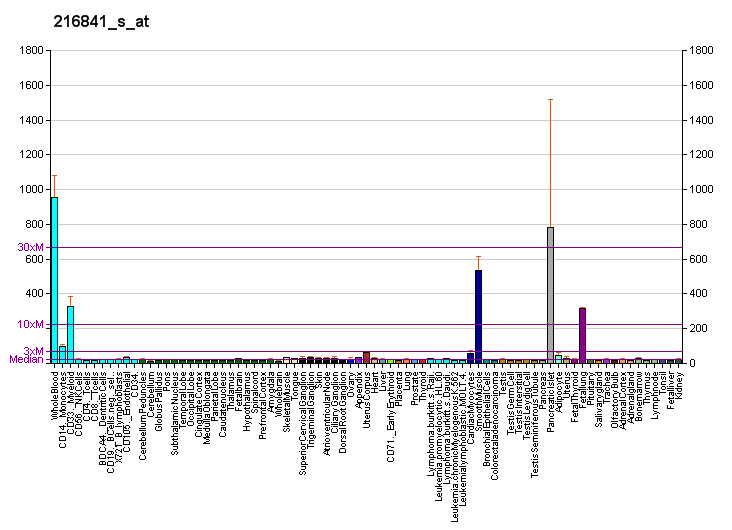

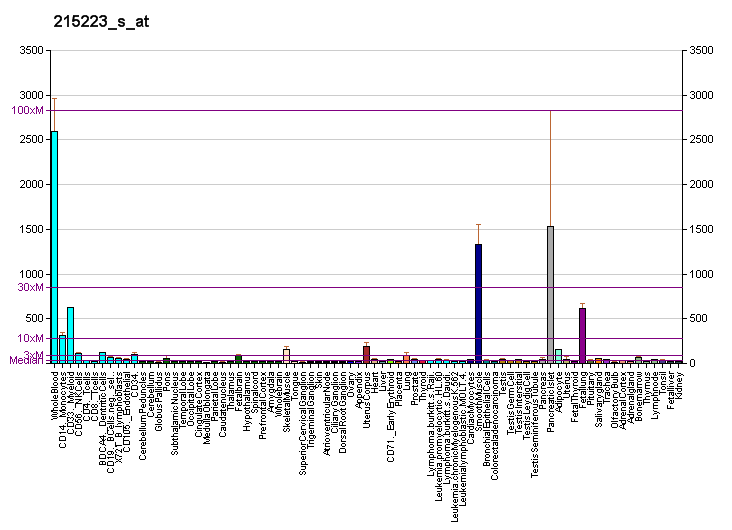
RNA expression pattern
Bgee	Human / Mouse (ortholog); Top expressed in: gastrocnemius muscle; beta cell; Achilles tendon; blood; cartilage tissue; gastric mucosa; monocyte; gallbladder; epithelium of colon; left adrenal gland / Top expressed in: right ventricle; right kidney; atrioventricular valve; myocardium of ventricle; cardiac muscles; Epithelium of choroid plexus; facial motor nucleus; endocardial cushion; intercostal muscle; digastric muscle; More reference expression data
BioGPS	More reference expression data
Gene ontology
Molecular function	superoxide dismutase activity; manganese ion binding; metal ion binding; identical protein binding; oxidoreductase activity
Cellular component	mitochondrion; extracellular exosome; mitochondrial matrix
Biological process	negative regulation of neuron apoptotic process; response to superoxide; regulation of transcription by RNA polymerase II; removal of superoxide radicals; acetylcholine-mediated vasodilation involved in regulation of systemic arterial blood pressure; regulation of blood pressure; negative regulation of oxidative stress-induced intrinsic apoptotic signaling pathway; protein homotetramerization; oxygen homeostasis; release of cytochrome c from mitochondria; superoxide metabolic process; negative regulation of cell population proliferation; positive regulation of cell migration; mitochondrion organization; cellular response to oxidative stress; interleukin-12-mediated signaling pathway; ageing; negative regulation of vascular associated smooth muscle cell proliferation; positive regulation of vascular associated smooth muscle cell apoptotic process; positive regulation of vascular associated smooth muscle cell differentiation involved in phenotypic switching
Sources:Amigo / QuickGO
Orthologs
Databases	NCBI: entry; OMA: entry
Species	Human	Mouse
Entrez	6648	20656
Ensembl	ENSG00000112096	ENSMUSG00000006818
UniProt	P04179	P09671
RefSeq (mRNA)	NM_000636; NM_001024465; NM_001024466; NM_001322814; NM_001322815 NM_001322816; NM_001322817; NM_001322819; NM_001322820	NM_013671
RefSeq (protein)	NP_000627; NP_001019636; NP_001019637; NP_001309743; NP_001309744 NP_001309745; NP_001309746; NP_001309748; NP_001309749	NP_038699
Location (UCSC)	Chr 6: 159.67 – 159.76 Mb	Chr 17: 13.23 – 13.26 Mb
PubMed search
- Wikidata
View/Edit Human	View/Edit Mouse

Superoxide dismutase 2, mitochondrial (SOD2), also known as manganese-dependent superoxide dismutase (MnSOD), is an enzyme which in humans is encoded by the SOD2 gene on chromosome 6. A related pseudogene has been identified on chromosome 1. Alternative splicing of this gene results in multiple transcript variants. This gene is a member of the iron/manganese superoxide dismutase family. It encodes a mitochondrial protein that forms a homotetramer and binds one manganese ion per subunit. This protein binds to the superoxide byproducts of oxidative phosphorylation and converts them to hydrogen peroxide and diatomic oxygen. Mutations in this gene have been associated with idiopathic cardiomyopathy (IDC), premature aging, sporadic motor neuron disease, and cancer.

== Structure ==
The SOD2 gene contains five exons interrupted by four introns, an uncharacteristic 5′-proximal promoter that possesses a GC-rich region in place of the TATA or CAAT, and an enhancer in the second intron. The proximal promoter region contains multiple binding sites for transcription factors, including specific-1 (Sp1), activator protein 2 (AP-2), and early growth response 1 (Egr-1). This gene is a mitochondrial member of the iron/manganese superoxide dismutase family. It encodes a mitochondrial matrix protein that forms a homotetramer and binds one manganese ion per subunit. The manganese site forms a trigonal bipyramidal geometry with four ligands from the protein and a fifth solvent ligand. This solvent ligand is a hydroxide believed to serve as the electron acceptor of the enzyme. The active site cavity consists of a network of side chains of several residues associated by hydrogen bonding, extending from the aqueous ligand of the metal. Of note, the highly conserved residue Tyr34 plays a key role in the hydrogen-bonding network, as nitration of this residue inhibits the protein's catalytic ability. This protein also possesses an N-terminal mitochondrial leader sequence which targets it to the mitochondrial matrix, where it converts mitochondrial-generated reactive oxygen species from the respiratory chain to H2. Alternate transcriptional splice variants, encoding different isoforms, have been characterized.

== Function ==
As a member of the iron/manganese superoxide dismutase family, this protein transforms toxic superoxide, a byproduct of the mitochondrial electron transport chain, into hydrogen peroxide and diatomic oxygen. This function allows SOD2 to clear mitochondrial reactive oxygen species (ROS) and, as a result, confer protection against cell death. As a result, this protein plays an antiapoptotic role against oxidative stress, ionizing radiation, and inflammatory cytokines.

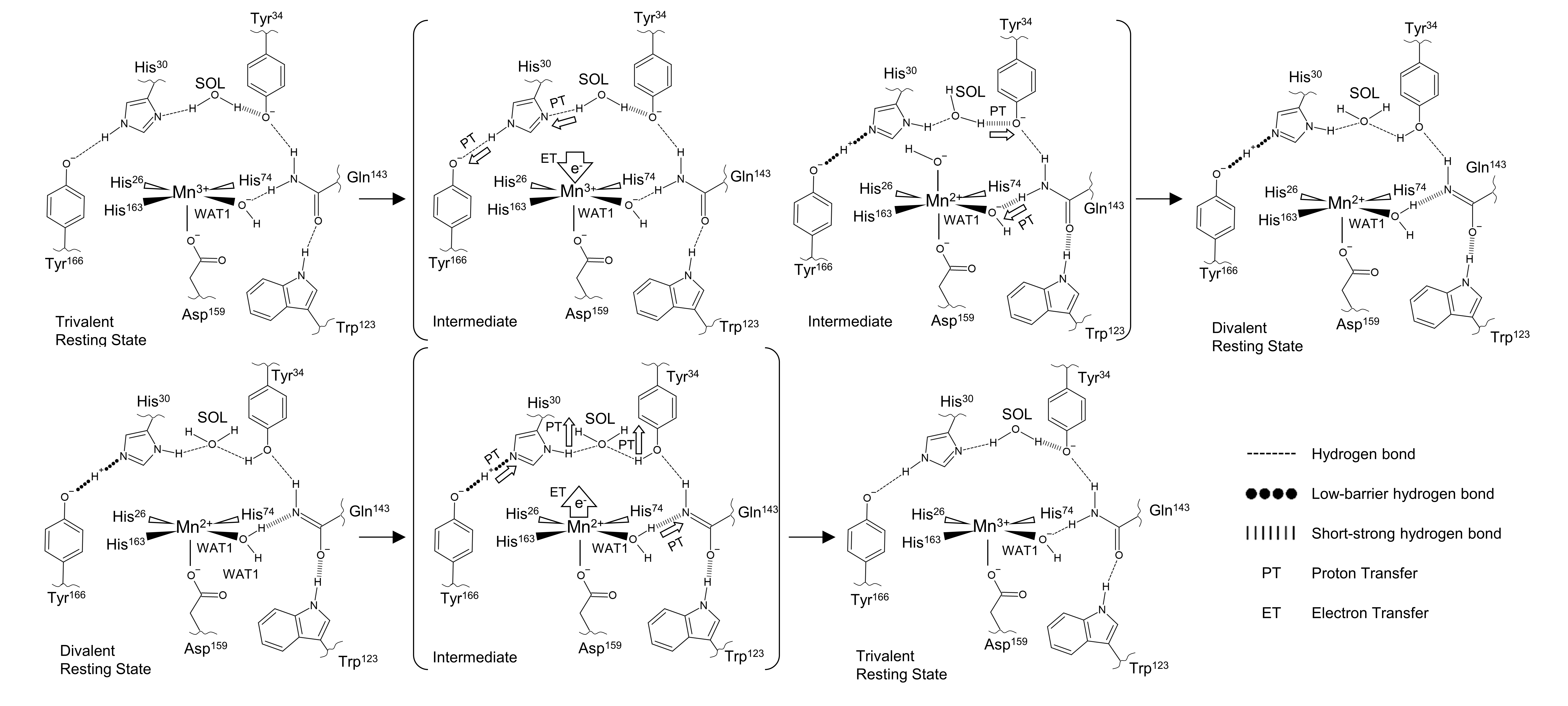
The SOD2 proton-coupled electron transfer mechanism

=== Mechanism ===
SOD2 uses cyclic proton-coupled electron transfer reactions to convert superoxide (O_{2}^{•-}) into either oxygen (O_{2}) or hydrogen peroxide (H_{2}O_{2}), depending on the oxidation state of the manganese metal and the protonation status of the active site.

Mn^{3+} + O_{2}^{•-} ↔ Mn^{2+} + O_{2}

Mn^{2+} + O_{2}^{•-} + 2H^{+} ↔ Mn^{3+} + H_{2}O_{2}

The protons of the active site have been directly visualized and revealed that SOD2 utilizes a series of proton transfers among its active site residues per electron transfer step. The findings demonstrate the use of unusual chemistry by the enzyme that include a glutamine that is cyclically deprotonated and protonated and amino acids with pK_{a}s that are significantly different from expected values. Low-barrier and short-strong hydrogen bonds are seen contributing to catalysis by promoting proton transfers and stabilizing intermediates in a fashion similar to those of some catalytic Asp-Ser-His triads.

== Clinical significance ==
The SOD2 enzyme is an important constituent in apoptotic signaling and oxidative stress, most notably as part of the mitochondrial death pathway and cardiac myocyte apoptosis signaling. Programmed cell death is a distinct genetic and biochemical pathway essential to metazoans. An intact death pathway is required for successful embryonic development and the maintenance of normal tissue homeostasis. Apoptosis has proven to be tightly interwoven with other essential cell pathways. The identification of critical control points in the cell death pathway has yielded fundamental insights for basic biology, as well as provided rational targets for new therapeutics a normal embryologic processes, or during cell injury (such as ischemia-reperfusion injury during heart attacks and strokes) or during developments and processes in cancer, an apoptotic cell undergoes structural changes including cell shrinkage, plasma membrane blebbing, nuclear condensation, and fragmentation of the DNA and nucleus. This is followed by fragmentation into apoptotic bodies that are quickly removed by phagocytes, thereby preventing an inflammatory response. It is a mode of cell death defined by characteristic morphological, biochemical and molecular changes. It was first described as a "shrinkage necrosis", and then this term was replaced by apoptosis to emphasize its role opposite mitosis in tissue kinetics. In later stages of apoptosis the entire cell becomes fragmented, forming a number of plasma membrane-bounded apoptotic bodies which contain nuclear and or cytoplasmic elements. The ultrastructural appearance of necrosis is quite different, the main features being mitochondrial swelling, plasma membrane breakdown and cellular disintegration. Apoptosis occurs in many physiological and pathological processes. It plays an important role during embryonal development as programmed cell death and accompanies a variety of normal involutional processes in which it serves as a mechanism to remove "unwanted" cells.

=== Cancer risk ===
Numerous studies have reported associations between SOD2 polymorphisms and cancer risk, but results have been inconsistent. An updated meta-analysis of such studies revealed that SOD2 polymorphisms are related to the development of non-Hodgkin lymphoma, lung cancer, and colorectal cancer.

=== Role in oxidative stress ===
Most notably, SOD2 is pivotal in reactive oxygen species (ROS) release during oxidative stress by ischemia-reperfusion injury, specifically in the myocardium as part of a heart attack (also known as ischemic heart disease). Ischemic heart disease, which results from an occlusion of one of the major coronary arteries, is currently still the leading cause of morbidity and mortality in western society. During ischemia reperfusion, ROS release substantially contribute to the cell damage and death via a direct effect on the cell as well as via apoptotic signals. SOD2 is known to have a capacity to limit the detrimental effects of ROS. As such, SOD2 is important for its cardioprotective effects. In addition, SOD2 has been implicated in cardioprotection against ischemia-reperfusion injury, such as during ischemic preconditioning of the heart. Although a large burst of ROS is known to lead to cell damage, a moderate release of ROS from the mitochondria, which occurs during nonlethal short episodes of ischemia, can play a significant triggering role in the signal transduction pathways of ischemic preconditioning leading to reduction of cell damage. It has even observed that during this release of ROS, SOD2 plays an important role hereby regulating apoptotic signaling and cell death.

Due to its cytoprotective effects, overexpression of SOD2 has been linked to increased invasiveness of tumor metastasis. Its role in controlling ROS levels also involves it in ageing, cancer, and neurodegenerative disease. Mutations in this gene have been associated with idiopathic cardiomyopathy (IDC), sporadic motor neuron disease, and cancer. A common polymorphism associated with greater susceptibility to various pathologies is found in the mitochondrial leader targeting sequence (Val9Ala). Mice lacking Sod2 die shortly after birth, indicating that unchecked levels of superoxide are incompatible with mammalian life. However, mice 50% deficient in Sod2 have a normal lifespan and minimal phenotypic defects but do suffer increased DNA damage and increased incidence of cancer. In Drosophila melanogaster, over-expression of Sod2 has been shown to increase maximum lifespan by 20% in one study, and by as much as 37% in another study.

== Yeast studies ==
In wild-type budding yeast Saccharomyces cerevisiae nuclear DNA fragmentation increased 3-fold during cellular aging, whereas in the absence of SOD2 nuclear DNA fragmentation increased by 5-fold during aging. Production of reactive oxygen species also increased with cellular age, but by a greater amount in SOD2 mutant cells than in wild-type cells. In the fission yeast Schizosaccharomyces pombe, SOD2 deficiency, drastically increased cellular aging and decreased cell viability in the stationary phase of the growth cycle.

== Role in invertebrates ==
SOD2's significant role in oxidative stress management makes it an essential component of the mitochondria. As a result, SOD2 similarly to SOD1 and SOD3 is highly conserved in vertebrates as well as in invertebrates. In the study Multiple measures of functionality exhibit progressive decline in a parallel, stochastic fashion in Drosophilla Sod2 mutants. In SOD2 mutants there was a cascade of deterioration within the organ systems. These deterioration were not linear in that one organ's system would fail then the other, rather on the contrary the deterioration were parallel, meaning that various systems would be affected at any given time. The build up of ROS's in the flies did play a substantial role in affecting the organ system s of the flies in such a way, that though not all observed flies suffered permanent damage, the damages that were observed were like those associated with old age in mature fruit flies. The tissues that are affected in light of defective SOD2 in invertebrates are the muscles, heart, and brain. ROS's effect on these tissue results in not only loss of cellular function in most cases, but a substantial loss in longevity. Though SOD2's role in oxidative stress management is one that has been accepted for both vertebrates and invertebrates, its necessity has been questioned by a study that was conducted on Caenorhabditis elegans (C. elegans). The correlation between the lack of defective SOD2 and loss of longevity and function is generally understood, however it was discovered that the removal of some of the five members of the SOD family including SOD2 resulted in the increase in longevity in mutant C. elegans compared to the wild type.

== Animal studies ==
When animals are exercised at a relatively high work rate, exercise training promotes an increase in myocardial MnSOD activity. Increased MnSOD activity is required to achieve optimal training-induced protection against both ischemia/reperfusion(IR)-induced cardiac arrhythmias and infarction Using an antisense oligonucleotide against MnSOD to prevent ExTr-induced increases in myocardial MnSOD activity, it was demonstrated that an increase in myocardial MnSOD activity is required to provide training-induced protection against IR-induced myocardial infarction. Using a MnSOD gene silencing approach, reported that prevention of the ExTr-induced increase in myocardial MnSOD resulted in a loss of training-induced protection against IR-mediated arrhythmias.

In a mouse model, mitochondrial oxidative stress caused by SOD2 deficiency promoted cellular senescence and aging phenotypes in the skin including an increase in DNA double-strand breaks (see DNA damage theory of aging). Loss of epidermal SOD2 in mice induced cellular senescence, which irreversibly arrested proliferation of a fraction of keratinocytes. In older mice SOD2 deficiency delayed wound closure and reduced epidermal thickness.

Mutant mice with a connective tissue specific lack of SOD2 had a reduced lifespan and a premature onset of aging-related phenotypes such as weight loss, skin atrophy, kyphosis (curvature of the spine), osteoporosis, and muscle degeneration.

SOD2 over-expression was found to extend lifespan in mice.

== Interactions ==
The SOD2 gene has been shown to bind:

- Sp1,
- NF-κB,
- AP-1,
- AP-2,
- Egr-1,
- CREB,
- p53, and
- NFE2L2.

The SOD2 protein has been shown to interact with HIV-1 Tat and HIV-1 Vif.
