= Superoxide =

Any chemical compound containing an O2 ion (charge –1)

- Lewis structure of superoxide. The six outer-shell electrons of each oxygen atom are shown in black; one electron pair is shared (middle); the unpaired electron is shown in the upper-left; and the additional electron conferring a negative charge is shown in red.

Names
- IUPAC name Superoxide
- Systematic IUPAC name Dioxidan-2-idylide
- Other names Hyperoxide, Dioxide(1−)

Identifiers
CAS Number	11062-77-4
3D model (JSmol)	Interactive image
ChEBI	CHEBI:18421
ChemSpider	4514331
Gmelin Reference	487
KEGG	C00704
PubChem CID	5359597
UNII	0S9K0E25FL
- InChI: InChI=1S/O2/c1-2/q-1 Key: MXDZWXWHPVATGF-UHFFFAOYSA-N
- SMILES: O=[O-]

Properties
Chemical formula	O_{2}^{−}
Molar mass	31.998 g·mol^{−1}
Conjugate acid	Hydroperoxyl
- Except where otherwise noted, data are given for materials in their standard state (at 25 °C [77 °F], 100 kPa). Infobox references

In chemistry, a superoxide is a compound that contains the superoxide ion, which has the chemical formula O_{2}^{−}. The systematic name of the anion is dioxide(1−). The reactive oxygen ion superoxide is particularly important as the product of the one-electron reduction of dioxygen O_{2}, which occurs widely in nature. Molecular oxygen (dioxygen) is a diradical containing two unpaired electrons, and superoxide results from the addition of an electron which fills one of the two degenerate molecular orbitals, leaving a charged ionic species with a single unpaired electron and a net negative charge of −1. Both dioxygen and the superoxide anion are free radicals that exhibit paramagnetism. Superoxide was historically also known as "hyperoxide".

== Salts ==
Superoxide forms salts with alkali metals and alkaline earth metals. The salts sodium superoxide (NaO_{2}), potassium superoxide (KO_{2}), rubidium superoxide (RbO_{2}) and caesium superoxide (CsO_{2}) are prepared by the reaction of O_{2} with the respective alkali metal.

The alkali salts of O_{2}^{−} are orange-yellow in color and quite stable, if kept dry. In water, the dissolved O_{2}^{−} disproportionates extremely rapidly (written here for a basic solution):

4 O_{2}^{−} + 2 H_{2}O → 3 O_{2} + 4 OH^{−}

This reaction (with moisture and carbon dioxide in exhaled air) underlies the use of potassium superoxide as an oxygen source in chemical oxygen generators, as on the Space Shuttle and submarines, and in firefighters' oxygen tanks.

More generally, the superoxide anion, O_{2}^{−}, is a weak Brønsted base. Its protonated form, hydroperoxyl (HO_{2}), has pK_{a} around 4.8, and superoxide anion predominates at neutral pH:

O_{2}^{−} + H_{2}O ⇌ HO_{2} + OH^{−}

Hydroperoxyl is a strong oxidant, but superoxide is a strong nucleophile and reductant. Disproportionation to oxygen and peroxide occurs whenever the two coexist.

Potassium superoxide is soluble in dimethyl sulfoxide (facilitated by crown ethers) and is stable as long as protons are not available. Superoxide can also be generated in aprotic solvents by cyclic voltammetry.

Superoxide salts also decompose in the solid state, but this process requires heating:

2 NaO_{2} → Na_{2}O_{2} + O_{2}

== Biology ==
Superoxide is common in biology, reflecting the pervasiveness of O_{2} and its ease of reduction. Superoxide is implicated in a number of biological processes, some with negative connotations, and some with beneficial effects.

Like hydroperoxyl, superoxide is classified as reactive oxygen species. It is generated by the immune system to kill invading microorganisms. In phagocytes, superoxide is produced in large quantities by the enzyme NADPH oxidase for use in oxygen-dependent killing mechanisms of invading pathogens. Mutations in the gene coding for the NADPH oxidase cause an immunodeficiency syndrome called chronic granulomatous disease, characterized by extreme susceptibility to infection, especially catalase-positive organisms. In turn, micro-organisms genetically engineered to lack the superoxide-scavenging enzyme superoxide dismutase (SOD) lose virulence. Superoxide is also deleterious when produced as a byproduct of mitochondrial respiration (most notably by Complex I and Complex III), as well as several other enzymes, for example xanthine oxidase, which can catalyze the transfer of electrons directly to molecular oxygen under strongly reducing conditions. Superoxide has been proposed to mediate long-distance electron transport between cytochrome c and Complex III through the aqueous solution, which suggests a role for mitochondrial regulation of reactive oxygen species.

Because superoxide is toxic at high concentrations, nearly all aerobic organisms express SOD. SOD efficiently catalyzes the disproportionation of superoxide:

2 HO_{2} → O_{2} + H_{2}O_{2}

Other proteins that can be both oxidized and reduced by superoxide (such as hemoglobin) have weak SOD-like activity. Genetic inactivation ("knockout") of SOD produces deleterious phenotypes in organisms ranging from bacteria to mice and have provided important clues as to the mechanisms of toxicity of superoxide in vivo.

Yeast lacking both mitochondrial and cytosolic SOD grow very poorly in air, but quite well under anaerobic conditions. Absence of cytosolic SOD causes a dramatic increase in mutagenesis and genomic instability. Mice lacking mitochondrial SOD (MnSOD) die around 21 days after birth due to neurodegeneration, cardiomyopathy, and lactic acidosis. Mice lacking cytosolic SOD (CuZnSOD) are viable but suffer from multiple pathologies, including reduced lifespan, liver cancer, muscle atrophy, cataracts, thymic involution, haemolytic anemia, and a very rapid age-dependent decline in female fertility.

Superoxide may contribute to the pathogenesis of many diseases (the evidence is particularly strong for radiation poisoning and hyperoxic injury), and perhaps also to aging via the oxidative damage that it inflicts on cells. While the action of superoxide in the pathogenesis of some conditions is strong (for instance, mice and rats overexpressing CuZnSOD or MnSOD are more resistant to strokes and heart attacks), the role of superoxide in aging must be regarded as unproven, for now. In model organisms (yeast, the fruit fly Drosophila, and mice), genetically knocking out CuZnSOD shortens lifespan and accelerates certain features of aging: (cataracts, muscle atrophy, macular degeneration, and thymic involution). But the converse, increasing the levels of CuZnSOD, does not seem to consistently increase lifespan (except perhaps in Drosophila). The most widely accepted view is that oxidative damage (resulting from multiple causes, including superoxide) is but one of several factors limiting lifespan.

The binding of O_{2} by reduced (Fe^{2+}) heme proteins involves formation of Fe(III) superoxide complex.

=== Assay in biological systems ===
The assay of superoxide in biological systems is complicated by its short half-life. One approach that has been used in quantitative assays converts superoxide to hydrogen peroxide, which is relatively stable. Hydrogen peroxide is then assayed by a fluorimetric method. As a free radical, superoxide has a strong EPR signal, and it is possible to detect superoxide directly using this method. For practical purposes, this can be achieved only in vitro under non-physiological conditions, such as high pH (which slows the spontaneous dismutation) with the enzyme xanthine oxidase. Researchers have developed a series of tool compounds termed "spin traps" that can react with superoxide, forming a meta-stable radical (half-life 1–15 minutes), which can be more readily detected by EPR. Superoxide spin-trapping was initially carried out with DMPO, but phosphorus derivatives with improved half-lives, such as DEPPMPO and DIPPMPO, have become more widely used.

== Bonding and structure ==
Superoxides are compounds in which the oxidation number of oxygen is −1/2. Whereas molecular oxygen (dioxygen) is a diradical containing two unpaired electrons, the addition of a second electron fills one of its two degenerate molecular orbitals, leaving a charged ionic species with single unpaired electron and a net negative charge of −1. Both dioxygen and the superoxide anion are free radicals that exhibit paramagnetism.

The derivatives of dioxygen have characteristic O–O distances that correlate with the order of the O–O bond.

Dioxygen compound	name	O–O distance (Å)	O–O bond order
O_{2}^{+}	dioxygenyl cation	1.12	2.5
O_{2}	dioxygen	1.21	2
O_{2}^{−}	superoxide	1.28	1.5
O_{2}^{2−}	peroxide	1.49	1

== See also ==
- Oxygen, O_{2}
- Ozonide, O_{3}^{−}
- Peroxide, O_{2}^{2−}
- Oxide, O^{2−}
- Dioxygenyl, O_{2}^{+}
- Antimycin A – used in fishery management, this compound produces large quantities of this free radical.
- Paraquat – used as a herbicide, this compound produces large quantities of this free radical.
- Xanthine oxidase – This form of the enzyme xanthine dehydrogenase produces large amounts of superoxide.
