= Praseodymium carbide =

Praseodymium carbide may refer to:

- Praseodymium sesquicarbide, Pr_{2}C_{3}
- Praseodymium dicarbide, PrC_{2}
