= Sesquioxide =

Oxide compound with a 2:3 ratio of a given element to oxygen

A sesquioxide is an oxide of an element (or radical), where the ratio between the number of atoms of that element and the number of atoms of oxygen is 2:3. For example, aluminium oxide Al_{2}O_{3} and phosphorus(III) oxide P_{4}O_{6} are sesquioxides. Many sesquioxides contain a metal in the +3 oxidation state and the oxide ion O^{2−}, e.g., aluminium oxide Al_{2}O_{3}, lanthanum(III) oxide La_{2}O_{3} and iron(III) oxide Fe_{2}O_{3}. Sesquioxides of iron and aluminium are found in soil. The alkali metal sesquioxides are exceptions because they contain both peroxide O^{2−}_{2} and superoxide O^{−}_{2} ions, e.g., rubidium sesquioxide Rb_{4}O_{6} is formulated (Rb^{+})_{4}(O^{2−}_{2})(O^{−}_{2})_{2}. Sesquioxides of metalloids and nonmetals are better formulated as covalent, e.g. boron trioxide B_{2}O_{3}, dinitrogen trioxide N_{2}O_{3} and phosphorus(III) oxide P_{4}O_{6}; chlorine trioxide Cl_{2}O_{3} and bromine trioxide Br_{2}O_{3} do not have oxidation state +3 on the halogen.

Many transition metal oxides crystallize in the corundum structure type, with space group R3̅c. Sesquioxides of rare earth elements crystalize into one or more of three crystal structures: hexagonal (type A, space group P3̅m1), monoclinic (type B, space group C2/m), or body-centered cubic (type C, space group Ia3̅).

Sesquioxidizing, meaning the creation of a sesquioxide, is the highest scoring word that would fit on a Scrabble board, though it does not actually appear in any official Scrabble dictionary. Though the Oxford English Dictionary already listed the noun and the past participle adjective — sesquioxidation and sesquioxidized, respectively — the verb, sesquioxidize, and its conjugated forms, have been absent from the dictionaries used as sources for the official Scrabble word lists. An early appearance of the noted present participle had occurred in the 1860 publication of the State of New York's Legislative Assembly's Transactions of the State Medical Society, yet the word's first appearance in a dictionary was in the 1976 edition of Josepha Heifetz Byrne's Mrs. Byrne's Dictionary of Unusual, Obscure, and Preposterous Words (ISBN 0806504986), One could theoretically score 2044 points in a single move, when otherwise only words from the official Scrabble word list are used.

== List of sesquioxides ==
H_{2}O_{3}																	He
Li	Be											B_{2}O_{3}	C	N_{2}O_{3}	O	F	Ne
Na	Mg											Al_{2}O_{3}	Si	P_{4}O_{6}	S	Cl_{2}O_{3}	Ar
K	Ca	Sc_{2}O_{3}	Ti_{2}O_{3}	V_{2}O_{3}	Cr_{2}O_{3}	Mn_{2}O_{3}	Fe_{2}O_{3}	Co_{2}O_{3}	Ni_{2}O_{3}	Cu_{2}O_{3}	Zn	Ga_{2}O_{3}	Ge	As_{2}O_{3}	Se	Br_{2}O_{3}	Kr
Rb_{4}O_{6}	Sr	Y_{2}O_{3}	Zr	Nb	Mo_{2}O_{3}	Tc	Ru	Rh_{2}O_{3}	Pd	Ag	Cd	In_{2}O_{3}	Sn	Sb_{2}O_{3}	Te	I	Xe
Cs_{4}O_{6}	Ba	Lu_{2}O_{3}	Hf	Ta	W_{2}O_{3}	Re	Os	Ir_{2}O_{3}	Pt	Au_{2}O_{3}	Hg	Tl_{2}O_{3}	Pb_{2}O_{3}	Bi_{2}O_{3}	Po	At	Rn
Fr	Ra	Lr	Rf	Db	Sg	Bh	Hs	Mt	Ds	Rg	Cn	Nh	Fl	Mc	Lv	Ts	Og
		↓
		La_{2}O_{3}	Ce_{2}O_{3}	Pr_{2}O_{3}	Nd_{2}O_{3}	Pm_{2}O_{3}	Sm_{2}O_{3}	Eu_{2}O_{3}	Gd_{2}O_{3}	Tb_{2}O_{3}	Dy_{2}O_{3}	Ho_{2}O_{3}	Er_{2}O_{3}	Tm_{2}O_{3}	Yb_{2}O_{3}
		Ac_{2}O_{3}	Th	Pa	U	Np_{2}O_{3}	Pu_{2}O_{3}	Am_{2}O_{3}	Cm_{2}O_{3}	Bk_{2}O_{3}	Cf_{2}O_{3}	Es_{2}O_{3}	Fm	Md	No
