= Rubidium sesquioxide =

Identifiers
| 3D model (JSmol) | Interactive image |
| PubChem CID | 160136017 |
- InChI: InChI=1S/3O2.4Rb/c3*1-2;;;;/q-2;2*-1;4*+1 Key: QZSXBJDVQYXYOD-UHFFFAOYSA-N
- SMILES: [Rb+].[Rb+].[Rb+].[Rb+].[O-][O-].O=[O-].O=[O-]

Properties
| Chemical formula | Rb_{4}O_{6} |
| Molar mass | 437.865 g·mol^{−1} |
| Appearance | Black crystals |
| Melting point | 461 °C (862 °F; 734 K) |

Structure
| Crystal structure | Pu_{2}C_{3} structure type (body-centered cubic) |
| Space group | I4̅3d (No. 220) |
| Lattice constant | a = 932 pm |
| Formula units (Z) | 4 |

Related compounds
| Other cations | Caesium sesquioxide |
| Related rubidium oxides | Rubidium suboxide; Rubidium oxide; Rubidium peroxide; Rubidium superoxide; Rubidium ozonide |
- Except where otherwise noted, data are given for materials in their standard state (at 25 °C [77 °F], 100 kPa). Infobox references

Rubidium sesquioxide is a chemical compound with the formula Rb_{2}O_{3} or more accurately Rb_{4}O_{6}. In terms of oxidation states, rubidium in this compound has a nominal charge of +1, and the oxygen is a mixed peroxide (O^{2−}_{2}) and superoxide (O^{−}_{2}) for a structural formula of (Rb^{+})_{4}(O^{−}_{2})_{2}(O^{2−}_{2}). It has been studied theoretically as an example of a strongly correlated material.

== Structure ==
The compound crystallizes in a body-centered cubic form with the same crystal structure as Pu_{2}C_{3} and Cs_{4}O_{6}.

== Preparation ==
Rubidium sesquioxide can be prepared by reacting the peroxide Rb_{2}O_{2} and the superoxide RbO_{2}:

Rb_{2}O_{2} + 2 RbO_{2} → 2 Rb_{2}O_{3}

== History ==
It was initially discovered in 1907, and more thoroughly characterized in 1939.

The compound was predicted to be a rare example of a ferromagnetic compound that is magnetic due to a p-block element, and a half-metal that was conducting in the minority spin band. However, while the material does have exotic magnetic behavior, experimental results instead showed an electrically insulating magnetically frustrated system. Rb_{4}O_{6} also displays a Verwey transition where charge ordering appears at 290 K.
