= Phosphorus trioxide =

Chemical compound

Phosphorus(III) oxide
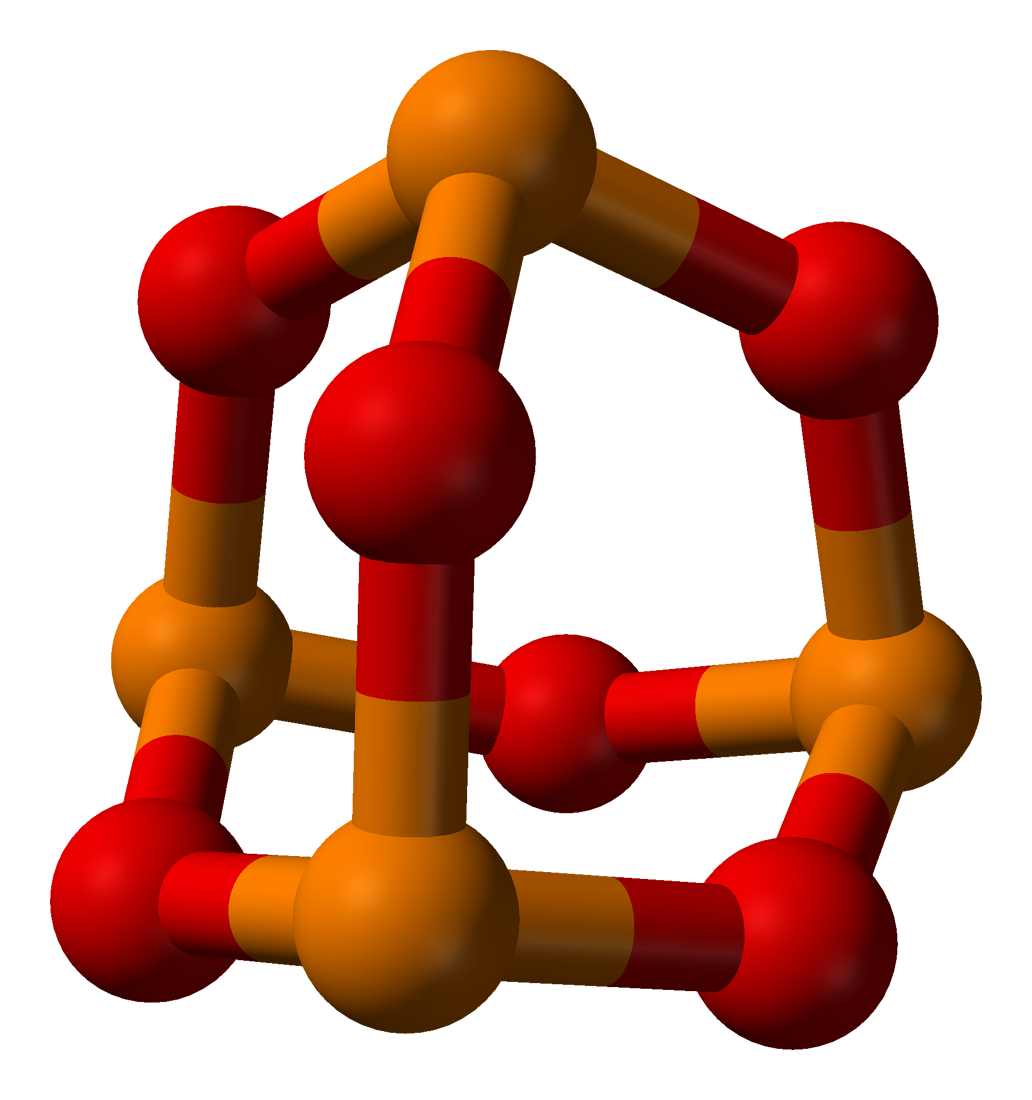
- Ball-and-stick model of the P4O6 molecule Phosphorus in orange, oxygen in red

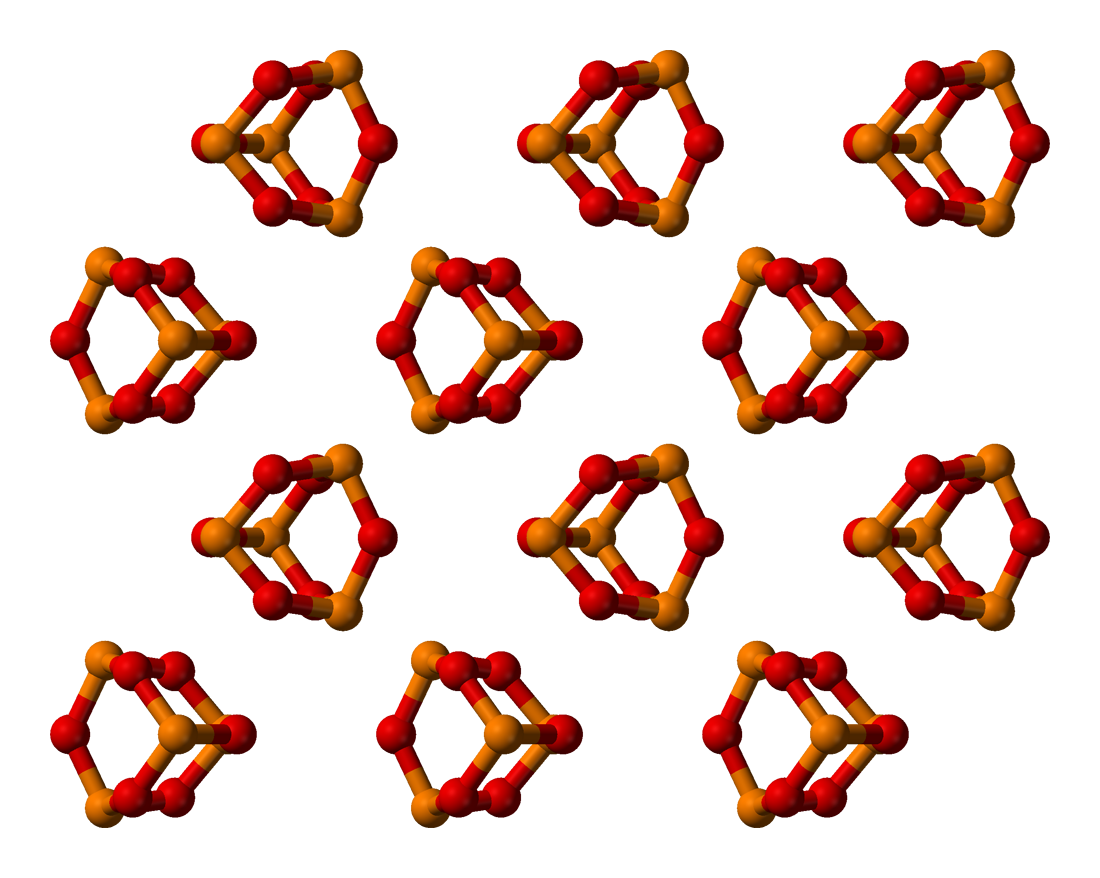
- Packing of P4O6 molecules in the crystal structure

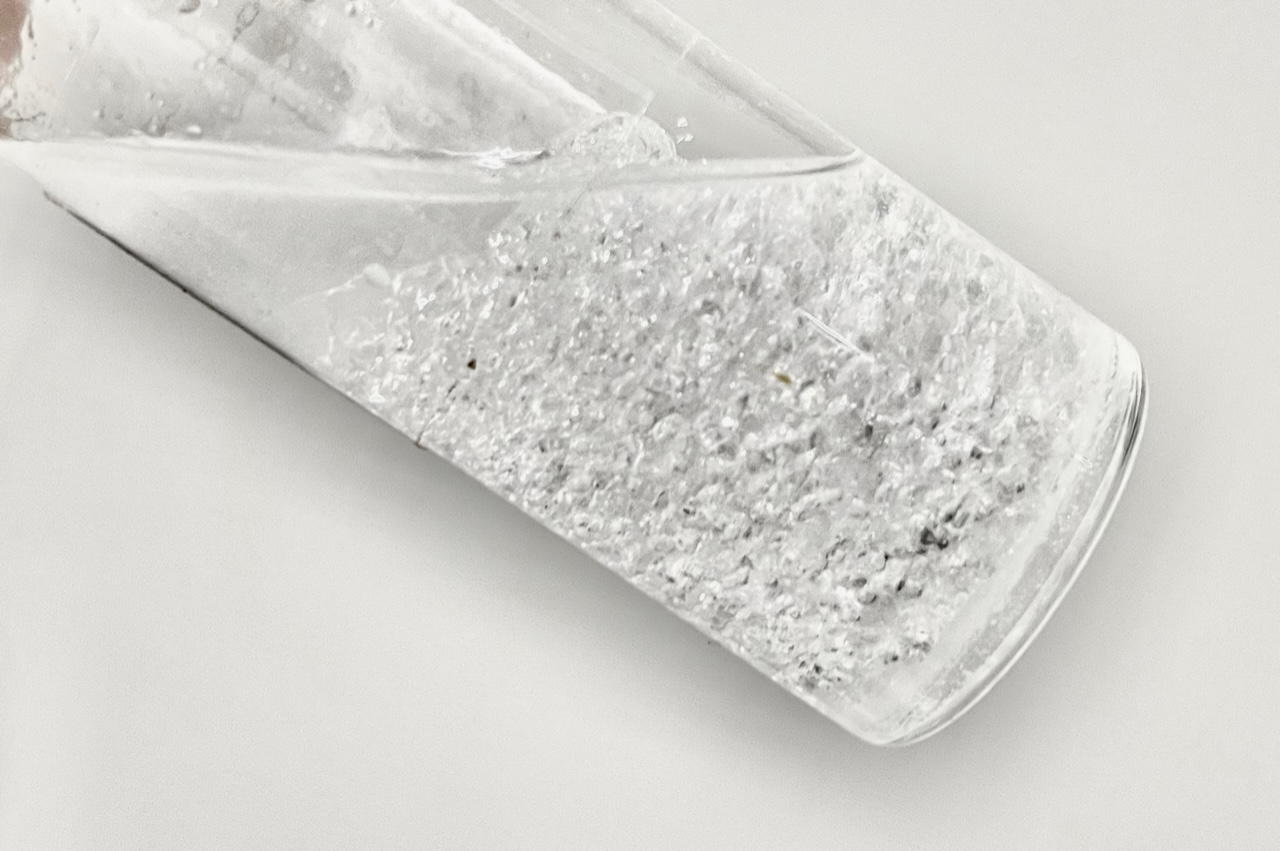
- Liquid and solid phosphorus trioxide at its melting point

Names
- IUPAC names Tetraphosphorus hexaoxide Tricyclo[3.3.1.1^{3,7}]tetraphosphoxane
- Systematic IUPAC name 2,4,6,8,9,10-Hexaoxa-1,3,5,7-tetraphosphatricyclo[3.3.1.1^{3,7}]decane
- Other names Phosphorus sesquioxide Phosphorous anhydride Tetraphosphorous hexoxide

Identifiers
| CAS Number | 1314-24-5 |
| 3D model (JSmol) | Interactive image |
| ChEBI | CHEBI:37372 |
| ChemSpider | 109897 |
| ECHA InfoCard | 100.032.414 |
| EC Number | 235-670-5 |
| Gmelin Reference | 26856 |
| PubChem CID | 123290 |
| UNII | 0LTR52K7HK |
| CompTox Dashboard (EPA) | DTXSID80907588 |
- InChI: InChI=1S/O6P4/c1-7-2-9-4-8(1)5-10(3-7)6-9 Key: VSAISIQCTGDGPU-UHFFFAOYSA-N; InChI=1/O6P4/c1-7-2-9-4-8(1)5-10(3-7)6-9 Key: VSAISIQCTGDGPU-UHFFFAOYAV
- SMILES: O1P3OP2OP(OP1O2)O3

Properties
| Chemical formula | P_{4}O_{6} |
| Molar mass | 219.88 g mol^{−1} |
| Appearance | colourless monoclinic crystals or liquid |
| Density | 2.135 g/cm^{3} |
| Melting point | 23.8 °C (74.8 °F; 296.9 K) |
| Boiling point | 173.1 °C (343.6 °F; 446.2 K) |
| Solubility in water | reacts |
| Acidity (pK_{a}) | 9.4 |

Structure
| Molecular shape | See Text |
| Dipole moment | 0 |

Hazards
- GHS labelling
| Pictograms | (GHS06: Toxic) |
| Signal word | Danger |
| NFPA 704 (fire diamond) | 3 0 0 |

Related compounds
| Other anions | Phosphorus trisulfide |
| Other cations | Dinitrogen trioxide Arsenic trioxide Antimony trioxide |
| Related compounds | Phosphorus pentoxide Phosphorous acid |
- Except where otherwise noted, data are given for materials in their standard state (at 25 °C [77 °F], 100 kPa). verify (what is ?) Infobox references

Phosphorus trioxide is the chemical compound with the molecular formula P_{4}O_{6}. Although the molecular formula suggests the name tetraphosphorus hexoxide, the name phosphorus trioxide preceded the knowledge of the compound's molecular structure, and its usage continues today. This colorless solid is structurally related to adamantane. It is formally the anhydride of phosphorous acid, H_{3}PO_{3}, but cannot be obtained by the dehydration of the acid. A white solid that melts at room temperature, it is waxy, crystalline and highly toxic, with garlic odor.

== Preparation ==
It is obtained by the combustion of phosphorus in a limited supply of air at low temperatures.

P_{4} + 3 O_{2} → P_{4}O_{6}

By-products include red phosphorus suboxide.

== Chemical properties ==
Phosphorus trioxide reacts with water to form phosphorous acid, reflecting the fact that it is the anhydride of that acid.

P_{4}O_{6} + 6 H_{2}O → 4 H_{3}PO_{3}

It reacts with hydrogen chloride to form H_{3}PO_{3} and phosphorus trichloride.

P_{4}O_{6} + 6 HCl → 2 H_{3}PO_{3} + 2 PCl_{3}

With chlorine or bromine it forms the corresponding phosphoryl halide, and it reacts with iodine in a sealed tube to form diphosphorus tetraiodide.

P_{4}O_{6} reacts with ozone at 195 K (−78 °C) to give the unstable compound P_{4}O_{18}.

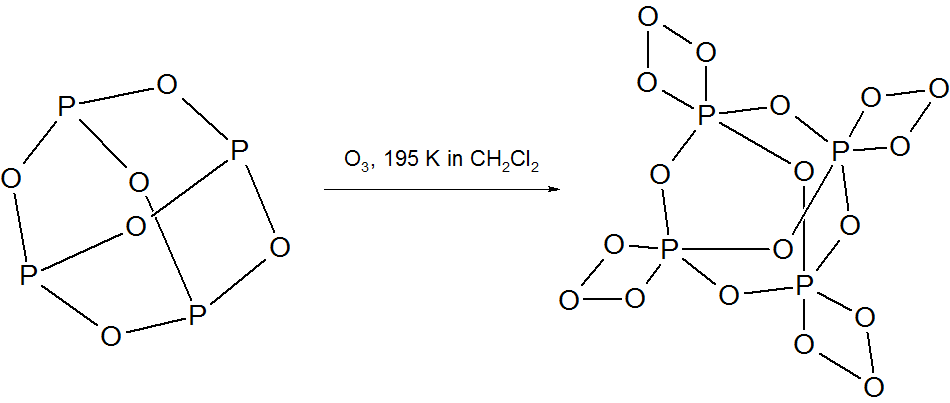

P_{4}O_{18} decomposes above 238 K (−35 °C) in solution with the release of O_{2} gas. Decomposition of dry P_{4}O_{18} is explosive.

In a disproportionation reaction, P_{4}O_{6} is converted into the mixed P(III)P(V) species P_{4}O_{8} when heated in a sealed tube at 710 K (437 °C), with the side product being red phosphorus.

== As a ligand ==
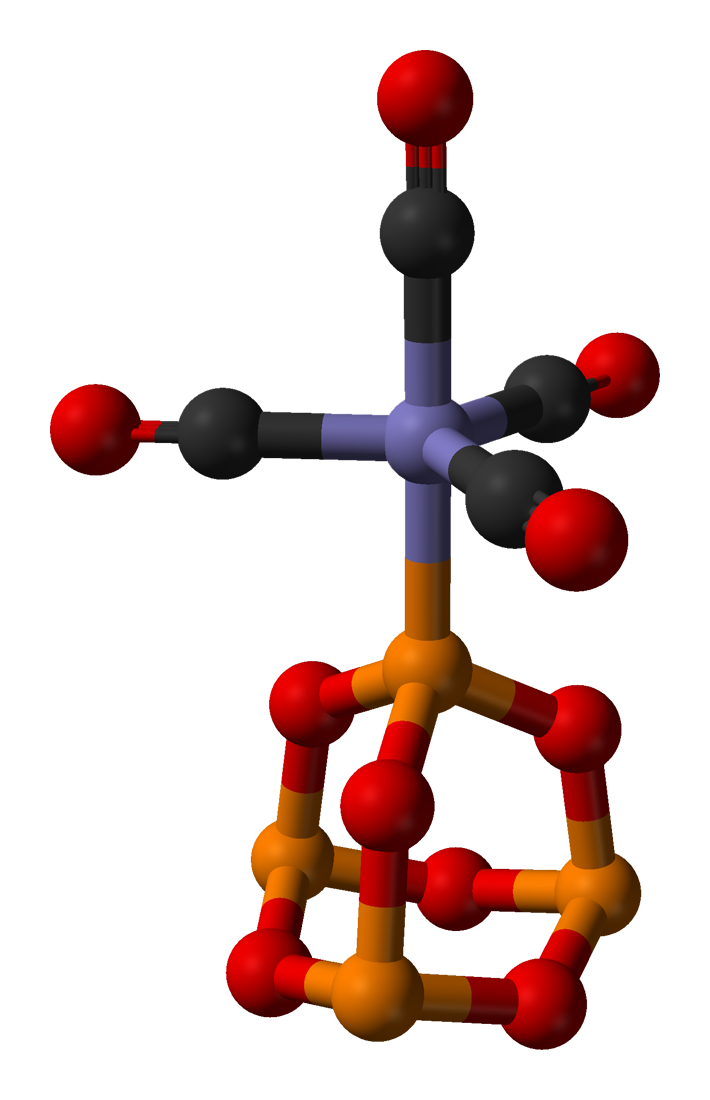
Structure of P_{4}O_{6}·Fe(CO)_{4}.

P_{4}O_{6} is a ligand for transition metals, comparable to phosphite. An illustrative complex is P_{4}O_{6}·Fe(CO)_{4}. With BH_{3}, a dimeric adduct is produced:

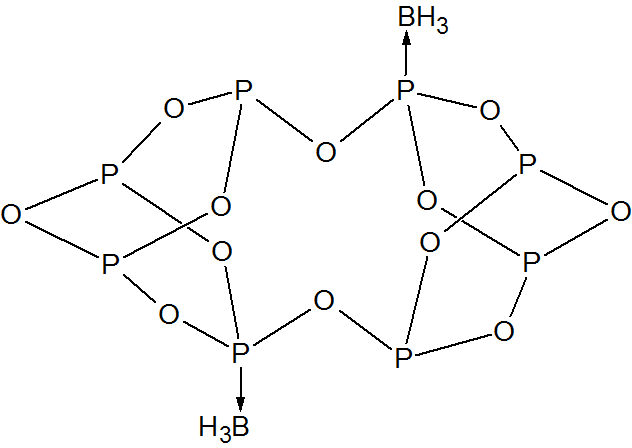
Structure of P_{8}O_{12}(BH_{3})_{2}.
