= Hematite =

Common iron oxide mineral

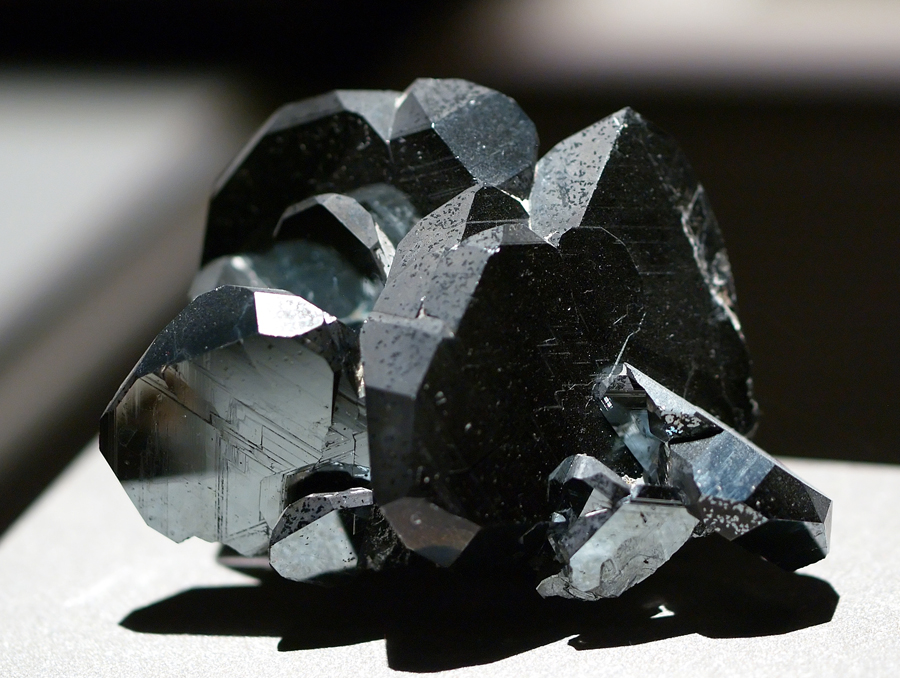
- Hematite crystals from Brazil

General
- Category: Oxide minerals
- Formula: iron(III) oxide, Fe_{2}O_{3}, α-Fe_{2}O_{3}
- IMA symbol: Hem
- Strunz classification: 4.CB.05
- Dana classification: 4.3.1.2
- Crystal system: Trigonal
- Crystal class: Hexagonal scalenohedral (3̅m); H–M symbol: (3̅ 2/m)
- Space group: R3̅c (no. 167)
- Unit cell: a = 5.038(2) Å; c = 13.772(12) Å; Z = 6

Identification
- Color: Metallic grey, dull to bright "rust-red" in earthy, compact, fine-grained material, steel-grey to black in crystals and massively crystalline ores
- Crystal habit: Tabular to thick crystals; micaceous or platy, commonly in rosettes; radiating fibrous, reniform, botryoidal or stalactitic masses, columnar; earthy, granular, oolitic
- Twinning: Penetration and lamellar
- Cleavage: None, may show partings on {0001} and {101̅1}
- Fracture: Uneven to subconchoidal
- Tenacity: Brittle
- Mohs scale hardness: 5.5–6.5
- Luster: Metallic to splendent
- Streak: Bright red to dark red
- Diaphaneity: Opaque
- Specific gravity: 5.26
- Density: 5.26 – 5.3
- Optical properties: Uniaxial (−)
- Refractive index: n_{ω} = 3.150–3.220, n_{ε} = 2.870–2.940
- Birefringence: δ = 0.280
- Pleochroism: O: brownish red; E: yellowish red

Hematite (/ˈhiːmətaɪt, ˈhɛm-/ HE(E)M-ə-tyte), also spelled as haematite, is a common iron oxide compound with the formula Fe_{2}O_{3} and is widely found in rocks and soils. Hematite crystals belong to the rhombohedral lattice system which is designated the alpha polymorph of Fe_{2}O_{3}. It has the same crystal structure as corundum (Al_{2}O_{3}) and ilmenite (FeTiO_{3}). With this crystal structure geometry it forms a complete solid solution at temperatures above 950 °C (1,740 °F).

Hematite occurs naturally in black to steel or silver-gray, brown to reddish-brown, or red colors. It is mined as an important ore mineral of iron. It is electrically conductive. Hematite varieties include kidney ore, martite (pseudomorphs after magnetite), iron rose and specularite (specular hematite). While these forms vary, they all have a rust-red streak. Hematite is not only harder than pure iron, but also much more brittle. The term kidney ore may be broadly used to describe botryoidal, mammillary, or reniform hematite. Maghemite is a polymorph of hematite (γ-Fe_{2}O_{3}) with the same chemical formula, but with a spinel structure like magnetite.

Large deposits of hematite are found in banded iron formations. Gray hematite is typically found in places that have still, standing water, or mineral hot springs, such as those in Yellowstone National Park in North America. The mineral may precipitate in the water and collect in layers at the bottom of the lake, spring, or other standing water. Hematite can also occur in the absence of water, usually as the result of volcanic activity.

Clay-sized hematite crystals also may occur as a secondary mineral formed by weathering processes in soil, and along with other iron oxides or oxyhydroxides such as goethite, which is responsible for the red color of many tropical, ancient, or otherwise highly weathered soils.

== Etymology and history ==
The name hematite is derived from the Greek word for blood, αἷμα (haima), due to the red coloration found in some varieties of hematite. The color of hematite is often used as a pigment. The English name of the stone is derived from Middle French hématite pierre, which was taken from Latin lapis haematites c. the 15th century, which originated from Ancient Greek αἱματίτης λίθος (haimatitēs lithos, "blood-red stone").

Ochre is a clay that is colored by varying amounts of hematite, varying between 20% and 70%. Red ochre contains unhydrated hematite, whereas yellow ochre contains hydrated hematite (Fe_{2}O_{3} · H_{2}O). The principal use of ochre is for tinting with a permanent color.

Use of the red chalk of this iron-oxide mineral in writing, drawing, and decoration is among the earliest in human history. To date, the earliest known human use of the powdery mineral is 164,000 years ago by the inhabitants of the Pinnacle Point caves in what now is South Africa, possibly for social purposes. Hematite residues are also found in graves from 80,000 years ago. Near Rydno in Poland and Lovas in Hungary red chalk mines have been found that are from 5000 BC, belonging to the Linear Pottery culture at the Upper Rhine.

Rich deposits of hematite have been found on the island of Elba that have been mined since the time of the Etruscans.

Underground hematite mining is classified as a carcinogenic hazard to humans.

== Magnetism ==
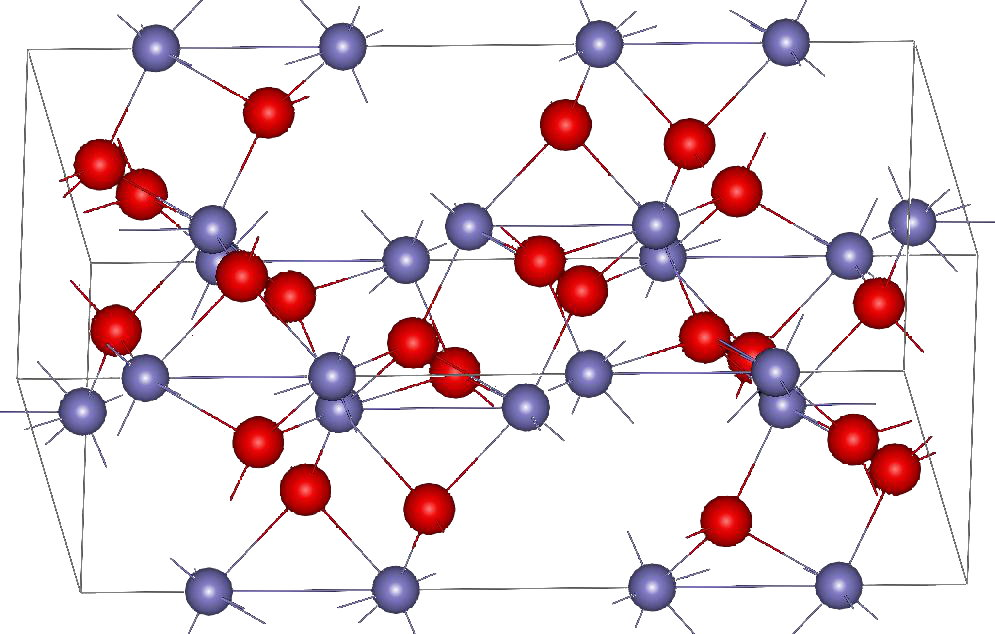
Crystal structure of hematite

Hematite shows only a very feeble response to a magnetic field. Unlike magnetite, it is not noticeably attracted to an ordinary magnet. Hematite is an antiferromagnetic material below the Morin transition at 250 K (−23 °C), and a canted antiferromagnet or weakly ferromagnetic above the Morin transition and below its Néel temperature at 948 K (675 °C), above which it is paramagnetic.

The magnetic structure of α-hematite was the subject of considerable discussion and debate during the 1950s, as it appeared to be ferromagnetic with a Curie temperature of approximately 1,000 K (730 °C), but with an extremely small magnetic moment (0.002 Bohr magnetons). Adding to the surprise was a transition with a decrease in temperature at around 260 K (−13 °C) to a phase with no net magnetic moment. It was shown that the system is essentially antiferromagnetic, but that the low symmetry of the cation sites allows spin–orbit coupling to cause canting of the moments when they are in the plane perpendicular to the c axis. The disappearance of the moment with a decrease in temperature at 260 K (−13 °C) is caused by a change in the anisotropy which causes the moments to align along the c axis. In this configuration, spin canting does not reduce the energy. The magnetic properties of bulk hematite differ from their nanoscale counterparts. For example, the Morin transition temperature of hematite decreases with a decrease in the particle size. The suppression of this transition has been observed in hematite nanoparticles and is attributed to the presence of impurities, water molecules and defects in the crystals lattice. Hematite is part of a complex solid solution oxyhydroxide system having various contents of H_{2}O (water), hydroxyl groups and vacancy substitutions that affect the mineral's magnetic and crystal chemical properties. Two other end-members are referred to as protohematite and hydrohematite.

Enhanced magnetic coercivities for hematite have been achieved by dry-heating a two-line ferrihydrite precursor prepared from solution. Hematite exhibited temperature-dependent magnetic coercivity values ranging from 289 to 5,027 oersteds (23–400 kA/m). The origin of these high coercivity values has been interpreted as a consequence of the subparticle structure induced by the different particle and crystallite size growth rates at increasing annealing temperature. These differences in the growth rates are translated into a progressive development of a subparticle structure at the nanoscale (super small). At lower temperatures (350–600 °C), single particles crystallize. However, at higher temperatures (600–1000 °C), the growth of crystalline aggregates, and a subparticle structure is favored.

== Mine tailings ==
Hematite is present in the waste tailings of iron mines. A recently developed process, magnetation, uses magnets to glean waste hematite from old mine tailings in Minnesota's vast Mesabi Range iron district. Falu red is a pigment used in traditional Swedish house paints. It is made from tailings of the Falun Mine.

== Mars ==
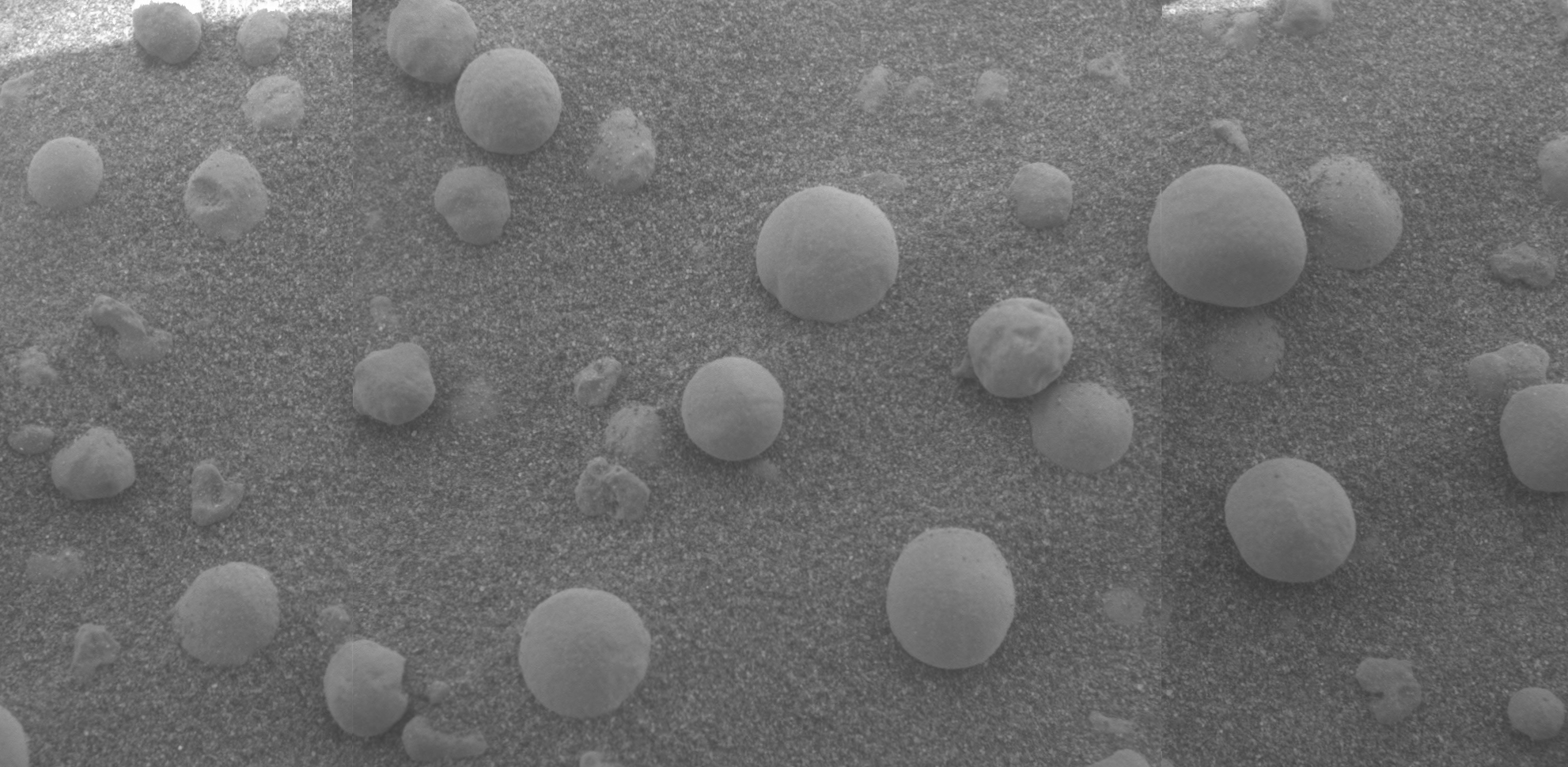
Image mosaic from the Mars Exploration Rover Microscopic Imager shows hematite spherules partly embedded in rock at the Opportunity landing site. Image is around 5 cm (2 in) across.

The spectral signature of hematite was seen on the planet Mars by the infrared spectrometer on the NASA Mars Global Surveyor and 2001 Mars Odyssey spacecraft in orbit around Mars. The mineral was seen in abundance at two sites on the planet, the Terra Meridiani site, near the Martian equator at 0° longitude, and the Aram Chaos site near the Valles Marineris. Several other sites also showed hematite, such as Aureum Chaos. Because terrestrial hematite is typically a mineral formed in aqueous environments or by aqueous alteration, this detection was scientifically interesting enough that the second of the two Mars Exploration Rovers was sent to a site in the Terra Meridiani region designated Meridiani Planum. In-situ investigations by the Opportunity rover showed a significant amount of hematite, much of it in the form of small "Martian spherules" that were informally named "blueberries" by the science team. Analysis indicates that these spherules are apparently concretions formed from a water solution. "Knowing just how the hematite on Mars was formed will help us characterize the past environment and determine whether that environment was favorable for life".

== Jewelry ==
Hematite is often shaped into beads, tumbling stones, and other jewellery components. Hematite was once used as mourning jewelry. Certain types of hematite- or iron-oxide-rich clay, especially Armenian bole, have been used in gilding. Hematite is also used in art such as in the creation of intaglio engraved gems. Hematine is a synthetic material sold as magnetic hematite.

== Pigment ==
Hematite has been sourced to make pigments since earlier origins of human pictorial depictions, such as on cave linings and other surfaces, and has been employed continually in artwork through the eras. In Roman times, the pigment obtained by finely grinding hematite was known as sil atticum. Other names for the mineral when used in painting include colcotar and caput mortuum. In Spanish, it is called almagre or almagra, from the Arabic al-maghrah, red earth, which passed into English and Portuguese. Other ancient names for the pigment include ochra hispanica, sil atticum antiquorum, and Spanish brown. It forms the basis for red, purple, and brown iron-oxide pigments, as well as being an important component of ochre, sienna, and umber pigments. The main producer of hematite for the pigment industry is India, followed distantly by Spain.

== Industrial purposes ==
As mentioned earlier, hematite is an important mineral for iron ore. The physical properties of hematite are also employed in the areas of medical equipment, shipping industries, and coal production. Having high density and capable as an effective barrier against X-ray passage, it often is incorporated into radiation shielding. As with other iron ores, it often is a component of ship ballasts because of its density and economy. In the coal industry, it can be formed into a high specific density solution, to help separate coal powder from impurities.

== Gallery ==
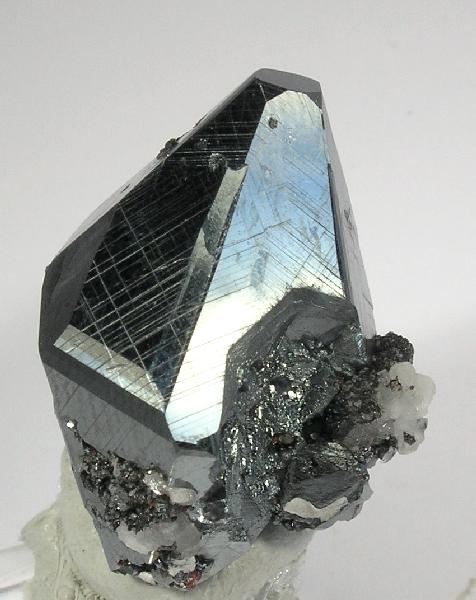
A rare pseudo-scalenohedral crystal habit

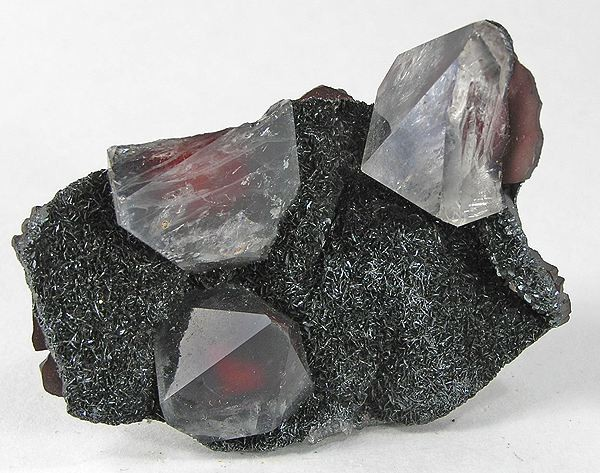
Three gemmy quartz crystals containing bright rust-red inclusions of hematite, on a field of sparkly black specular hematite

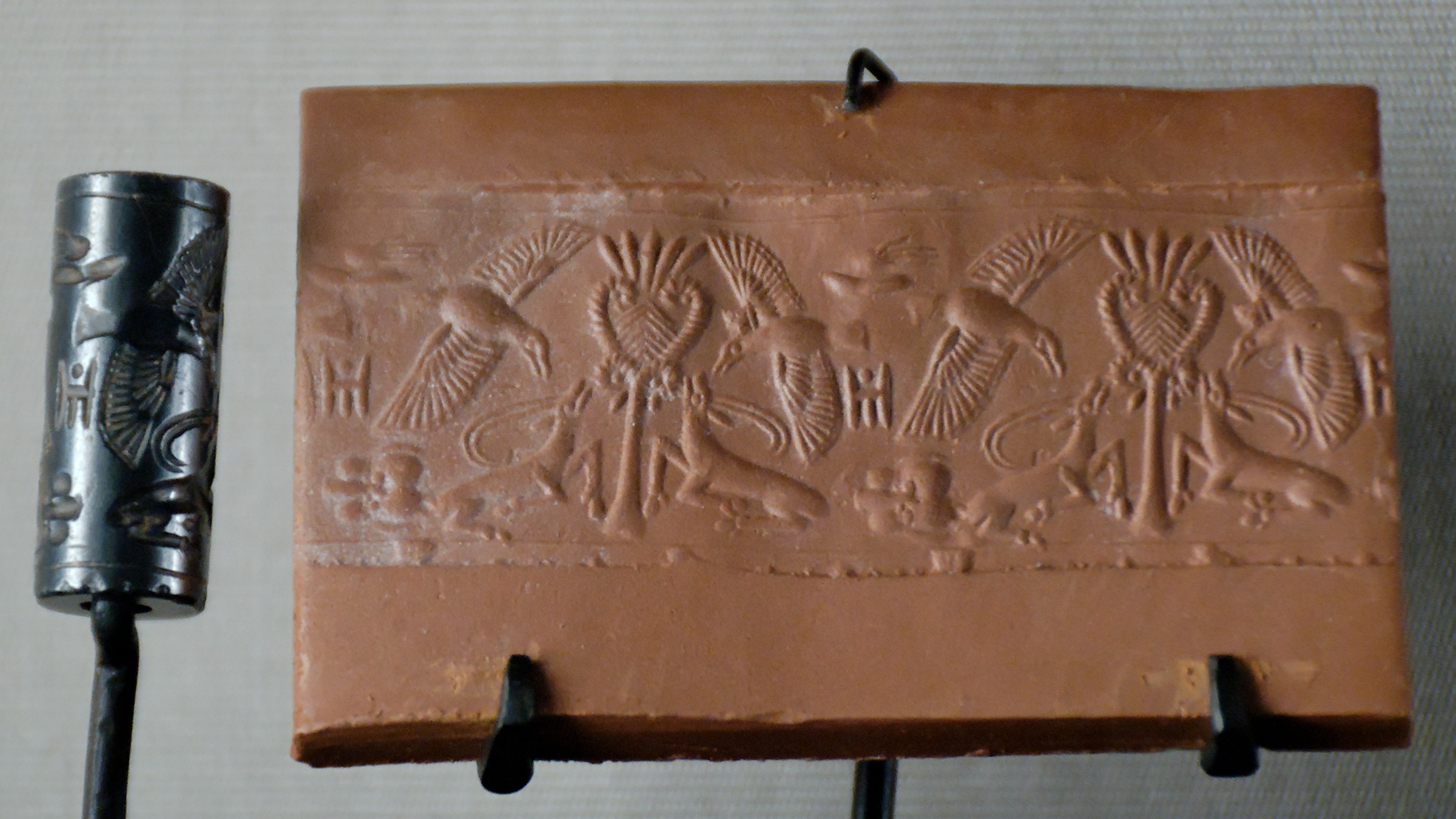
Cypro-Minoan cylinder seal (left) made from hematite with corresponding impression (right), approximately 14th century BC

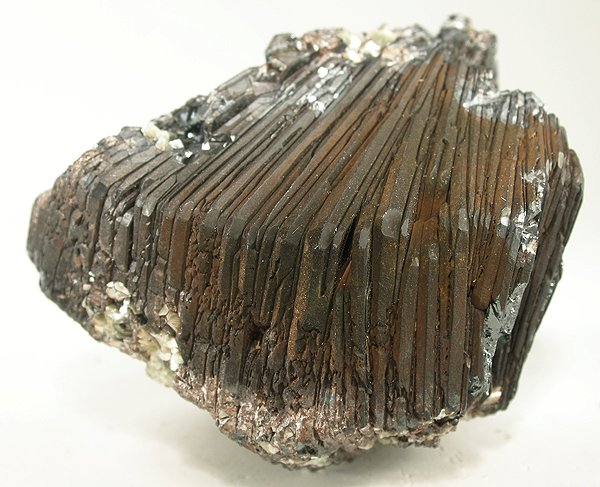
A cluster of parallel-growth, mirror-bright, metallic-gray hematite blades from Brazil

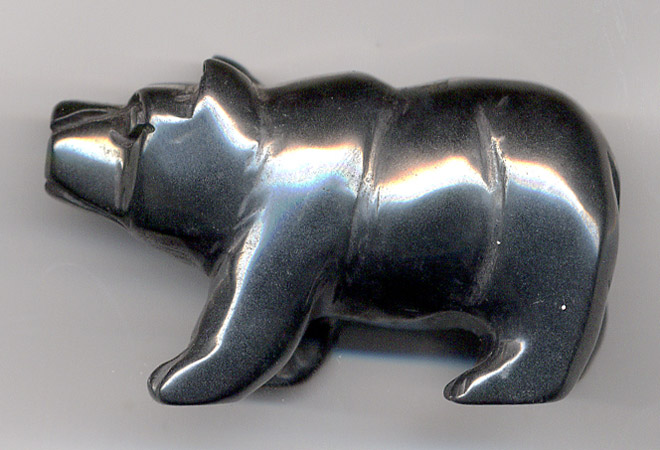
Hematite carving, 5 cm (2 in) long

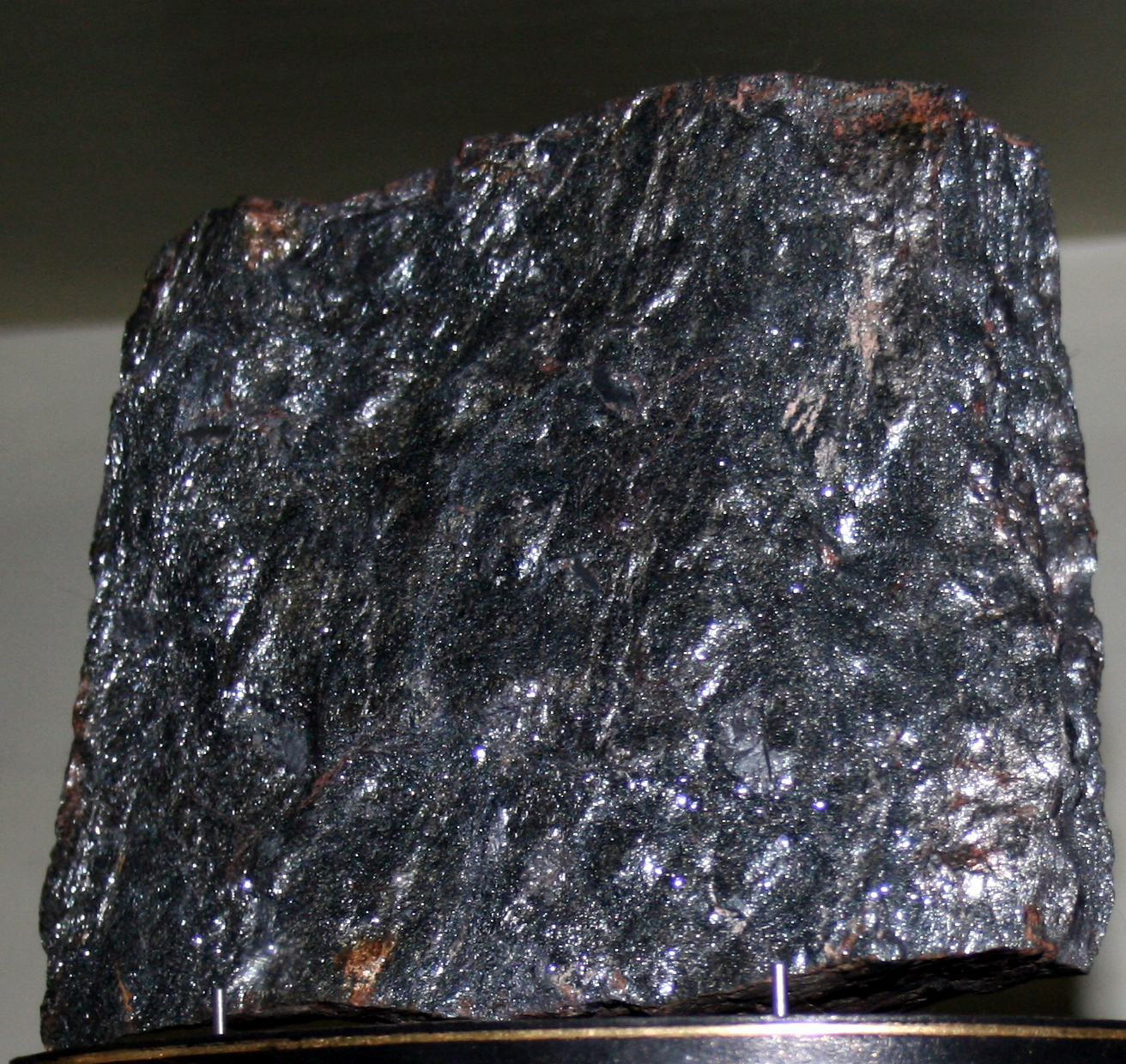
Specularite (specular hematite) variety of hematite, with fine grain shown

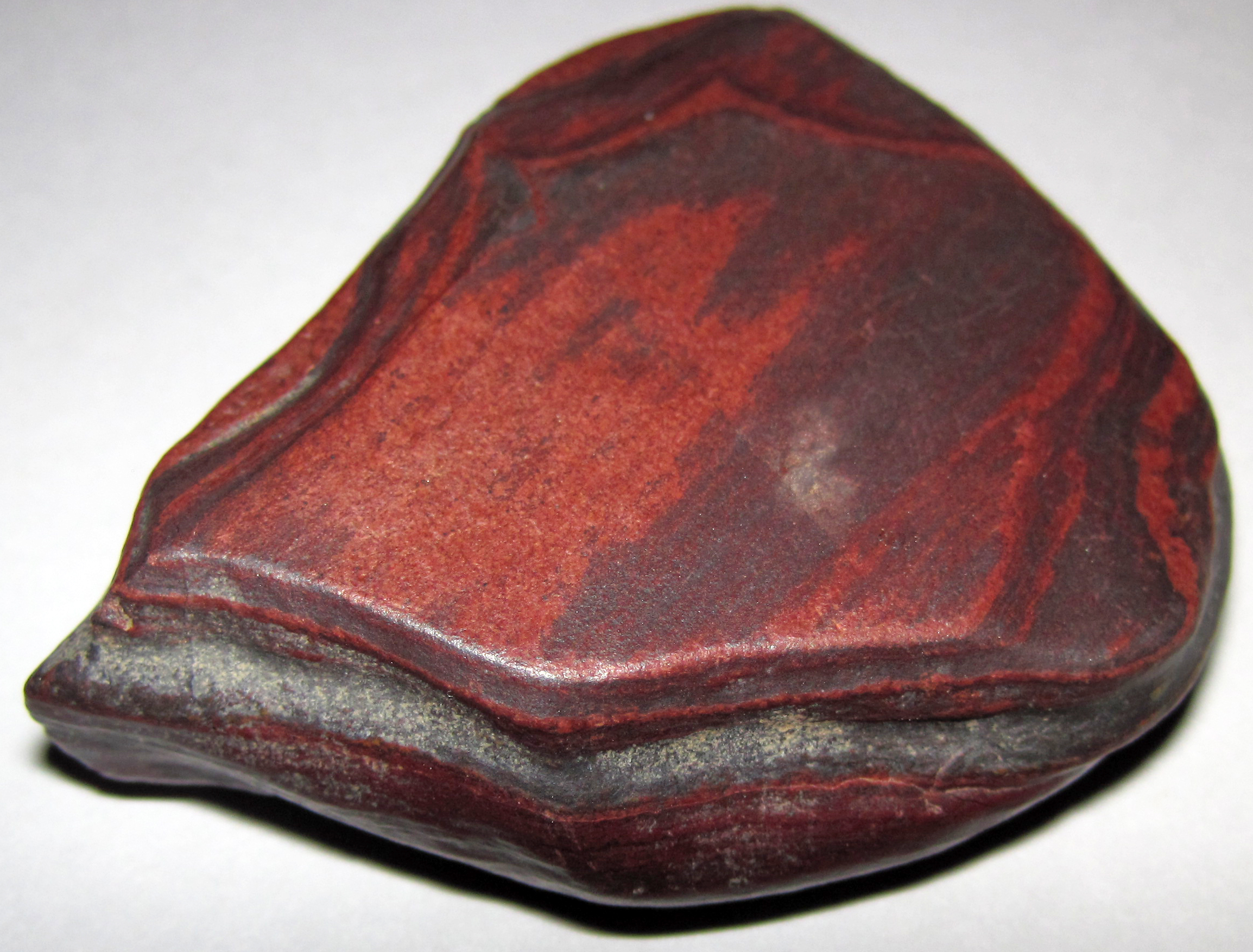
Red hematite from a banded iron formation in Wyoming

Hematite on Mars as found in form of "blueberries" (named by NASA)

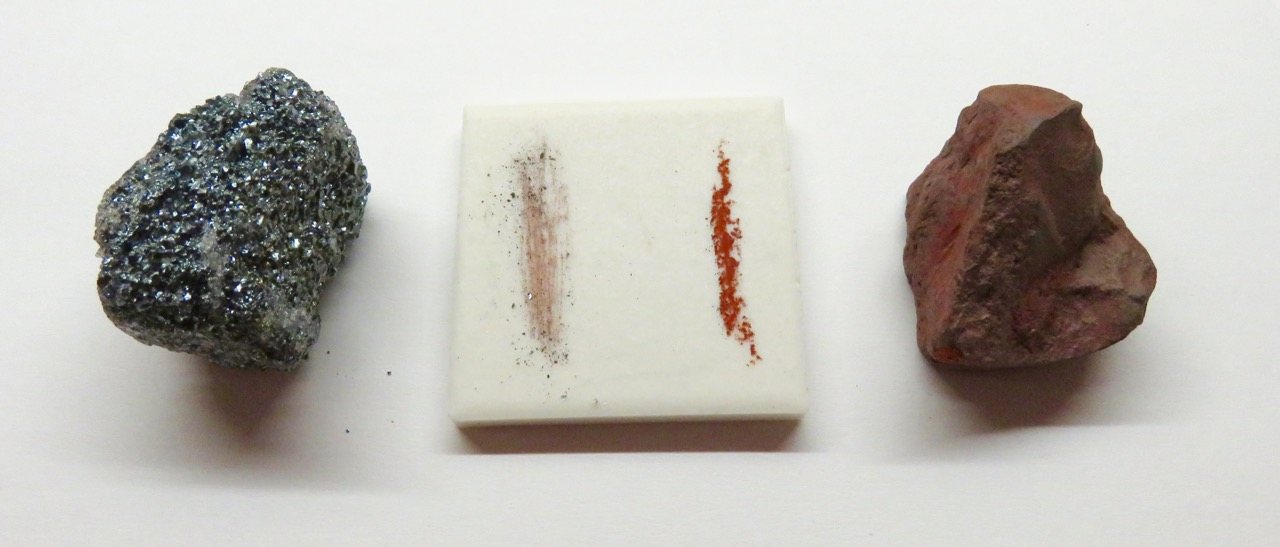
Streak plate, showing that hematite consistently leaves a rust-red streak

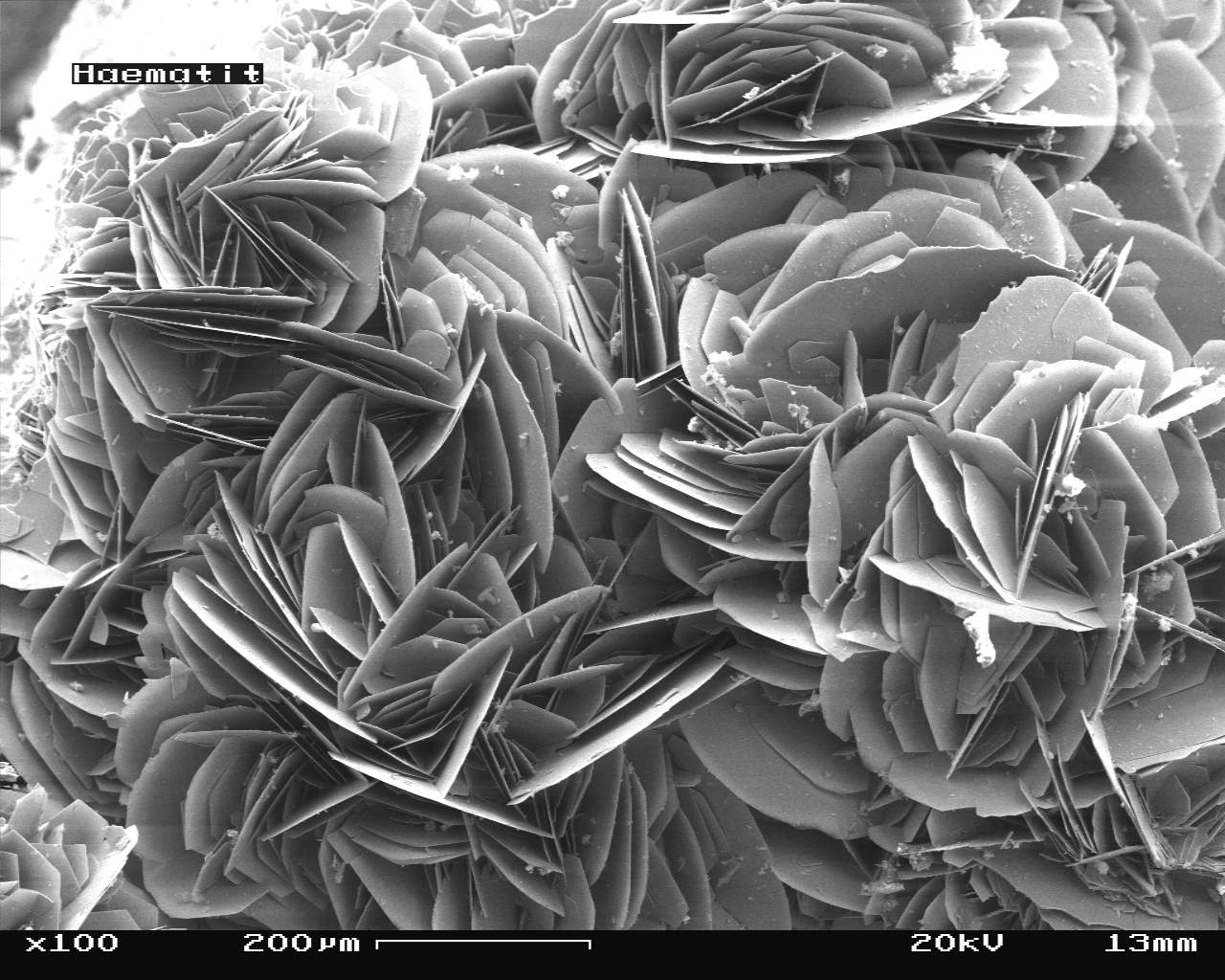
Hematite in scanning electron microscope, magnification 100x

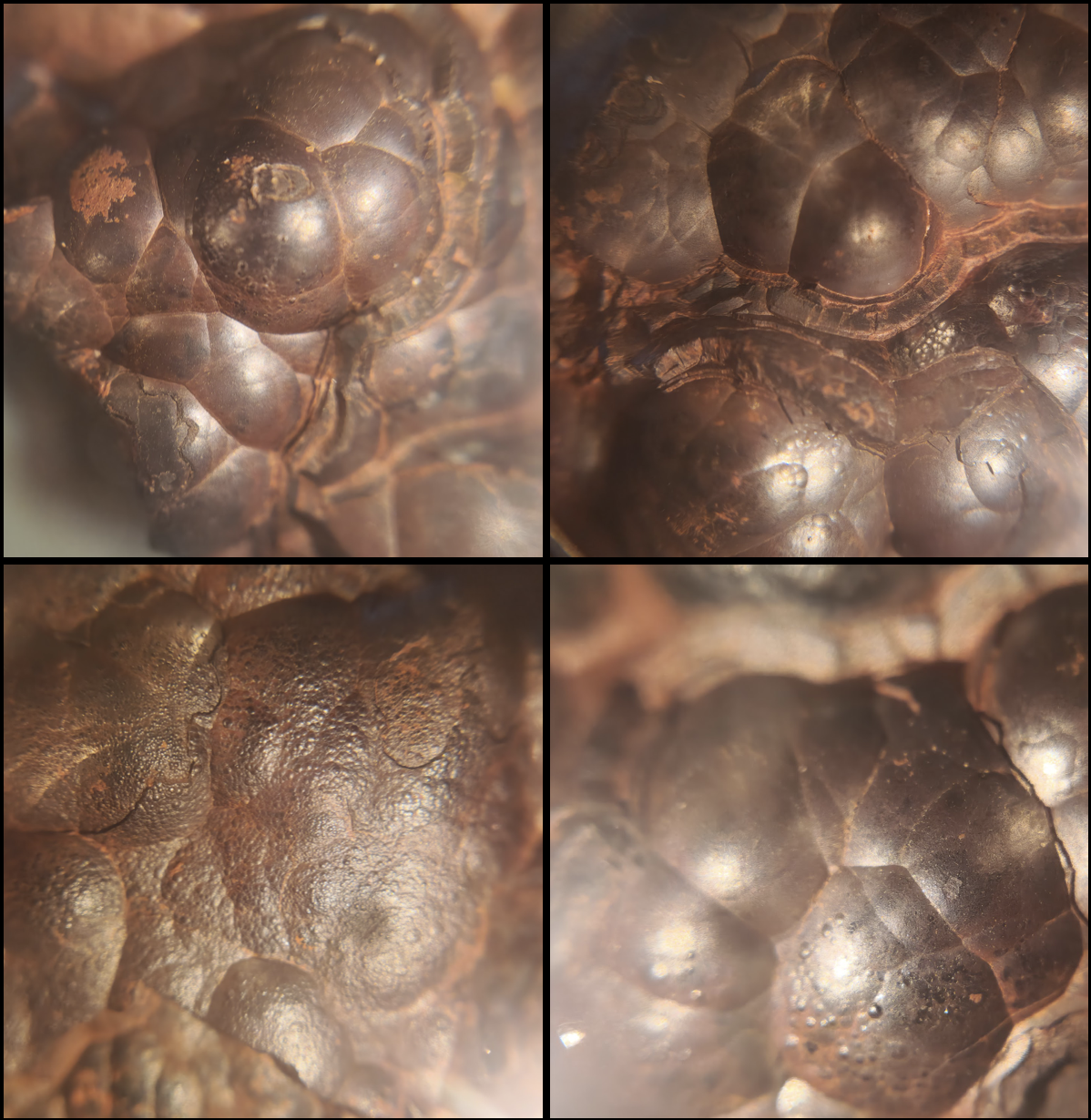
Cumbrian botryoidal hematite under hand-lens. Despite all being present on the same sample, the botryoids themselves vary widely in diameter.

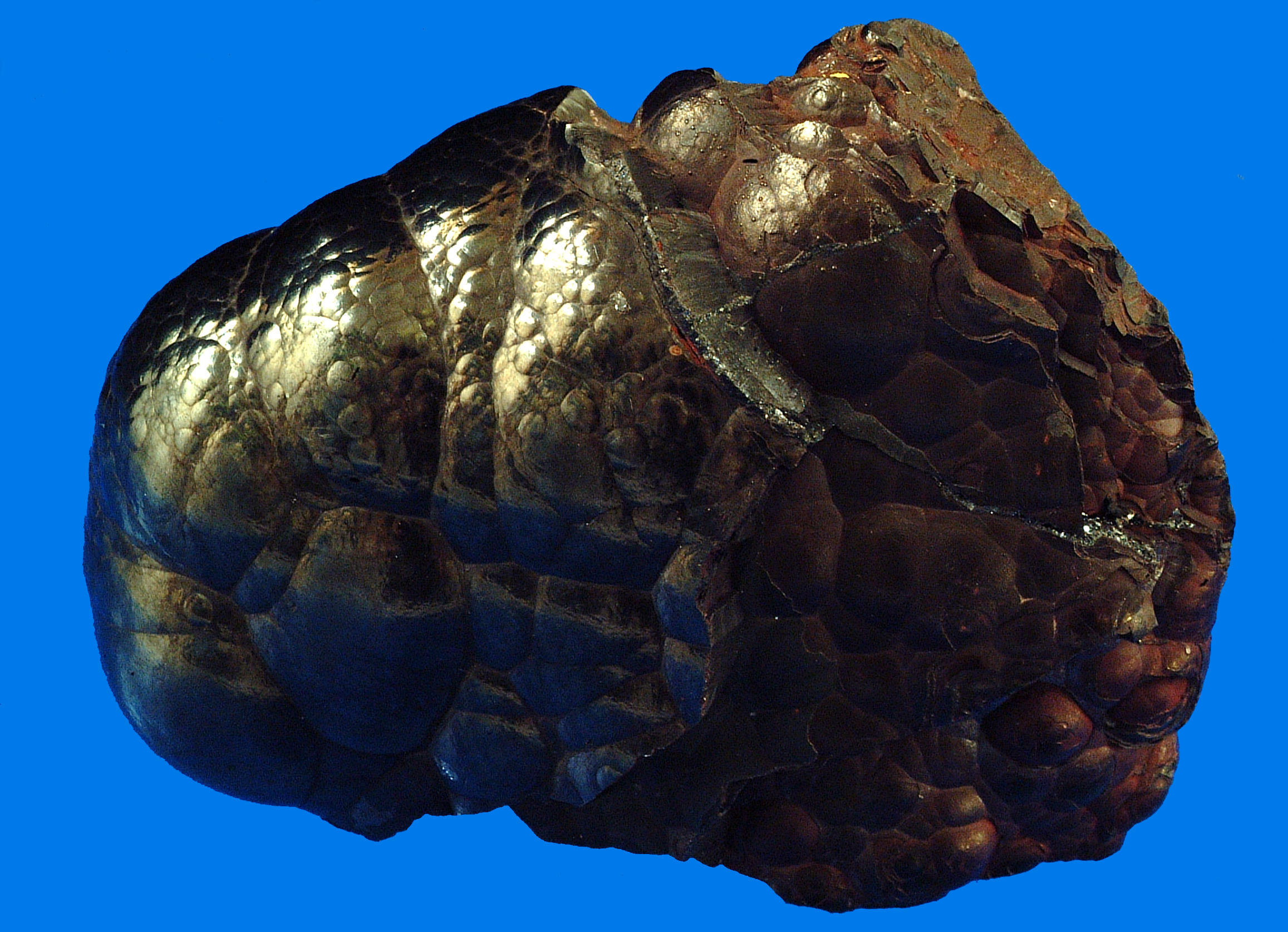
Hematite kidney ore

== See also ==
- Mill scale
- Mineral redox buffer
- Wüstite
