= Magnetation (iron ore) =

Magnetation is the processing of iron ore tailings, the waste product of iron ore mines, to recover hematite. Crushed mine tailings are mixed with water to create a slurry; the slurry is then pumped through magnetic separation chambers to extract hematite. Commercial interest in this process stems from the possibility of extracting additional iron from tailings supplied by existing mines, increasing their yield.

The process is only economical at high ore prices, while low ones lead to companies operating it, such as US Magnetation and ERP Iron Ore, into bankruptcy.
