= Hematine =

Artificial magnetic material

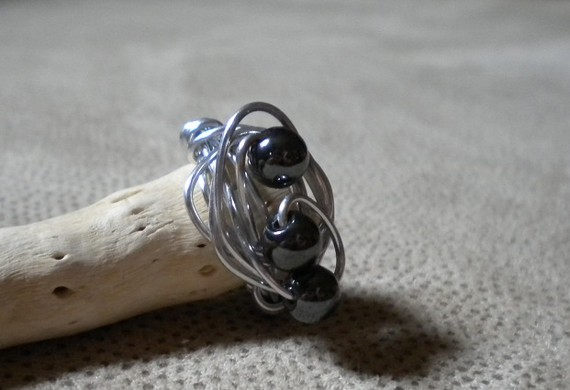
Hematine ring

Hematine (also magnetic hematite, hemalyke or hemalike) is an artificial magnetic material. Hematine is widely used in jewelry.

Although it is claimed by many that it is made from ground hematite or iron oxide mixed with a resin, analysis (of one object) has demonstrated it to be an entirely artificial compound, a barium-strontium ferrite ((Ba,Sr)Fe_{12}O_{19}).
