= Spin canting =

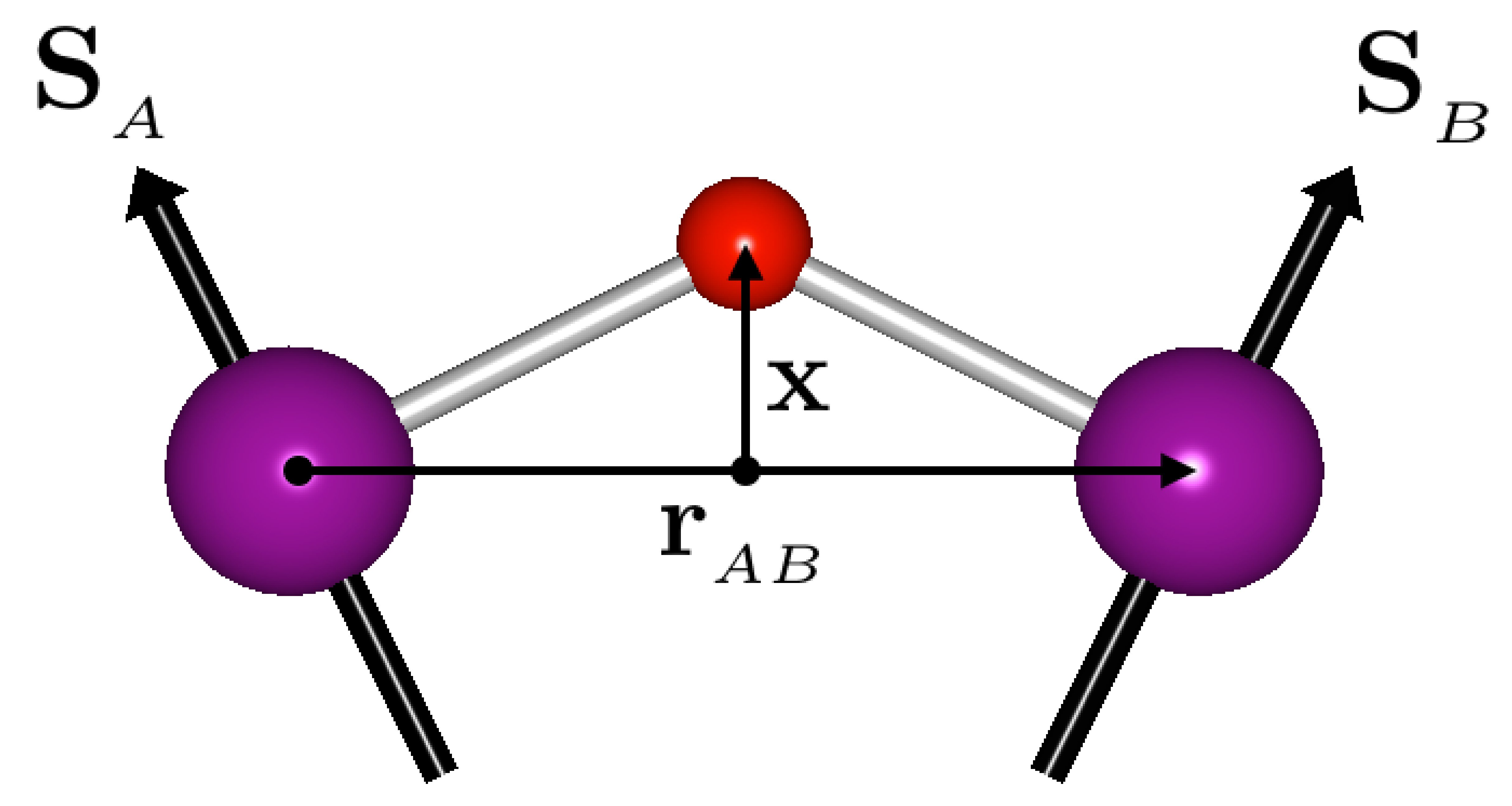
Antisymmetric exchange would align spins perpendicular to each other

Some antiferromagnetic materials exhibit a non-zero magnetic moment at a temperature near absolute zero. This effect is ascribed to spin canting, a phenomenon through which spins are tilted by a small angle about their axis rather than being exactly co-parallel.

Spin canting is due to two factors contrasting each other: isotropic exchange would align the spins exactly antiparallel, while antisymmetric exchange arising from relativistic effects (spin–orbit coupling) would align the spins at 90° to each other. The net result is a small perturbation, the extent of which depends on the relative strength of these effects.

This effect is observable in many materials such as hematite.
