= Praseodymium sesquicarbide =

Names
- Other names Dipraseodymium tricarbide

Identifiers
CAS Number	12127-58-1
3D model (JSmol)	Interactive image
- InChI: InChI=1S/3C2.4Pr/c3*1-2;;;;/q3*-4;4*+3 Key: YRNCAFWXVJIUBF-UHFFFAOYSA-N
- SMILES: [Pr+3].[Pr+3].[Pr+3].[Pr+3].[C-2][C-2].[C-2][C-2].[C-2][C-2]

Properties
Chemical formula	Pr_{2}C_{3}
Molar mass	317.85 g/mol

Structure
Crystal structure	Cubic, plutonium sesquicarbide type
Space group	I4̅3d, No. 220
Lattice constant	a = 0.8607 nm
Formula units (Z)	8
- Except where otherwise noted, data are given for materials in their standard state (at 25 °C [77 °F], 100 kPa). Infobox references

Praseodymium sesquicarbide is an inorganic compound of praseodymium and carbon with the formula Pr_{2}C_{3}. It is a rare-earth sesquicarbide with the cubic Pu_{2}C_{3} structure type and becomes antiferromagnetic below about 8 K.

== Preparation ==
Praseodymium sesquicarbide can be prepared by heating praseodymium and carbon at high temperature:

2 Pr + 3 C → Pr_{2}C_{3}

The phase forms peritectically in the Pr–C system rather than melting congruently. Phase-diagram assessments place its decomposition/peritectic temperature at approximately 1545–1560 °C.

== Properties ==
=== Crystal structure ===
Pr_{2}C_{3} crystallizes in the cubic crystal system, space group I4̅3d (No. 220), with the Pu_{2}C_{3} structure type and eight formula units per unit cell. The lattice parameter varies with carbon content across the homogeneity range. Spedding et al. reported a = 8.5731 Å on the praseodymium-rich side and a = 8.6072 Å on the carbon-rich side. The corresponding calculated density at the carbon-rich composition is about 6.62 g/cm^{3}. The structure contains discrete C_{2} units. Neutron diffraction gave a C–C distance of about 1.239 Å in Pr_{2}C_{3}, intermediate between that of CaC_{2} and the longer C–C distances found in many rare-earth dicarbides. Paramagnetic neutron scattering indicates that praseodymium is essentially trivalent in Pr_{2}C_{3}.

=== Phase stability ===
Pr_{2}C_{3} has a substantial homogeneity range rather than being restricted to exact 40 at.% praseodymium / 60 at.% carbon stoichiometry. Phase-diagram assessments place the stable composition range at approximately 55–60 at.% carbon.

It decomposes peritectically at about 1550 °C to liquid and another carbide phase.

=== Magnetic properties ===
Pr_{2}C_{3} orders antiferromagnetically below approximately 8 K. Neutron diffraction gives a Néel temperature of about 8 K and an ordered moment of approximately 1.3 μ_{B} per Pr atom, only about 41% of the free-ion value. The reduced moment was attributed to a strong crystal-field effect. The magnetic structure is the same general type found in Nd_{2}C_{3}, Tb_{2}C_{3} and Dy_{2}C_{3}. In the uniaxial model, two sets of body-diagonal praseodymium chains order antiferromagnetically while the other two remain magnetically disordered. The antiferromagnetic arrangement was reported to remain unchanged in applied fields up to 21 kOe.
