= Morin transition =

Magnetic phase transition in α-Fe_{2}O_{3} hematite

The Morin transition (also known as a spin-flop transition) is a magnetic phase transition in α-Fe_{2}O_{3} hematite where the antiferromagnetic ordering is reorganized from being aligned perpendicular to the c-axis to being aligned parallel to the c-axis below T_{M}.

T_{M} = 260 K for Fe^{3+} in α-Fe_{2}O_{3}.

A change in magnetic properties takes place at the Morin transition temperature.

== See also ==
- Verwey transition – Low-temperature phase transition in magnetite
- Ferromagnetism – Mechanism by which materials form into and are attracted to magnets
- Antiferromagnetism – Regular pattern of magnetic moment ordering
- Paramagnetism – Weak, attractive magnetism possessed by most elements and some compounds
- Néel temperature – Temperature above which magnetic properties change
