= Caesium sesquioxide =

Identifiers
3D model (JSmol)	Interactive image
PubChem CID	157422808
- InChI: InChI=1S/4Cs.2HO2.O2/c;;;;3*1-2/h;;;;2*1H;/q4*+1;;;-2/p-2 Key: CBAPCGFDLAJQPQ-UHFFFAOYSA-L
- SMILES: [Cs+].[Cs+].[Cs+].[Cs+].[O-][O].[O-][O].[O-][O-]

Properties
Chemical formula	Cs_{4}O_{6}
Molar mass	627.616 g·mol^{−1}
Appearance	black powder

Structure
Crystal structure	Pu_{2}C_{3} structure type (body-centered cubic)
Space group	I4̅3d (no. 220)
Lattice constant	a = 984.6 pm

Related compounds
Other cations	Rubidium sesquioxide
Related caesium oxides	Caesium suboxides; Caesium monoxide; Caesium peroxide; Caesium superoxide; Caesium ozonide
- Except where otherwise noted, data are given for materials in their standard state (at 25 °C [77 °F], 100 kPa). Infobox references

Caesium sesquioxide is a chemical compound with the formula Cs_{2}O_{3} or more accurately Cs_{4}O_{6}. It is an oxide of caesium containing oxygen in different oxidation states. It consists of caesium cations Cs^{+}, superoxide anions O^{−}_{2} and peroxide anions O^{2−}_{2}. Caesium in this compound has an oxidation state of +1, while oxygen in superoxide has an oxidation state of −1/2 and oxygen in peroxide has an oxidation state of −1. This compound has a structural formula of (Cs^{+})_{4}(O^{−}_{2})_{2}(O^{2−}_{2}). Compared to the other caesium oxides, this phase is less well studied, but has been long present in the literature.

== Properties ==
The compound is often studied as an example of a Verwey type charge ordering transition at low temperatures. There were some theoretical suggestions that Cs_{4}O_{6} would be a ferromagnetic half metal, but along with the closely related rubidium sesquioxide, experimental results found a magnetically frustrated system. Below about 200 K, the structure changes to tetragonal symmetry. Electron paramagnetic resonance and nuclear magnetic resonance measurements show a complicated low temperature magnetic behavior that depends on the orientation of the oxygen dimers and superexchange through the caesium atoms.

== Preparation ==
It can be created by thermal decomposition of caesium superoxide at 290 °C.

4 CsO_{2} → Cs_{4}O_{6} + O_{2}
