= Uranium carbide =

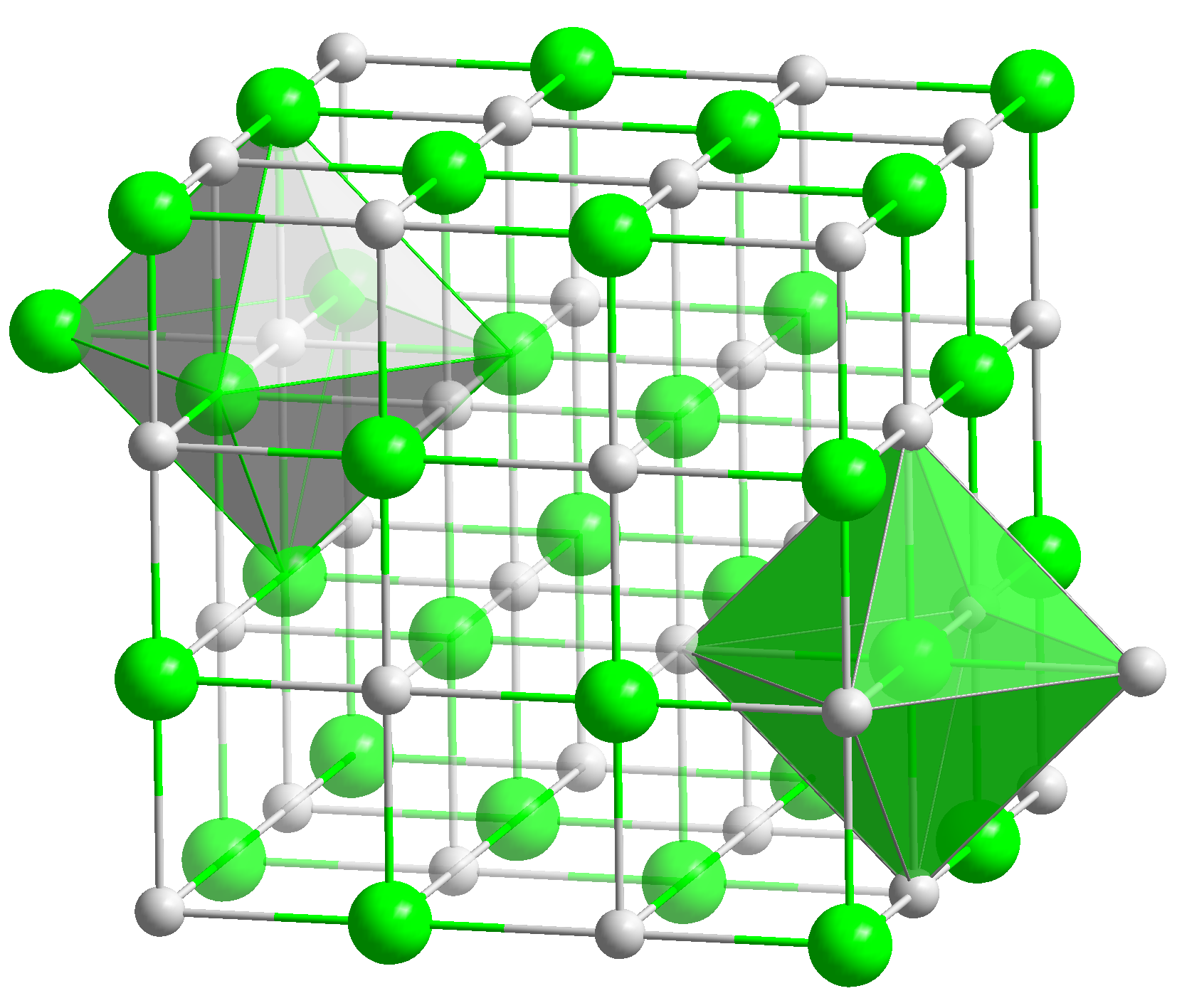
- Uranium carbide

Names
- IUPAC name Uranium carbide

Identifiers
CAS Number	UC: 12070-09-6; U_{2}C_{3}: 12076-62-9; UC_{2}: 12071-33-9
3D model (JSmol)	UC: Interactive image
ChemSpider	UC: 26947865
PubChem CID	UC: 166603 (wrong formula)
CompTox Dashboard (EPA)	UC: DTXSID80923541
- InChI: InChI=1S/C.U Key: HQMIBHMHKRSUCY-UHFFFAOYSA-N
- SMILES: UC: [U].[C]

Properties
Chemical formula	UC
Molar mass	250.04 g/mol
Density	13.63 g/cm^{3}
Melting point	2,350 °C (4,260 °F; 2,620 K)

Structure
Crystal structure	cubic, cF8
Space group	Fm3̅m, No. 225
- Except where otherwise noted, data are given for materials in their standard state (at 25 °C [77 °F], 100 kPa). verify (what is ?) Infobox references

A hollow cylinder of uranium carbide

Uranium carbide, a carbide of uranium, is a hard refractory ceramic material. It comes in several stoichiometries (x differs in UC_{x}), such as uranium methanide (UC, CAS number 12070-09-6), uranium sesquicarbide (U_{2}C_{3}, CAS number 12076-62-9), and uranium acetylide (UC_{2}, CAS number 12071-33-9).

Like uranium dioxide and some other uranium compounds, uranium carbide can be used as a nuclear fuel for nuclear reactors, usually in the form of pellets or tablets. Uranium carbide fuel was used in late designs of nuclear thermal rockets.

Uranium carbide pellets are used as fuel kernels for the US version of pebble bed reactors.

As nuclear fuel, uranium carbide can be used either on its own, or mixed with plutonium carbide (PuC and Pu_{2}C_{3}). The mixture is also labeled as uranium-plutonium carbide ( (U,Pu)C ).

Uranium carbide is also a popular target material for particle accelerators.

Ammonia synthesis from nitrogen and hydrogen is sometimes accomplished in the presence of uranium carbide acting as a catalyst.

== See also ==
- Uranium boride
- Thorium carbide
