= Praseodymium dicarbide =

Names
- Other names Praseodymium carbide

Identifiers
| CAS Number | 12071-25-9 |
| 3D model (JSmol) | Interactive image |
- SMILES: [C-]#[C].[Pr]

Properties
| Chemical formula | PrC_{2} |
| Molar mass | 164.93 g/mol |
| Appearance | Yellow crystalline solid |
| Density | 5.10 g/cm^{3} |
| Melting point | 2320 °C |

Structure
| Crystal structure | Tetragonal, calcium carbide type |
| Space group | I4/mmm, No. 139 |
| Lattice constant | a = 0.38517 nm, c = 0.64337 nm |
| Formula units (Z) | 2 |
- Except where otherwise noted, data are given for materials in their standard state (at 25 °C [77 °F], 100 kPa). Infobox references

Praseodymium dicarbide is an inorganic compound of praseodymium and carbon with the formula PrC_{2}. It is a yellow crystalline rare-earth dicarbide and adopts the tetragonal calcium carbide structure type at room temperature. At high temperature it transforms to a cubic phase and has a narrow range of non-stoichiometry.

== Preparation ==
Praseodymium dicarbide can be prepared by direct reaction of praseodymium with carbon at very high temperature:

Pr + 2 C → PrC_{2}

Older preparations used electric-furnace heating at temperatures around 2300 °C, sometimes under hydrogen or inert atmosphere.

== Properties ==
=== Crystal structure ===
At room temperature, PrC_{2} crystallizes in the tetragonal crystal system, space group I4/mmm (No. 139), with the CaC_{2} structure type. Reported lattice parameters are a = 3.8517 Å and c = 6.4337 Å, with two formula units per unit cell. As in other rare-earth dicarbides, the carbon atoms occur as discrete C_{2} units. The structure is commonly described in an acetylide-like picture containing Pr^{3+}, C_{2}^{2−} units and one conduction electron per formula unit.

=== High-temperature behaviour ===
PrC_{2} melts congruently at approximately 2320 °C. On heating, the tetragonal structure transforms to a cubic phase of space group Fm3̅m. Phase-diagram assessments place this transformation near 1130–1150 °C. Above about 1000 °C, PrC_{2} has a narrow homogeneity range of roughly 1–2 at.% carbon rather than existing only at exact stoichiometry. The high-temperature cubic phase is related to the orientationally disordered cubic forms of other rare-earth dicarbides, in which the C_{2} groups are no longer ordered as in the low-temperature tetragonal structure.

=== Magnetic and electrical properties ===
PrC_{2} is metallic and displays unusual low-temperature magnetic behaviour. Neutron-diffraction work found antiferromagnetic ordering near 15 ± 2 K. Electrical-resistivity measurements show a clear change in slope around 18 K, consistent with this transition. The same study found a ferromagnetic state below about 7 K in low applied fields. The discrepancy with the earlier antiferromagnetic result was interpreted as evidence for a low-field metamagnetic transition, occurring below approximately 700 Oe. This behaviour distinguishes PrC_{2} from many neighboring rare-earth dicarbides, which remain simply antiferromagnetic at low temperature.

=== Thermochemistry ===
A standard enthalpy of formation of approximately −94 kJ mol^{−1} has been tabulated for PrC_{2}.

== Reactions ==
Praseodymium dicarbide reacts with water, producing praseodymium hydroxide and hydrocarbons including acetylene and ethane:

4 PrC_{2} + 12 H_{2}O → 4 Pr(OH)_{3} + 3 C_{2}H_{2} + C_{2}H_{6}
