= Plutonium carbide =

Plutonium carbide comes in several stoichiometries (PuC and Pu_{2}C_{3}). It can be used as a nuclear fuel for nuclear reactors in conjunction with uranium carbide. The mixture is also labeled as uranium-plutonium carbide (UPuC).
