= Verwey transition =

Low-temperature phase transition in magnetite

The Verwey transition is a low-temperature phase transition in the mineral magnetite associated with changes in its magnetic, electrical, and thermal properties. It typically occurs near a temperature of 120 K but is observed at a range of temperatures between 80 and 125 K, although the spread is generally tight around 118–120 K in natural magnetites. Upon warming through the Verwey transition temperature (T_{V}), the magnetite crystal lattice changes from a monoclinic structure insulator to the metallic cubic inverse spinel structure that persists at room temperature. The phenomenon is named after Evert Verwey, a Dutch chemist who first recognized, in the 1940s, the connection between the structural transition and the changes in the physical properties of magnetite. This was the first metal-insulator transition to be found.

The Verwey transition is near in temperature, but distinct from, a magnetic isotropic point in magnetite, at which the first magnetocrystalline anisotropy constant changes sign from positive to negative.

The temperature and physical expression of the Verwey transition are highly sensitive to the stress state of magnetite and the stoichiometry. Non-stoichiometry in the form of metal cation substitution or partial oxidation can lower the transition temperature or suppress it entirely.

== See also ==
- Morin transition – Magnetic phase transition in α-Fe_{2}O_{3} hematite
