= Inorganic peroxide =

Inorganic compounds with peroxide (O2) ions/groups

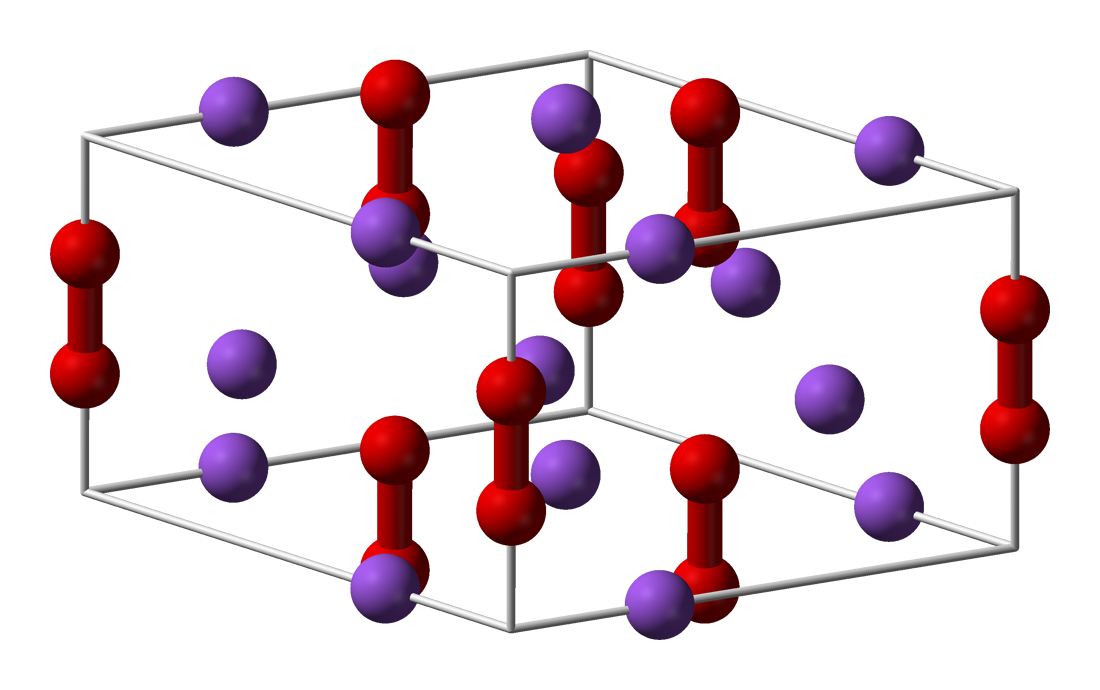
Unit cell of sodium peroxide Na_{2}O_{2}. The sodium ions are violet and the peroxide ions in red

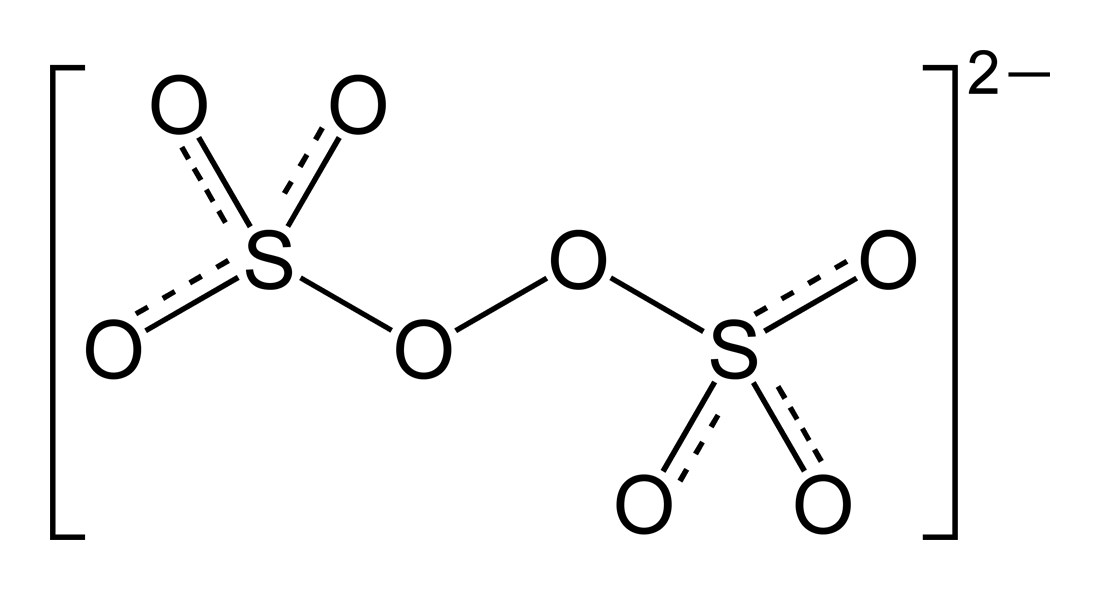
The structure of the peroxodisulfate anion

An inorganic peroxide is a peroxide of an inorganic compound. Metal peroxides are metal-containing peroxides with ionically- or covalently-bonded peroxide (O_{2}^{2−}) groups. This large family of compounds can be divided into ionic and covalent peroxide. The first class mostly contains the peroxides of the alkali and alkaline earth metals whereas the covalent peroxides are represented by such compounds as hydrogen peroxide and peroxymonosulfuric acid (H_{2}SO_{5}). In contrast to the purely ionic character of alkali metal peroxides, peroxides of transition metals have a more covalent character.

Main group peroxides are peroxide derivatives of the main group elements (many of which are metals). Many compounds of the main group elements form peroxides, and a few are of commercial significance.

== Bonding in O_{2}^{2−} ==
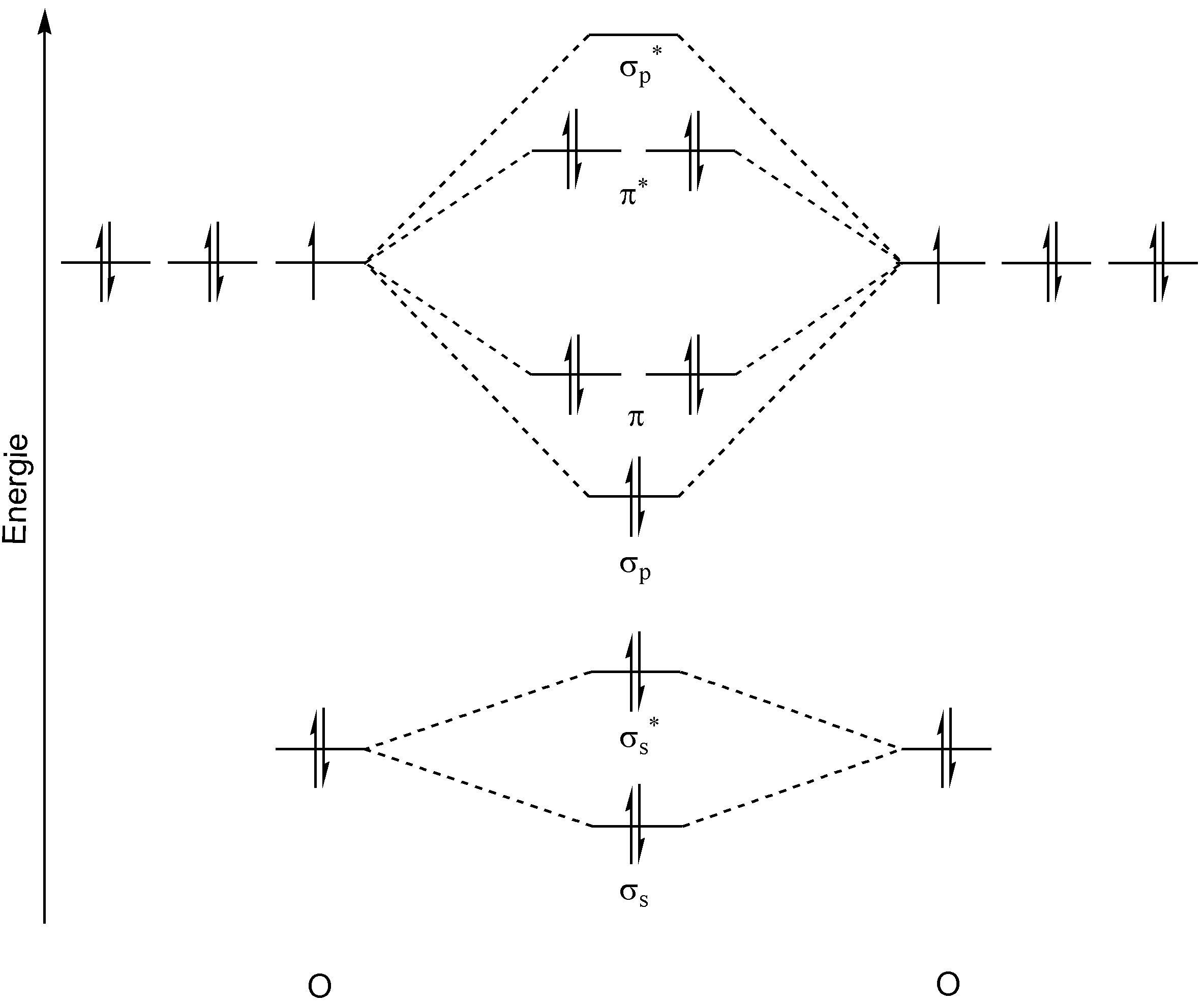
Molecular orbital diagram of the peroxide ion

The peroxide ion is composed of two oxygen atoms that are linked by a single bond. The molecular orbital diagram of the peroxide dianion predicts a doubly occupied antibonding π* orbital and a bond order of 1. The bond length is 149 pm, which is larger than in the ground state (triplet oxygen) of the oxygen molecule (^{3}O_{2}, 121 pm). This translates into the smaller force constant of the bond (2.8 N/cm vs. 11.4 N/cm for ^{3}O_{2}) and the lower frequency of the molecular vibration (770 cm^{−1} vs. 1555 cm^{−1} for ^{3}O_{2}).

The peroxide ion can be compared with superoxide O_{2}^{−}, which is a radical, and dioxygen, a diradical.

== Preparation of peroxide salts ==
Most alkali metal peroxides can be synthesized directly by oxygenation of the elements. Lithium peroxide is formed upon treating lithium hydroxide with hydrogen peroxide:

2 LiOH + H_{2}O_{2} → Li_{2}O_{2} + 2 H_{2}O

Barium peroxide (BaO_{2}) is prepared by oxygenation of barium oxide (BaO) at elevated temperature and pressure.

2 BaO + O_{2}(air) 2 BaO_{2}

Barium peroxide was once used to produce pure oxygen from air. This process relies on the temperature-dependent chemical equilibrium between barium oxide and peroxide: the reaction of barium oxide with air at 500 °C results in barium peroxide, which upon heating to above 700 °C decomposes back to barium oxide with release pure oxygen. The lighter alkaline earth metals calcium, magnesium and strontium also form peroxides, which are used commercially as oxygen sources or oxidizers.

=== Reaction of peroxide salts ===
Few reactions are generally formulated for peroxide salt. In excess of dilute acids or water, they release hydrogen peroxide.

Na_{2}O_{2} + 2 HCl → 2 NaCl + H_{2}O_{2}

Upon heating, the reaction with water leads to the release of oxygen. Upon exposure to air, alkali metal peroxides absorb CO_{2} to give peroxycarbonates.

== Transition metal peroxides ==
Binary transition metal peroxides, compounds containing only metal cations and peroxide anions, are rare. Metal dioxides, on the other hand, are pervasive, such as MnO_{2} and rutile (TiO_{2}). Well characterized examples of transition metal peroxides include the d^{10} metal cations: zinc peroxide (ZnO_{2}), two polymorphs (both explosive) of mercury peroxide (HgO_{2}), and cadmium peroxide (CdO_{2}).

Peroxide is a common ligand in metal complexes. Within the area of transition metal dioxygen complexes, O_{2}^{2−} functions as a bidentate ligand. Many transition metal dioxygen complexes are best described as adducts of peroxide. Some complexes mix oxide and peroxide ligands: for example, chromium(VI) oxide peroxide (Cr(O_{2})_{2}O). Others have only peroxide ligands. These transition metal tetraperoxide complexes include the red peroxomolybdate Mo(O_{2})_{4}^{2−}. The reaction of hydrogen peroxide with aqueous titanium(IV) gives a brightly orange-red colored peroxy complex that is a useful test for titanium as well as hydrogen peroxide.

== Applications ==
Many inorganic peroxides are used for bleaching textiles and paper and as a bleaching additive to detergents and cleaning products. The increasing environmental concerns resulted in the preference of peroxides over chlorine-based compounds and a sharp increase in the peroxide production. The past use of perborates as additives to detergents and cleaning products has been largely replaced by percarbonates. The use of peroxide compounds in detergents is often reflected in their trade names; for example, Persil is a combination of the words perborate and silicate.

Some peroxide salts release oxygen upon reaction with carbon dioxide. This reaction is used in generation of oxygen from exhaled carbon dioxide on submarines and spaceships. Sodium or lithium peroxides are preferred in space applications because of their lower molar mass and therefore higher oxygen yield per unit weight.

2 Na_{2}O_{2} + 2 CO_{2} → 2 Na_{2}CO_{3} + O_{2}

Alkali metal peroxides can be used for the synthesis of organic peroxides. One example is the conversion of benzoyl chloride with sodium peroxide to dibenzoyl peroxide.

== Examples ==
With thousands of tons/year being produced annually, the peroxydisulfates, S_{2}O_{8}^{2−}, are preeminent members of this class. These salts serve as initiators for polymerization of acrylates and styrene.

At one time, sodium perborate was used in detergents. It has since largely been replaced by sodium carbonate sesquiperhydrate.

Many peroxides are not commercially valuable but are of academic interest. One example is bis(trimethylsilyl) peroxide (Me_{3}SiOOSiMe_{3}). Phosphorus oxides form a number of peroxides, e.g. "P_{2}O_{6}".

== History ==
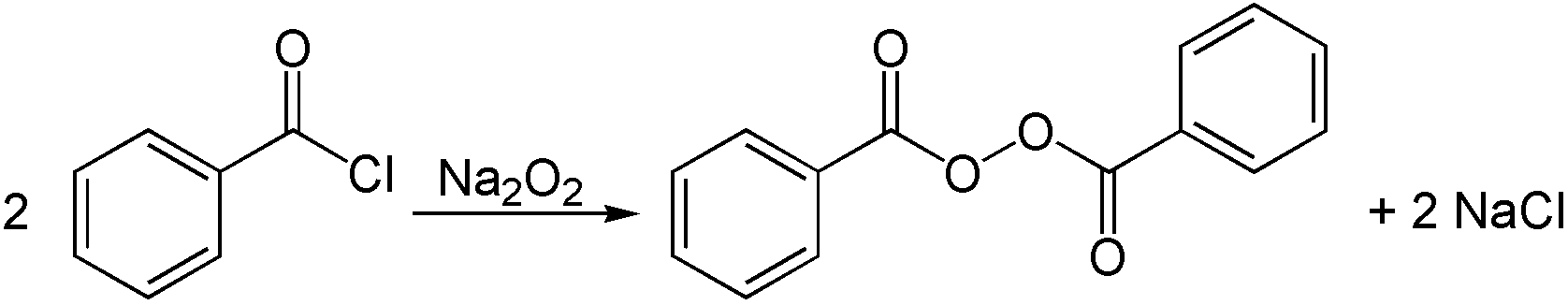
Synthesis of dibenzoyl

Alexander von Humboldt synthesized barium peroxide in 1799 as a byproduct of his attempts to decompose air.

Nineteen years later Louis Jacques Thénard recognized that this compound could be used for the preparation of hydrogen peroxide. Thénard and Joseph Louis Gay-Lussac synthesized sodium peroxide in 1811. The bleaching effect of peroxides and their salts on natural dyes became known around that time, but early attempts of industrial production of peroxides failed, and the first plant producing hydrogen peroxide was built in 1873 in Berlin.

== See also ==
- Ozonide, O_{3}^{−}
- Superoxide, O_{2}^{−}
- Hydrogen peroxide
