= Oxide =

Chemical compound with an oxygen atom

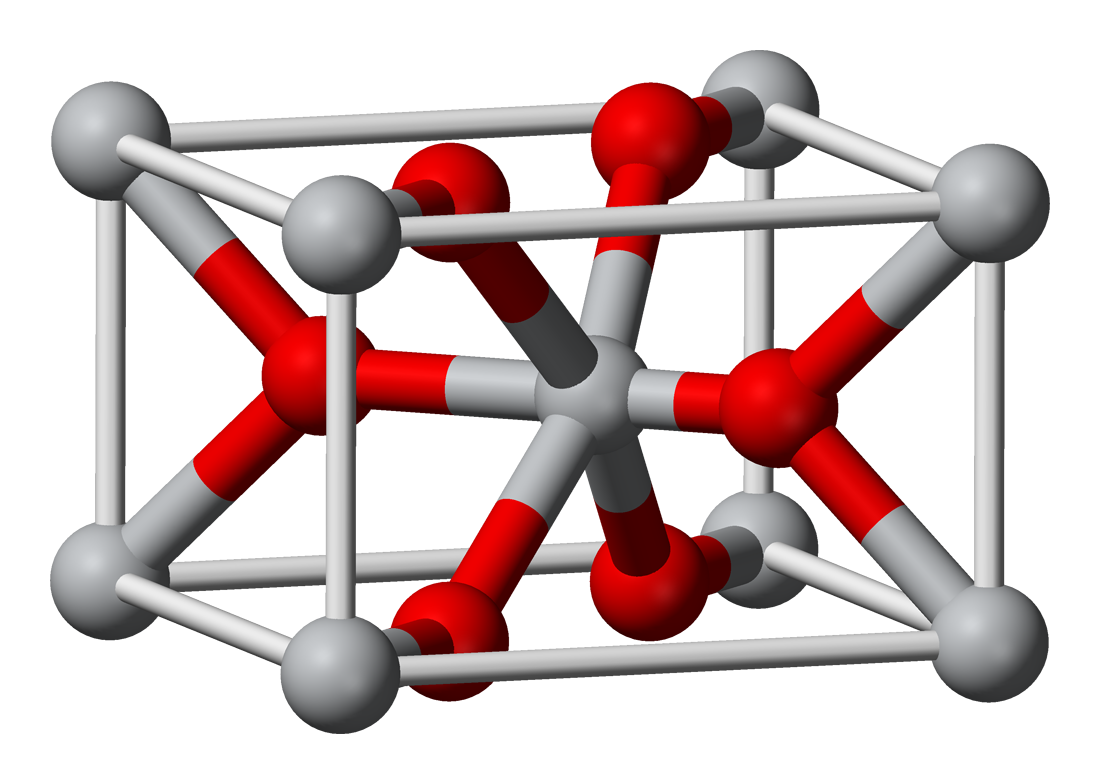
The unit cell of rutile, an important oxide of titanium. Ti(IV) centers are grey; oxygen centers are red. Notice that oxygen forms three bonds to titanium and titanium forms six bonds to oxygen.

An oxide (/ˈɒksaɪd/) is a chemical compound containing at least one oxygen atom and one other element in its chemical formula. "Oxide" itself is the dianion (anion bearing a net charge of −2) of oxygen, an O^{2−} ion with in the oxidation state of −2. Most of the Earth's crust consists of oxides. Even materials considered pure elements often develop an oxide coating. For example, aluminium foil develops a thin skin of Al_{2}O_{3} (called a passivation layer) that protects the foil from further oxidation.

== Stoichiometry ==
Oxides are extraordinarily diverse in terms of stoichiometries (the measurable relationship between reactants and chemical equations of an equation or reaction) and in terms of the structures of each stoichiometry. Most elements form oxides of more than one stoichiometry. A well known example is carbon monoxide and carbon dioxide. This applies to binary oxides, that is, compounds containing only oxide and another element. Far more common than binary oxides are oxides of more complex stoichiometries. Such complexity can arise by the introduction of other cations (a positively charged ion, i.e. one that would be attracted to the cathode in electrolysis) or other anions (a negatively charged ion). Iron silicate, Fe_{2}SiO_{4}, the mineral fayalite, is one of many examples of a ternary oxide. For many metal oxides, the possibilities of polymorphism and nonstoichiometry exist as well. The commercially important dioxides of titanium exists in three distinct structures, for example. Many metal oxides exist in various nonstoichiometric states. Many molecular oxides exist with diverse ligands as well.

For simplicity's sake, most of this article focuses on binary oxides.

== Formation ==
Oxides are associated with all elements except a few noble gases. The pathways for the formation of this diverse family of compounds are correspondingly numerous.

=== Metal oxides ===
Many metal oxides arise by decomposition of other metal compounds, e.g. carbonates, hydroxides, and nitrates. In the making of calcium oxide, calcium carbonate (limestone) breaks down upon heating, releasing carbon dioxide:

CaCO_{3} → CaO + CO_{2}

The reaction of elements with oxygen in air is a key step in corrosion relevant to the commercial use of iron especially. Almost all elements form oxides upon heating with oxygen atmosphere. For example, zinc powder will burn in air to give zinc oxide:

2 Zn + O_{2} → 2 ZnO

The production of metals from ores often involves the production of oxides by roasting (heating) metal sulfide minerals in air. In this way, MoS_{2} (molybdenite) is converted to molybdenum trioxide, the precursor to virtually all molybdenum compounds:

2 MoS_{2} + 7 O_{2} → 2 MoO_{3} + 4 SO_{2}

Noble metals (such as gold and platinum) are prized because they resist direct chemical combination with oxygen.

=== Non-metal oxides ===
Important and prevalent nonmetal oxides are carbon dioxide and carbon monoxide. These species form upon full or partial oxidation of carbon or hydrocarbons. With a deficiency of oxygen, the monoxide is produced:

2 CH_{4} + 3 O_{2} → 2 CO + 4 H_{2}O
2 C + O_{2} → 2 CO

With excess oxygen, the dioxide is the product, the pathway proceeds by the intermediacy of carbon monoxide:

CH_{4} + 2 O_{2} → CO_{2} + 2 H_{2}O
C + O_{2} → CO_{2}

Elemental nitrogen (N_{2}) is difficult to convert to oxides, but the combustion of ammonia gives nitric oxide, which further reacts with oxygen:

4 NH_{3} + 5 O_{2} → 4 NO + 6 H_{2}O
2 NO + O_{2} → 2 NO_{2}

These reactions are practiced in the production of nitric acid, a commodity chemical.

The chemical produced on the largest scale industrially is sulfuric acid. It is produced by the oxidation of sulfur to sulfur dioxide, which is separately oxidized to sulfur trioxide:

S + O_{2} → SO_{2}
2 SO_{2} + O_{2} → 2 SO_{3}

Finally the trioxide is converted to sulfuric acid by a hydration reaction:

SO_{3} + H_{2}O → H_{2}SO_{4}

== Structure ==
Oxides have a range of structures, from individual molecules to polymeric and crystalline structures. At standard conditions, oxides may range from solids to gases. Solid oxides of metals usually have polymeric structures at ambient conditions.

=== Molecular oxides ===
Some important gaseous oxides

Carbon dioxide is the main product of fossil fuel combustion.

Carbon monoxide is the product of the incomplete combustion of carbon-based fuels and a precursor to many useful chemicals.

Nitrogen dioxide is a problematic pollutant from internal combustion engines.

Sulfur dioxide, the principal oxide of sulfur, is emitted from volcanoes.

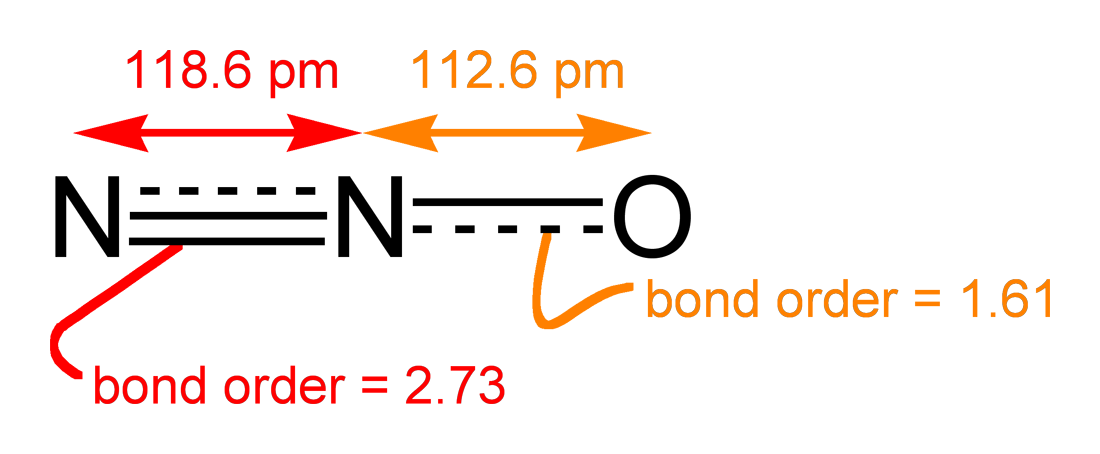
Nitrous oxide ("laughing gas") is a potent greenhouse gas produced by soil bacteria.

Although most metal oxides are crystalline solids, many non-metal oxides are molecules. Examples of molecular oxides are carbon dioxide and carbon monoxide. All simple oxides of nitrogen are molecular, e.g., NO, N_{2}O, NO_{2} and N_{2}O_{4}. Phosphorus pentoxide is a more complex molecular oxide with a deceptive name, the real formula being P_{4}O_{10}. Tetroxides are rare, with a few more common examples being ruthenium tetroxide, osmium tetroxide, and xenon tetroxide.

== Reactions ==
=== Reduction ===
Reduction of metal oxide to the metal is practiced on a large scale in the production of some metals. Many metal oxides convert to metals simply by heating (thermal decomposition). For example, silver oxide decomposes at 200 °C:

2 Ag_{2}O → 4 Ag + O_{2}

Most often, however, metal oxides are reduced by a chemical reagent. A common and cheap reducing agent is carbon in the form of coke. The most prominent example is that of iron ore smelting. Many reactions are involved, but the simplified equation is usually shown as:

2 Fe_{2}O_{3} + 3 C → 4 Fe + 3 CO_{2}

Some metal oxides dissolve in the presence of reducing agents, which can include organic compounds. Reductive dissolution of ferric oxides is integral to geochemical phenomena such as the iron cycle.

=== Hydrolysis and dissolution ===
Because the M–O bonds are typically strong, metal oxides tend to be insoluble in solvents, though they may be attacked by aqueous acids and bases.

Dissolution of oxides often gives oxyanions. Adding aqueous base to P_{4}O_{10} gives various phosphates. Adding aqueous base to MoO_{3} gives polyoxometalates. Similarly, Metal peroxide compounds, e.g. [K_{4}Ti(O_{2})_{4}], arise by reaction of the metal oxides with a alkaline solution of hydrogen peroxide.

Oxycations are somewhat rare, one examples being nitrosonium (NO^{+}). Some oxycations, e.g. vanadyl, are occasionally represented with abbreviated formula such as VO^{2+}. VO^{2+} is in fact an aquo complex [VO(H_{2}O)_{5}]^{2+}. Similarly uranyl (UO^{2+}_{2}) refers to hydrated cations. Related to the oxycations are the oxyhalides, e.g. vanadium oxytrichloride (VOCl_{3}).

== Nomenclature and formulas ==
The chemical formulas of the oxides of the chemical elements in their highest oxidation state are predictable and are derived from the number of valence electrons for that element. Even the chemical formula of O_{4}, tetraoxygen, is predictable as a group 16 element. One exception is copper, for which the highest oxidation state oxide is copper(II) oxide and not copper(I) oxide. Another exception is fluoride, which does not exist as one might expect—as F_{2}O_{7}—but as OF_{2}.

== See also ==
- Other oxygen ions: ozonide (O^{−}_{3}), superoxide (O^{−}_{2}), peroxide (O^{2−}_{2}) and dioxygenyl (O^{+}_{2}).
- Suboxide
- Oxohalide
- Oxyanion
- Complex oxide
- See Template:Oxides for a list of oxides.
- Salt
- Wet electron
