= Oxygen generating biomaterial =

Designed to release oxygen in biological environments

An oxygen generating biomaterial (OGB) is a material designed to produce, store and release oxygen within biological environments. These materials are investigated for various applications in the biomedical field, including tissue engineering, regenerative medicine and implants.

Oxygen plays a key role inside human body and it is essential for cellular metabolism and functionality. In physiological conditions it is delivered to all tissues and organs through the circulatory system. If the oxygen availability is insufficient, a condition known as hypoxia develops and may result in cellular dysfunction. Limited oxygen availability may ultimately lead to cell death via apoptosis and necrosis. In this context, oxygen generating biomaterials can provide localized oxygen supply and compensation for low oxygen availability. Currently, several approaches have been investigated to achieve these goals, including oxygen-releasing and oxygen-carrying materials.

== Oxygen supply mechanisms ==
Oxygen generating approaches can supply oxygen following different mechanisms. These mechanisms include oxygen-releasing compounds, such as inorganic peroxides and hydrogen peroxide-based systems, as well as oxygen-carrying materials, such as perfluorocarbons and hemoglobin-based carriers.

=== Oxygen-releasing materials ===
The oxygen-releasing materials include solid inorganic peroxide and hydrogen peroxide-based systems, which release oxygen rather than simply delivering it.

==== Solid inorganic peroxides ====
Solid inorganic peroxides are a family of compounds which include calcium peroxide ($\ce{CaO2}$), magnesium peroxide ($\ce{MgO2}$) and sodium percarbonate ($\ce{2 Na2CO3 . 3 H2O2}$). In aqueous environments these materials undergo hydrolytic dissolution.

An initial dissociation leads to the formation of hydrogen peroxide:

$\ce{CaO2 + 2H2O -> Ca(OH)2 + H2O2}$

This reaction is followed by the decomposition of hydrogen peroxide into oxygen:

$\ce{2H2O2 -> O2 + 2H2O}$

Solid inorganic peroxides present different solubility in water:

Solid peroxide	Solubility in water
Calcium peroxide	1.65 g/L at 20°C
Magnesium peroxide	0.086 g/L at 18°C
Sodium percarbonate	120 g/L at 20°C

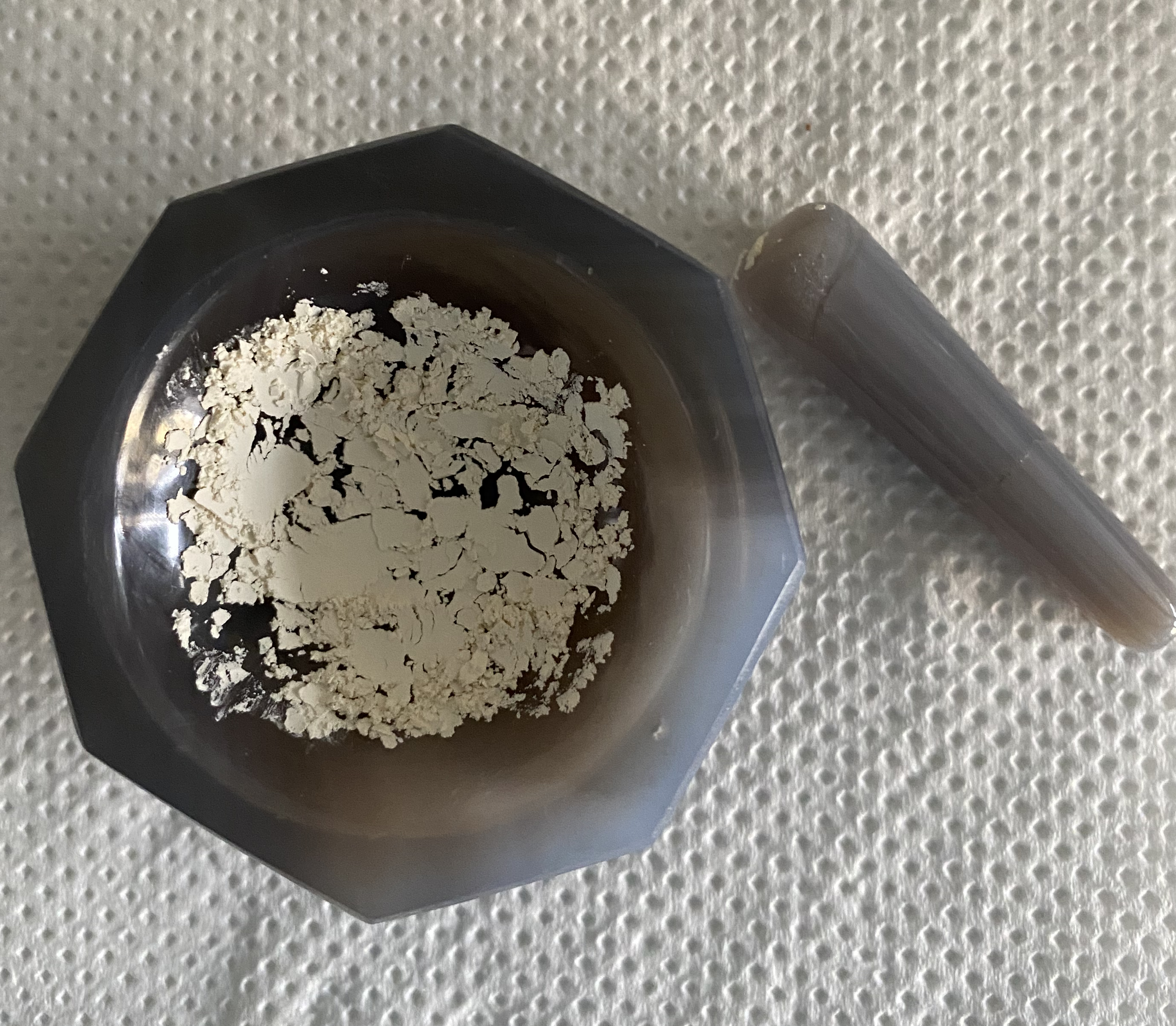
Calcium peroxide powder

The different inorganic peroxides exhibit distinct solubility and decomposition characteristics, which influence their oxygen release profiles.

Sodium percarbonate is highly soluble in water and facilitates the immediate release of oxygen, whereas calcium peroxide and magnesium peroxide are less soluble. Among these materials, calcium peroxide is frequently investigated in oxygen-generating biomaterials because it releases oxygen through hydrogen peroxide formation and has been incorporated into different biomaterial systems.

==== Hydrogen peroxide-based systems ====
Hydrogen peroxide-based systems use hydrogen peroxide ($\ce{H2O2}$) as a direct source of oxygen. In aqueous environments, $\ce{H2O2}$ decomposes into water and molecular oxygen according to the following reaction:

$\ce{2H2O2 -> O2 + 2H2O}$

This process can occur spontaneously or it can be accelerated by catalysts and enzymes (e.g. catalase). Hydrogen peroxide-based approaches have been investigated to provide a localised oxygen supply in biomedical applications.

=== Oxygen-carrying materials ===
==== Perfluorocarbons ====
Perfluorocarbons (PFCs) are organic compounds in which all the hydrogen atoms are replaced with fluorine. PFCs are chemically inert and have low polarizability. PFCs are capable of storing and releasing oxygen according to the oxygen partial pressure gradient between the PFCs and the surrounding environment. Oxygen molecules are stored by physical dissolution mediated by van der Waals forces.

==== Hemoglobin-based oxygen carriers ====
Hemoglobin-based oxygen carriers are investigated because hemoglobin is the primary natural $\ce{O2}$ carrier in the human body. However, it cannot be used independently due to its tendency to fragment into dimers and monomers outside of red blood cells (RBCs), leading to toxicity. To address this issue, a variety of synthetic alternatives to RBCs, mimicking the natural oxygen delivery of RBCs, have been introduced.

== Challenges and limitations ==
In biological environments, if oxygen availability is insufficient, optimal cellular survival and functionality cannot be achieved. In this context, oxygen-generating biomaterials can supply oxygen, addressing hypoxia-related issues and supporting cell viability, metabolism, and function. A major challenge reported for the development of oxygen-generating biomaterials is achieving controlled oxygen release in these biological environments. In fact, several studies report that an initial burst release of $\ce{O2}$ can be harmful to cells: if a large amount of oxygen is released abruptly and too quickly, it can lead to local oxidative stress and may ultimately cause cytotoxicity. Consequently, the amount and release rate of oxygen are crucial factors for a safe and effective use. For this reason, various biomaterial platforms are being investigated in order to control and modulate oxygen release in biomedical applications.

== Biomaterial platforms and applications ==
The delivery of oxygen-releasing and oxygen-carrying materials can be achieved through different strategies. The selection of the biomaterials and approaches to incorporate them has a significant influence on the oxygen release kinetics and consequently on the functionality. Overall, the application of oxygen generating biomaterials is dependent on the chosen platform and its oxygen release profile, which affect their suitability for specific biomedical challenges.

=== Hydrogels ===
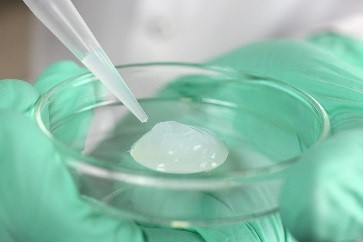
A sample of hydrogel based on cellulose

Hydrogels are three-dimensional networks with high water content and soft structure. Due to their structural characteristics and tunable properties, they represent suitable candidates to encapsulate therapeutic agents, such as oxygen generating materials. Hydrogels comprise both natural (e.g. alginate, gelatin, collagen, hyaluronic acid) and synthetic (e.g. polyethylene glycol) materials. Their minimally invasive administration and ability to mimic the extracellular matrix have contributed to their use in biomedical applications. Hydrogels are used as matrices for the incorporation of oxygen-releasing compounds and oxygen carriers. The high water content and permeability of these materials facilitate nutrients transport within the material. Oxygen generating hydrogels have been investigated for applications in wound healing, tissue engineering and also to facilitate angiogenesis.

=== Scaffolds ===
Scaffolds are three-dimensional structures specifically designed to provide structural and mechanical support for cell adhesion, proliferation and growth, with the aim of mimicking the properties of the extracellular matrix. They are typically fabricated from different biomaterials, including polymers, ceramics or composite systems, using various techniques such as electrospinning, freeze-drying, solvent casting and particulate leaching and 3D printing. The interconnected porosity of these structures is a fundamental characteristic that facilitates the diffusion of nutrients, waste products and signalling molecules. Scaffolds can thus incorporate oxygen generating materials to supply oxygen and maintain local oxygen availability in order to enhance cell viability, support angiogenesis and reduce hypoxic conditions. As a result, they are widely explored in tissue engineering and regenerative medicine applications, particularly for bone, cartilage and skin repair.

=== Films ===
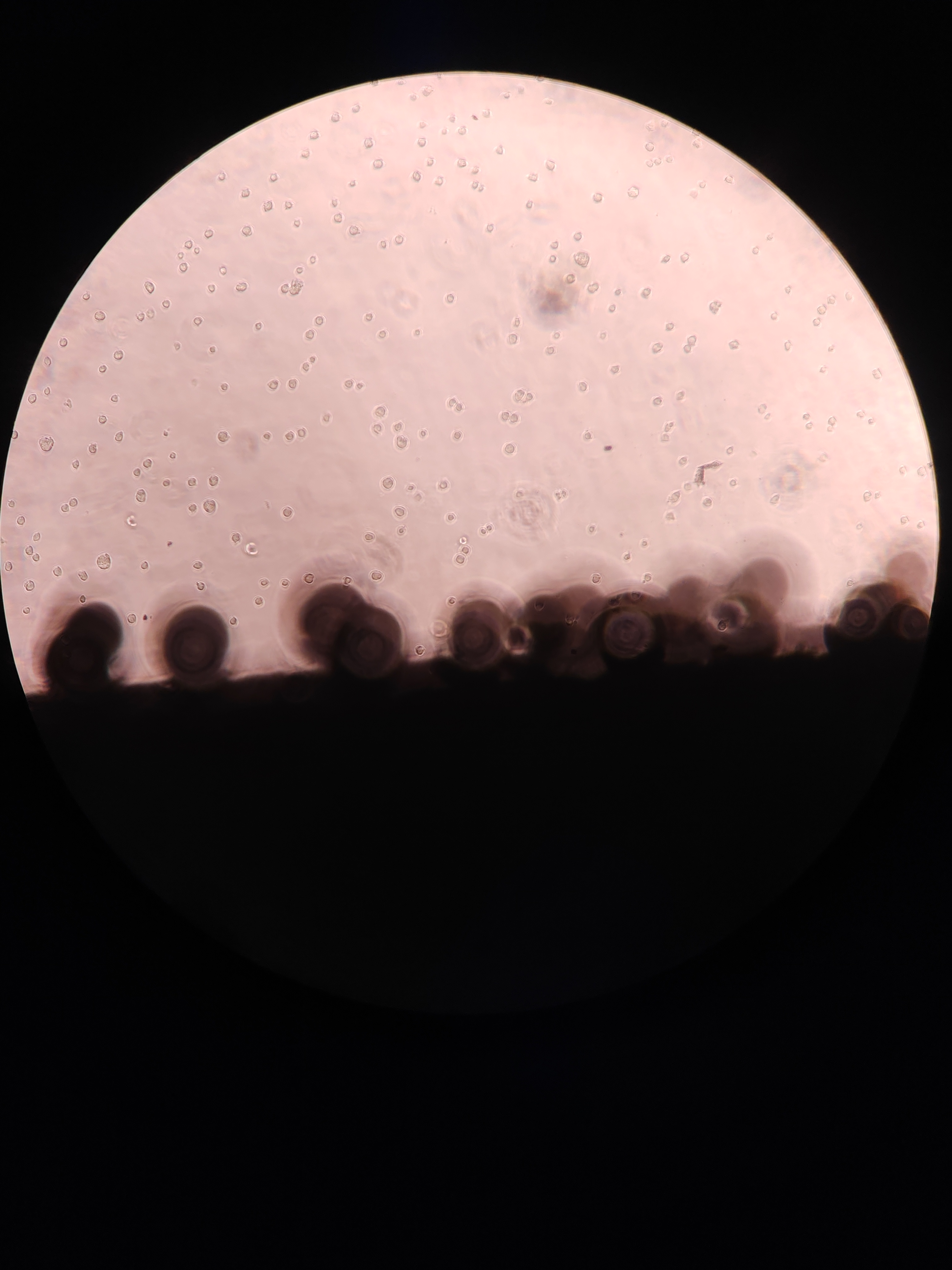
Microscope image of oxygen bubbles generated from a film

Films are thin biomaterial structures typically made from polymers, both natural, such as chitosan or collagen, and synthetic, such as polycaprolactone (PCL) and poly(lactic-co-glycolic acid) (PLGA). They are widely used for a variety of biomedical applications because, according to their properties, composition and design, they can achieve different functions. Films can incorporate oxygen generating materials within their matrix. Oxygen generating films have been explored for various biomedical applications, including wound dressings, tissue preservation, and implantable devices.

=== Microspheres and nanoparticles ===
Microspheres and nanoparticles are particulate biomaterials ranging in size from the micrometer to nanometer scale, respectively. They are designed to embed specific agents, enabling their controlled release to the target area. They can be synthesized using different materials, such as biodegradable polymers, lipids or inorganic compounds. Due to their high surface-area-to-volume ratio and tunable reactivity, these systems are particularly effective for encapsulation of oxygen generating materials, allowing for controlled release kinetics and targeted delivery. Micro/nano scale particulate oxygen-releasing materials also possess the advantage of being injectable or incorporated within larger structures, such as hydrogels, scaffolds or films, and these systems are being investigated due to their ability to provide oxygen supply, reduce hypoxia and improve tissue regeneration.

=== Composite systems ===
Composite systems refer to the combination of two or more biomaterial platforms within a single construct. These hybrid oxygen generating systems are created to combine the properties and advantages of different biomaterials. They can thus integrate combinations of hydrogels, scaffolds, films, microspheres, and nanoparticles to achieve multiple functions together with oxygen supply. Examples of such materials include peroxide-loaded hydrogels, microsphere-reinforced scaffolds and multilayer oxygen-generating films.

== See also ==
- Biomaterial
- Biomedical engineering
- Oxygen therapy
- Reactive oxygen species
- Tissue engineering
