= Transition metal tetraperoxide complexes =

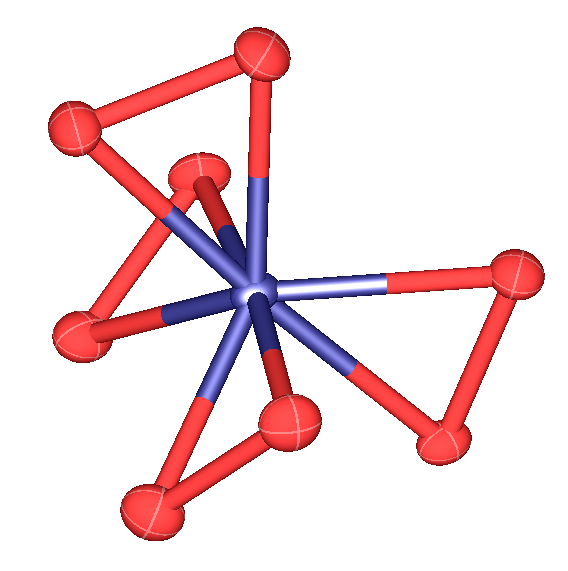
Structure of the [Ti(O_{2})_{4}]^{4−} ion.

Transition metal tetraperoxide complexes are coordination complexes with the formula [M(O_{2})_{4}]^{n−}. They all feature 8-coordinate metal centers with four side-bonded peroxide ligands. The O–O distances, which are near 150 picometers, indicate O^{2−}_{2}. They are prepared by reaction of the metal oxides with an alkaline solution of hydrogen peroxide.

== Examples, by triad ==
Titanium peroxide complexes have long been the basis of a colorimetric test for peroxide. The orange salts M′_{4}[M(O_{2})_{4}] are known for M′ = Li, Na, K.

Tetraperoxides of the vanadium triad are well established; all feature metals in their highest oxidation states. Salts of vanadium(V) tetraperoxide trianion, which is blue, have been known since the 19th century resulting from investigations of the reaction of hydrogen peroxide with vanadium pentoxide. The salts Rb_{3}[Nb(O_{2})_{4}] and K_{3}[Ta(O_{2})_{4}] (colorless) have also been verified by X-ray crystallography.

Among the tetraperoxides of the group 6 metals, [Cr(O_{2})_{4}]^{3−} features d^{1} Cr(V). The metal centers in all other tetraperoxides have the d^{0} electronic configuration. Many salts are known. Early evidence for polyperoxides of Mo and W was obtained by Raman spectroscopy, which is sensitive to the O-O vibration near 800 cm^{−1}. This work was followed by crystallographic confirmation of the alkali metal salts of [Mo(O_{2})_{4}]^{2−} and [W(O_{2})_{4}]^{2−}, which are red and yellow, respectively.
