= Solvated electron =

Free electron in a solution, often liquid ammonia

A solvated electron is a free electron in a solution, in which it behaves like an anion. An electron's being solvated in a solution means it is bound by the solution. The notation for a solvated electron in formulas of chemical reactions is "e^{−}". Often, discussions of solvated electrons focus on their solutions in ammonia, which are stable for days, but solvated electrons also occur in water and many other solvents – in fact, in any solvent that mediates outer-sphere electron transfer. Solvated electrons are frequent objects of study in radiation chemistry. Salts containing solvated electrons are known as electrides.

== Ammonia solutions ==
Liquid ammonia will dissolve all of the alkali metals and other electropositive metals such as Ca, Sr, Ba, Eu, and Yb (also Mg using an electrolytic process), giving characteristic blue solutions. For alkali metals in liquid ammonia, the solution is blue when dilute and copper-colored when more concentrated (> 3 molar). These solutions conduct electricity. The blue colour of the solution is due to ammoniated electrons, which absorb energy in the visible region of light. The diffusivity of the solvated electron in liquid ammonia can be determined using potential-step chronoamperometry.

Solvated electrons in ammonia are the anions of salts called electrides.

Na + 6 NH_{3} → [Na(NH_{3})_{6}]^{+} + e^{−}

The reaction is reversible: evaporation of the ammonia solution produces a film of metallic sodium.

=== Case study: Li in NH_{3} ===
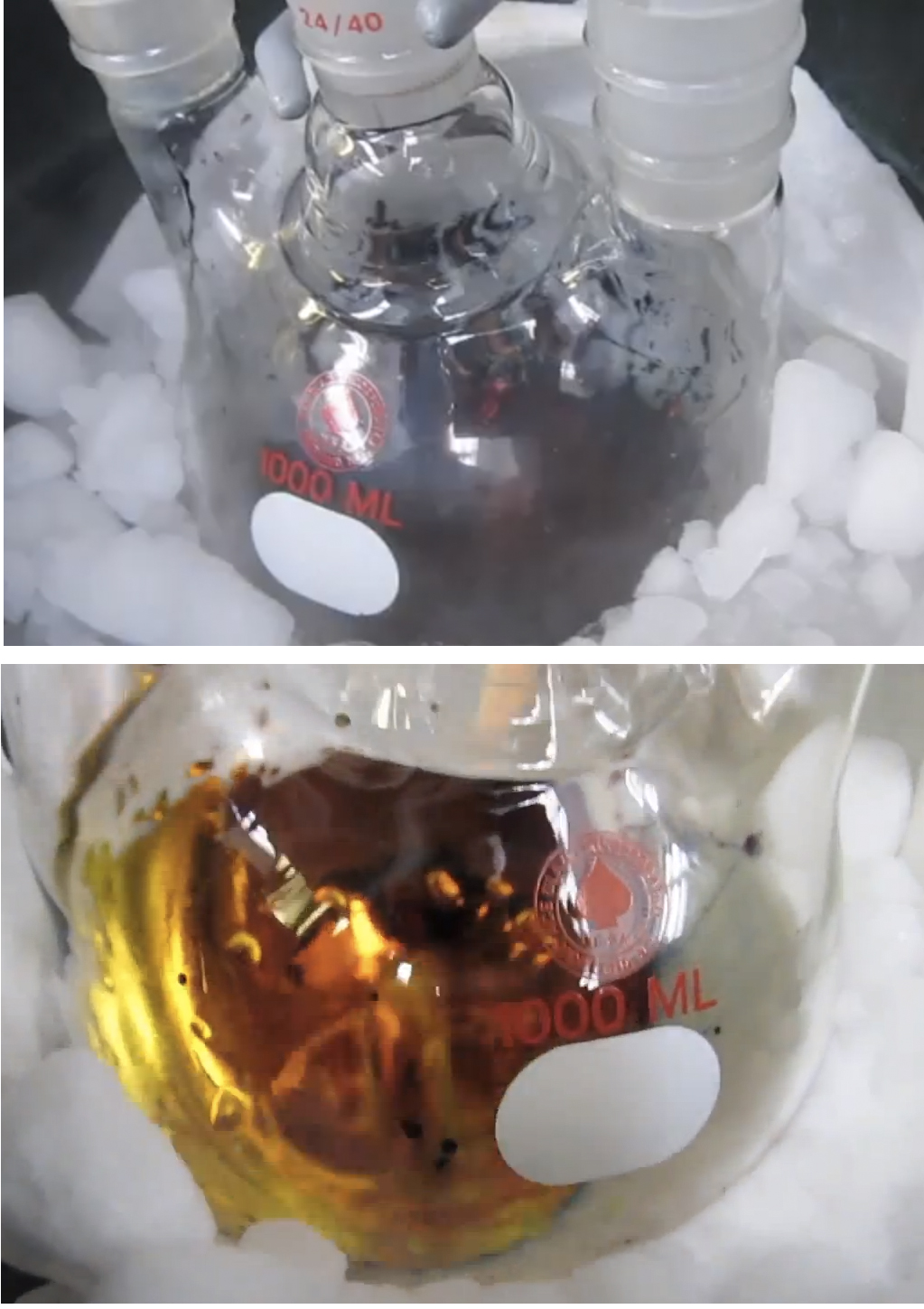
Solutions obtained by dissolution of lithium in liquid ammonia. The solution at the top has a dark blue color and the lower one a golden color. The colors are characteristic of solvated electrons at electronically insulating and metallic concentrations, respectively.

A lithium–ammonia solution at −60 °C is saturated at about 15 mol% metal (MPM). When the concentration is increased in this range electrical conductivity increases from 10^{−2} to 10^{4} Ω^{−1}cm^{−1} (larger than liquid mercury). At around 8 MPM, a "transition to the metallic state" (TMS) takes place (also called a "metal-to-nonmetal transition" (MNMT)). At 4 MPM a liquid-liquid phase separation takes place: the less dense gold-colored phase becomes immiscible from a denser blue phase. Above 8 MPM the solution is bronze/gold-colored. In the same concentration range the overall density decreases by 30%.

== Other solvents ==
Alkali metals also dissolve in some small primary amines, such as methylamine and ethylamine and hexamethylphosphoramide, forming blue solutions. Tetrahydrofuran (THF) dissolves alkali metal, but a Birch reduction (see § Applications) analogue does not proceed without a diamine ligand. Solvated electron solutions of the alkaline earth metals magnesium, calcium, strontium and barium in ethylenediamine have been used to intercalate graphite with these metals.

== Water ==
In water, the formation of a solvated electron proceeds through the wet electron state, in which the electron is not fully solvated, but still stabilized by hydrogen bonds.

Solvated electrons are involved in the reaction of alkali metals with water, even though the solvated electron has only a fleeting existence. Below pH = 9.6 the hydrated electron reacts with the hydronium ion giving atomic hydrogen, which in turn can react with the hydrated electron giving hydroxide ion and usual molecular hydrogen H_{2}.

Solvated electrons can be found even in the gas phase. This implies their possible existence in the upper atmosphere of Earth and involvement in nucleation and aerosol formation.

Its standard electrode potential value is −2.88 V. The equivalent conductivity of 177 Mho cm^{2} is similar to that of hydroxide ion. This value of equivalent conductivity corresponds to a diffusivity of 4.75 $\times 10^{-5}$ cm^{2}s^{−1}.

== Reactivity ==
Although quite stable, the blue ammonia solutions containing solvated electrons degrade rapidly in the presence of catalysts to give colorless solutions of sodium amide:

2 [Na(NH_{3})_{6}]^{+}e^{−} → H_{2} + 2 NaNH_{2} + 10 NH_{3}

Electride salts can be isolated by the addition of macrocyclic ligands such as crown ether and cryptands to solutions containing solvated electrons. These ligands strongly bind the cations and prevent their re-reduction by the electron.

[Na(NH_{3})_{6}]^{+}e^{−} + cryptand → [Na(cryptand)]^{+}e^{−}+ 6 NH_{3}

The solvated electron reacts with oxygen to form a superoxide radical (O_{2}^{.−}). With nitrous oxide, solvated electrons react to form nitroxyl radicals (NO^{.}).

== Uses ==
Solvated electrons are involved in electrode processes, a broad area with many technical applications (electrosynthesis, electroplating, electrowinning).

A specialized use of sodium-ammonia solutions is the Birch reduction. Other reactions where sodium is used as a reducing agent also are assumed to involve solvated electrons, e.g. the use of sodium in ethanol as in the Bouveault–Blanc reduction.

Work by Cullen et al. showed that metal-ammonia solutions can be used to intercalate a range of layered materials, which can then be exfoliated in polar, aprotic solvents, to produce ionic solutions of two-dimensional materials. An example of this is the intercalation of graphite with potassium and ammonia, which is then exfoliated by spontaneous dissolution in THF to produce a graphenide solution.

== History ==
The observation of the color of metal-electride solutions is generally attributed to Humphry Davy. In 1807–1809, he examined the addition of grains of potassium to gaseous ammonia (liquefaction of ammonia was invented in 1823). James Ballantyne Hannay and J. Hogarth repeated the experiments with sodium in 1879–1880. W. Weyl in 1864 and C. A. Seely in 1871 used liquid ammonia, whereas Hamilton Cady in 1897 related the ionizing properties of ammonia to that of water. Charles A. Kraus measured the electrical conductance of metal ammonia solutions and in 1907 attributed it to the electrons liberated from the metal. In 1918, G. E. Gibson and W. L. Argo introduced the solvated electron concept. They noted based on absorption spectra that different metals and different solvents (methylamine, ethylamine) produce the same blue color, attributed to a common species, the solvated electron. In the 1970s, solid salts containing electrons as the anion were characterized.
