= Wet electron =

Quasi-free electron state in water

A wet electron in chemistry and physics is an electron in a medium (such as water) that has been excited into a state that is localized but not associated with a particular atom or molecule. This kind of state is often said to be "quasi-free". Wet electrons become solvated by glassy and liquid media similarly to an ion, resulting in a solvated electron. This is possible since the timescale of their existence in water at room temperature (and other hydrogen bonded liquids) is comparable to or larger than that for rearrangements of the hydrogen bond network, ranging from femtoseconds to picoseconds among media studied.

The hydrogen atoms of water molecules can either participate in the network of hydrogen bonds or be "dangling". The dangling hydrogen atoms are the ones which (transiently) stabilize the wet electron state. In various liquids and glasses, particularly hydrogen bonding ones, wet electrons develop solvation shells with well-defined geometric structures. Elucidating these structures was an early application of ESR spectroscopy.

Advanced experimental techniques such as pulse radiolysis and time-resolved spectroscopy have been pivotal in detecting and studying the behavior of wet electrons. These methods allow scientists to generate wet electrons and observe their transient absorption features and monitor their behavior in real-time. Theoretical studies, particularly those using hybrid functional molecular dynamics simulations, provide deeper insights into the dynamics and energetics of wet electrons. These studies have shown that the spatial extent of the wet electron fluctuates rapidly while the surrounding molecules rearrange to solvate the electron.

The term "wet electron" is variably used in the literature to describe: the transition state of an electron between the quasi-free and solvated states; any electron that is not bound to a particular atom or molecule in a noncrystalline medium; a solvated electron; or something in between.

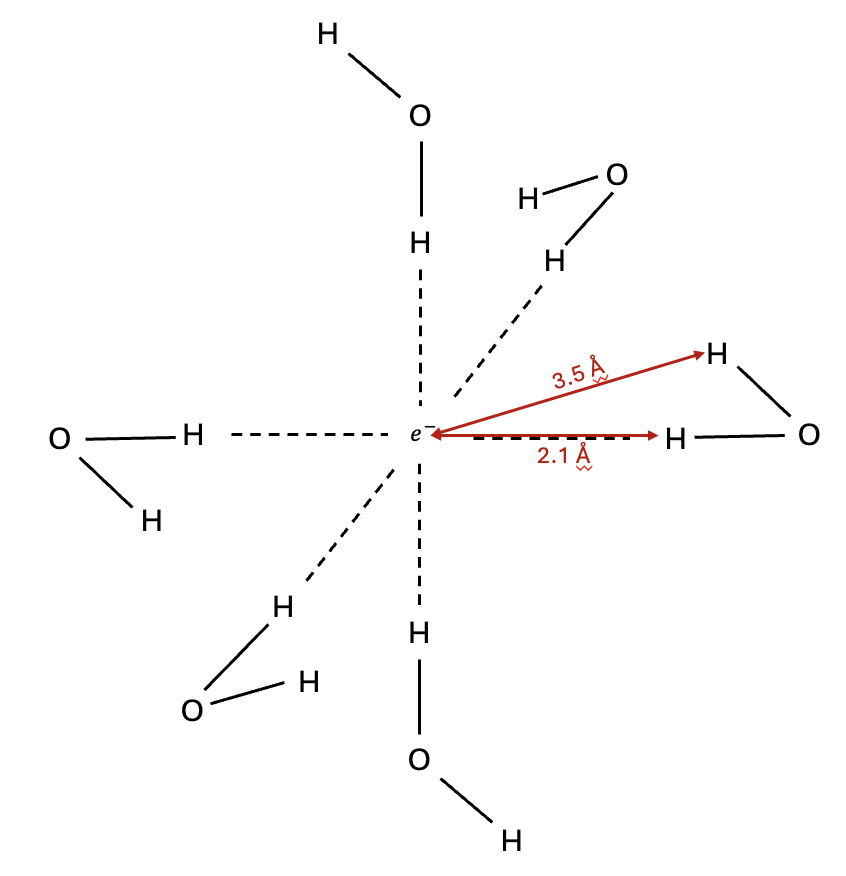
Octahedral structure of the solvated electron in water inferred from ENDOR spectroscopy.

== Formation and localization ==
Wet electrons are produced when high-energy radiation, such as gamma rays, X-rays, or energetic particles, ionizes water molecules. This ionization results in the liberation of electrons, which, instead of remaining free, can become transiently localized due to induced polarization of the surrounding water molecules. During the solvation process, the electron rapidly oscillates between localized (~ 1-10 Å) and delocalized (~ 40 Å) states while disrupting the hydrogen bond network to form a coordination shell of solvent molecules.

== Chemical properties ==
Wet electrons are characterized by their intermediate energy state, which is above the ground state energy of water but below the energy level of a free electron. This state is highly reactive due to its excess energy, making wet electrons potent reducing agents capable of engaging in various chemical reactions. The wet electron and hydrated electron states have lifetimes in the range of hundreds of femtoseconds to picoseconds, with the latter typically lasting longer, depending on the specific environmental conditions and the presence of other reactive species.

== Energetics and structural dynamics ==
The energy associated with the localized state of wet electrons is typically a few tenths of an eV below the conduction band minimum. This energy state reflects the complex interplay between the electron and the polar environment of water. Theoretical investigations indicate that the localization of a wet electron involves a severe distortion of the local hydrogen-bond network, often resulting in the formation of a transient cavity within the liquid structure. This cavity is formed by the rearrangement of water molecules around the trapped electron, influenced by their dipolar nature.

During the solvation process, the "wet" electron oscillates rapidly between a large, quasi-free state and a localized state. During this phase, which lasts around 220 fs in pure water, the electron "digs" a solvation shell that afterwards hosts the electron, at which point it is referred to as a "hydrated" or "solvated electron".

== At interfaces ==
In the case of some materials such as titanium dioxide, wet electrons can also be excited from across the interface of the material with water. This is generally the lowest energy pathway for charge transfer across the interface. It also requires less energy than excitation from a bound state of a water molecule. When generated near the interface of titanium dioxide and water, wet electrons are attracted to the positively charged protonated oxide surface. These electrons in turn affect the interaction of other materials with the oxide.
