= Group 6 =

Group 6 may refer to:

- Group 6 element, chemical element classification
- Group 6 (motorsport), FIA classification for sports car racing
- Group 6 Rugby League, rugby league competition in New South Wales, Australia
