= Calcium peroxide =

Chemical compound

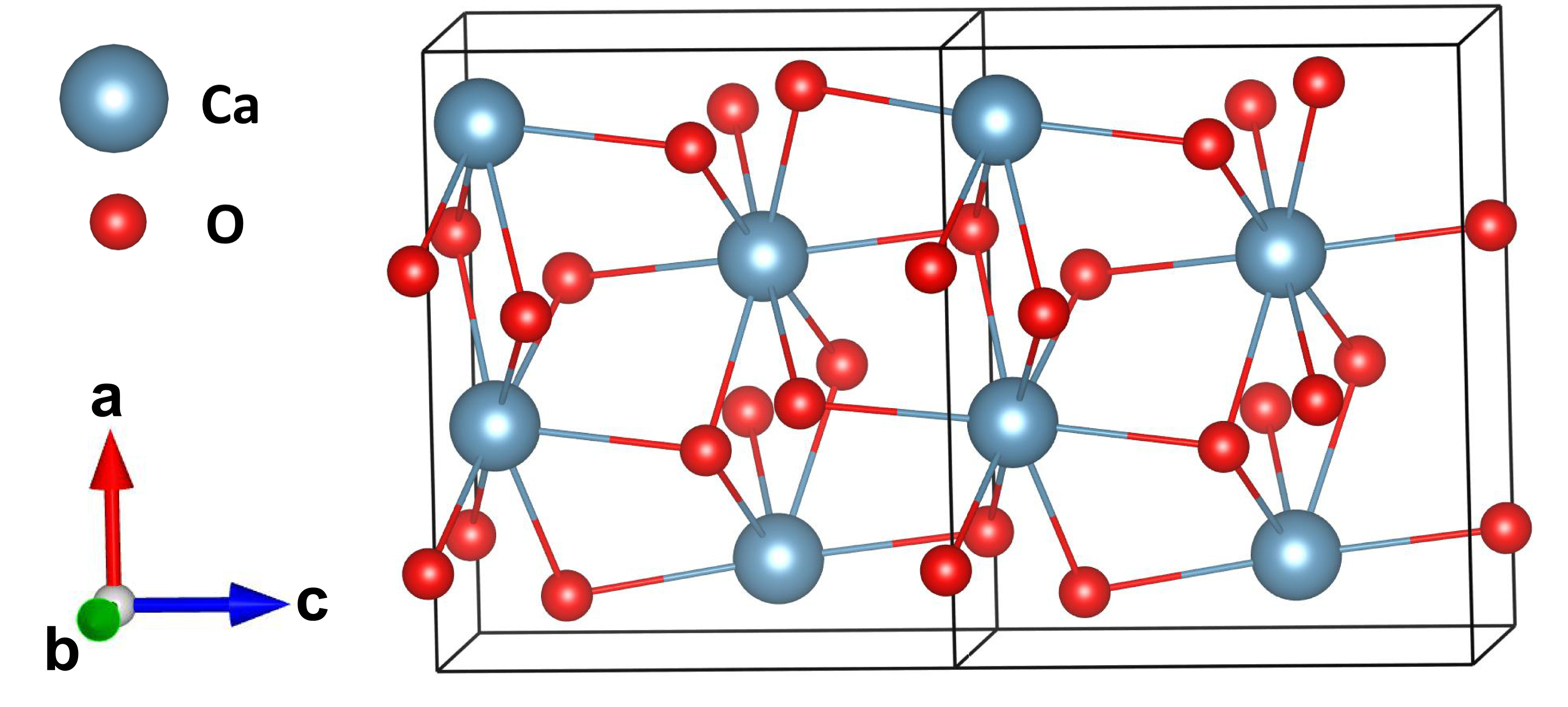
- Calcium peroxide

Names
- Other names: Calcium dioxide

Identifiers
CAS Number	1305-79-9
3D model (JSmol)	Interactive image
ChEBI	CHEBI:48233
ChemSpider	14096
ECHA InfoCard	100.013.764
EC Number	215-139-4
E number	E930 (glazing agents, ...)
Gmelin Reference	674257
KEGG	C18566
PubChem CID	14779
RTECS number	EW3865000
UNII	7FRO2ENO91
UN number	1457
CompTox Dashboard (EPA)	DTXSID4050489
- InChI: InChI=1S/Ca.O2/c;1-2/q+2;-2 Key: LHJQIRIGXXHNLA-UHFFFAOYSA-N; InChI=1/Ca.O2/c;1-2/q+2;-2 Key: LHJQIRIGXXHNLA-UHFFFAOYAW
- SMILES: [Ca+2].[O-][O-]

Properties
Chemical formula	CaO_{2}
Molar mass	72.076 g·mol^{−1}
Appearance	white or yellowish powder
Odor	odorless
Density	2.91 g/cm^{3}
Melting point	~ 355 °C (671 °F; 628 K) (decomposes)
Solubility in water	decomposes
Acidity (pK_{a})	12.5
Magnetic susceptibility (χ)	−23.8·10^{−6} cm^{3}/mol
Refractive index (n_{D})	1.895

Structure
Crystal structure	Orthorhombic
Space group	Pna2_{1}
Coordination geometry	8

Hazards
- GHS labelling
Pictograms	(GHS03: Oxidizing) (GHS07: Exclamation mark)
Signal word	Warning
Hazard statements	H272, H315, H319, H335
Precautionary statements	P210, P220, P221, P261, P264, P271, P280, P302+P352, P304+P340, P305+P351+P338, P312, P321, P332+P313, P337+P313, P362, P370+P378, P403+P233, P405, P501
- Lethal dose or concentration (LD, LC)
LD_{50} (median dose)	>5000 mg/kg (oral, rat) >10000 mg/kg (dermal, rat)

Related compounds
Other anions	Calcium oxide
Other cations	Strontium peroxide Barium peroxide Sodium peroxide
- Except where otherwise noted, data are given for materials in their standard state (at 25 °C [77 °F], 100 kPa). verify (what is ?) Infobox references

Calcium peroxide or calcium dioxide is the inorganic compound with the formula CaO_{2}. It is the peroxide (O_{2}^{2−}) salt of Ca^{2+}. Commercial samples can be yellowish, but the pure compound is white. It is almost insoluble in water.

== Structure and stability ==
As a solid, it is relatively stable against decomposition. In contact with water however it hydrolyzes with release of oxygen. Upon treatment with an acid, it forms hydrogen peroxide.

$\ce{2CaO2 + 2H2O -> 2Ca(OH)2 + O2}$

$\ce{CaO2 + 2H+ -> Ca^2+ + H2O2}$

== Preparation ==
Calcium peroxide is produced by combining calcium salts and hydrogen peroxide:

Ca(OH)_{2} + H_{2}O_{2} → CaO_{2} + 2 H_{2}O

The octahydrate precipitates upon the reaction of calcium hydroxide with dilute hydrogen peroxide. Upon heating it dehydrates.

== Applications ==
It is mainly used as an oxidant to enhance the extraction of precious metals from their ores. In its second main application, it is used as a food additive under the E number E930 it is used as flour bleaching agent and improving agent.

In agriculture it is used in the presowing treatments of rice seed. Also, calcium peroxide has found use in aquaculture to oxygenate and disinfect water. In the ecological restoration industry it is used in the treatment of soils. Calcium peroxide is used in a similar manner to magnesium peroxide for environmental restoration programs. It is used to restore soil and groundwater contaminated with petroleum by the process of enhanced in-situ bioremediation. It is a minor component of some dentifrices.

It is also used for curing polythioether polymers by oxidising terminal thiol groups to disulphide bridges.
