= Magnesium peroxide =

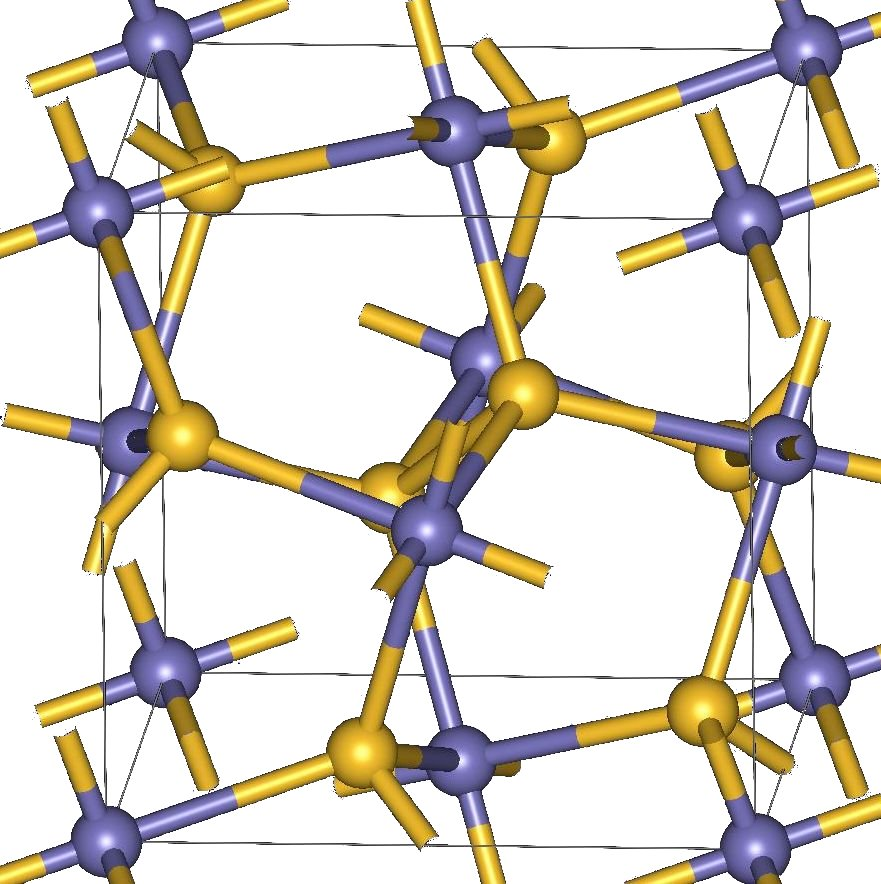

Names
- IUPAC name Magnesium peroxide
- Other names Magnesium dioxide, magnesium bioxide, UN 1476

Identifiers
CAS Number	14452-57-4
3D model (JSmol)	Interactive image
ChemSpider	55637
ECHA InfoCard	100.034.928
EC Number	238-438-1
PubChem CID	61745
UNII	X8YVJ0TN96
CompTox Dashboard (EPA)	DTXSID9049667
- InChI: InChI=1S/Mg.O2/c;1-2/q+2;-2 Key: SPAGIJMPHSUYSE-UHFFFAOYSA-N; InChI=1/Mg.O2/c;1-2/q+2;-2 Key: SPAGIJMPHSUYSE-UHFFFAOYAN
- SMILES: [Mg+2].[O-][O-]

Properties
Chemical formula	MgO_{2}
Molar mass	56.3038 g/mol
Appearance	White or off-white powder
Density	3 g/cm^{3}
Melting point	223 °C (433 °F; 496 K)
Boiling point	350 °C (662 °F; 623 K) (decomposes)
Solubility in water	insoluble

Structure
Crystal structure	Cubic, cP12
Space group	Pa3̅, No. 205

Pharmacology
ATC code	A02AA03 (WHO) A06AD03 (WHO)

Hazards
- GHS labelling
Pictograms	(GHS03: Oxidizing)
Signal word	Warning
Hazard statements	H272
Precautionary statements	P210, P220, P221, P280, P370+P378, P501
NFPA 704 (fire diamond)	2 0 1 OX
- Except where otherwise noted, data are given for materials in their standard state (at 25 °C [77 °F], 100 kPa). verify (what is ?) Infobox references

Magnesium peroxide (MgO_{2}) is an odorless fine powder peroxide with a white to off-white color. It is similar to calcium peroxide because magnesium peroxide also releases oxygen by breaking down at a controlled rate with water. Commercially, magnesium peroxide often exists as a compound of magnesium peroxide and magnesium hydroxide.

== Structure ==
O_{2}, similarly to N_{2}, has the ability to bind either side-on or end-on. The structure of MgO_{2} has been calculated as a triangular shape with the O_{2} molecule binding side-on to the magnesium. This arrangement is a result of the Mg^{+} donating charge to the oxygen and creating a Mg^{2+}O_{2}^{2−}. The bond between to O_{2} and the magnesium atom has an approximate dissociation energy of 90 kJ mol^{−1}.

In the solid state, MgO_{2} has a cubic pyrite-type crystal structure with 6-coordinate Mg^{2+} ions and O_{2}^{2−} peroxide-groups, according to experimental data and evolutionary crystal structure prediction, the latter predicting a phase transition at the pressure of 53 GPa to a tetragonal structure with 8-coordinate Mg^{2+} ions. While at normal conditions MgO_{2} is a metastable compound (less stable than 2 MgO + O_{2}), at pressures above 116 GPa it is predicted to become thermodynamically stable in the tetragonal phase. This theoretical prediction has been experimentally confirmed via synthesis in a laser-heated diamond anvil cell.

== Synthesis ==
MgO_{2} can be produced by mixing MgO with hydrogen peroxide to create magnesium peroxide and water. This being an exothermic reaction should be cooled and kept around 30–40 degrees Celsius. It is also important to remove as much iron from the reaction environment as possible due to iron's ability to catalyze the degradation of the peroxide. The addition of oxygen stabilizers such as sodium silicate can also be used to help prevent the premature degradation of the peroxide. Regardless, a good yield from this reaction is only about 35%.

MgO + H_{2}O_{2} → MgO_{2} + H_{2}O

High yields are further complicated by the fact that MgO_{2} reacts with water to degrade the peroxide into magnesium hydroxide, also known as milk of magnesia.

== Applications ==
Magnesium peroxide is a stable oxygen releasing compound, which is used in agricultural and environmental industries. It is used to reduce contaminant levels in groundwater. Magnesium peroxide is used in the bioremediation of contaminated soil and can improve the soil quality for plant growth and metabolism. It is also used in the aquaculture industry for bioremediation.

For sanitation purposes magnesium peroxide is often used as a source of oxygen for aerobic organisms in the treatment and disposal of biological waste. Since the breakdown of hydrocarbons in soil is usually quicker in aerobic conditions, MgO_{2} can also be added to compost piles or in soil to speed up the microbe activities and to reduce the odors produced in the process.

In certain circumstances MgO_{2} has also been shown to inhibit growth of bacteria. In particular, the growth of sulfate-reducing bacteria can be inhibited in an environment containing magnesium peroxide. While the oxygen slowly dissociates, it is theorized that it may then act to displace the sulfate that normally acts as the terminal electron acceptor in their electron transport chain.

== Toxicity ==
Magnesium peroxide is an irritant that can cause redness, itching, swelling, and may burn the skin and eyes on contact. Inhalation can also cause irritation to the lungs, nose, and throat, as well as causing coughing. Long term exposure may lead to lung damage, shortness of breath, and tightening of the chest. Ingestion of MgO_{2} can cause numerous adverse effects including: bloating, belching, abdominal pain, irritation of the mouth and throat, nausea, vomiting, and diarrhea.

Environmentally, magnesium peroxide is not a naturally occurring compound and is not known to persist in the environment for prolonged times, in its complete state, or to bio-accumulate. The natural degradation of MgO_{2} leads to magnesium hydroxide, O_{2}, and H_{2}O. If spilled, MgO_{2} should be contained and isolated from any waterways, sewer drains, and it should be isolated from combustible materials or chemicals including paper, cloth, and wood.

== Common environmental reactions ==
Magnesium exists in the upper atmosphere in a variety of different molecular forms. Due to its ability to react with common oxygen and simple carbon-oxygen compounds the magnesium may exist in oxidized compounds including MgO_{2}, OMgO_{2}, MgO, and O_{2}MgO_{2}.

MgCO_{3} + O → MgO_{2} + CO_{2}

OMgO_{2} + O → MgO_{2} + O_{2}

MgO + O_{3} → MgO_{2} + O_{2}

MgO_{2} + O_{2} → O_{2}MgO_{2}

MgO_{2} + O → MgO + O_{2}

In contact with water it decomposes by the reactions:

MgO_{2} + 2 H_{2}O → Mg(OH)_{2} + H_{2}O_{2}

2 H_{2}O_{2} → 2 H_{2}O + O_{2}
