= Zinc peroxide =

- Zn^{2+} [O_{2}^{2−}]

Names
- Other names zinc dioxide zinc bioxide

Identifiers
CAS Number	1314-22-3
3D model (JSmol)	Interactive image
ChemSpider	8305421
ECHA InfoCard	100.013.843
EC Number	215-226-7
PubChem CID	10129902
UNII	0I969DVM77
CompTox Dashboard (EPA)	DTXSID5051658
- InChI: InChI=1S/O2.Zn/c1-2;/q-2;+2 Key: IPTOGCUGCFHDSS-UHFFFAOYSA-N
- SMILES: [Zn+2].[O-][O-]

Properties
Chemical formula	ZnO_{2}
Molar mass	97.408 g/mol
Appearance	white-yellowish powder
Density	1.57 g/cm^{3}
Melting point	212 °C (414 °F; 485 K) (decomposes)
Band gap	3.8 eV (indirect)

Structure
Crystal structure	Cubic
Space group	Pa3̅

Hazards
- GHS labelling
Pictograms	(GHS03: Oxidizing) (GHS07: Exclamation mark)
Signal word	Warning
Hazard statements	H271, H315, H319
NFPA 704 (fire diamond)	3 0 1
- Except where otherwise noted, data are given for materials in their standard state (at 25 °C [77 °F], 100 kPa). verify (what is ?) Infobox references

Zinc peroxide (ZnO_{2}) is a chemical compound of zinc that appears as a bright yellow powder at room temperature. It was historically used as a surgical antiseptic. More recently zinc peroxide has also been used as an oxidant in explosives and pyrotechnic mixtures. Its properties have been described as a transition between ionic and covalent peroxides.

== Preparation and structure ==
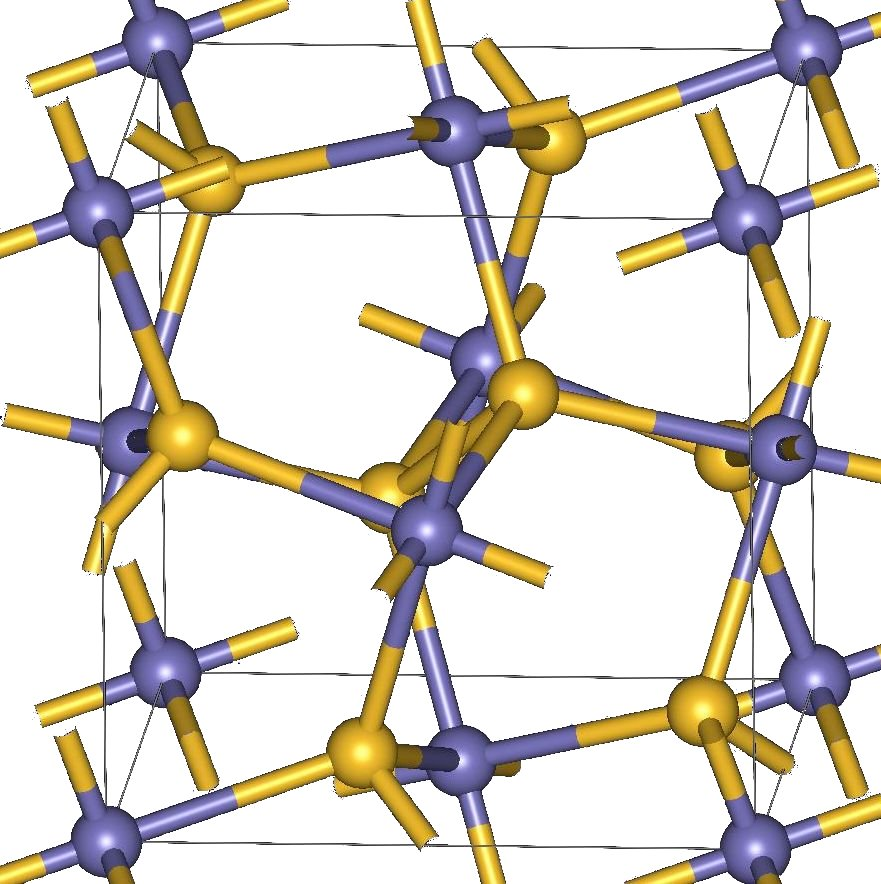
Structure of solid zinc peroxide

Zinc peroxide can be synthesized through the reaction of zinc chloride and hydrogen peroxide.

According to X-ray crystallography, the compound consists of octahedral Zn(II) centers bonded to six distinct peroxide (O_{2}^{2−}) ligands. The overall motif is very similar to that for iron pyrite (FeS_{2}). The structure, with intact O-O bonds, makes clear that this material is a peroxide, not a dioxide.

== Medical Use ==
The treatment of burrowing ulcers in the abdominal wall with zinc peroxide was first recorded in 1933 and throughout the 1940s ZnO_{2} was used as a disinfectant in surgical . Zinc peroxide was, however, deemed ineffective against certain bacterial strains, such as Streptococcus viridans, staphylococcus aureus, E. coli, B. proteus, and B. pyocyoneus.

== Safety ==
Zinc peroxide is hazardous in case of skin contact, of eye contact, or inhalation.
