= Peroxide =

Chemical compounds with the structure R–O–O–R'

Peroxides are a group of molecules with the structure R−O−O−R, where each R represents a radical (a portion of a complete molecule; not a free radical) and the O's are single oxygen atoms. Oxygen atoms are joined to each other and to adjacent elements through single covalent bonds, denoted by dashes or lines. The O−O group in a peroxide is often called the peroxide group, though some nomenclature discrepancies exist. This linkage is recognized as a common polyatomic ion, and exists in many molecules.

== General structure ==
The characteristic structure of any regular peroxide is the oxygen–oxygen covalent single bond, which connects the two main atoms together. Each oxygen atom has a oxidation state of negative one, as 5 of its valence electrons remain in the outermost orbital shell whilst one is occupied in the covalent bond. Because of the nature of the covalent bond, this arrangement results in each atom having the equivalent of 7 valence electrons, reducing the oxygens and giving them a negative charge. This charge is affected by the addition of other elements, with the properties and structure changing depending on the added group(s).

== Common forms ==
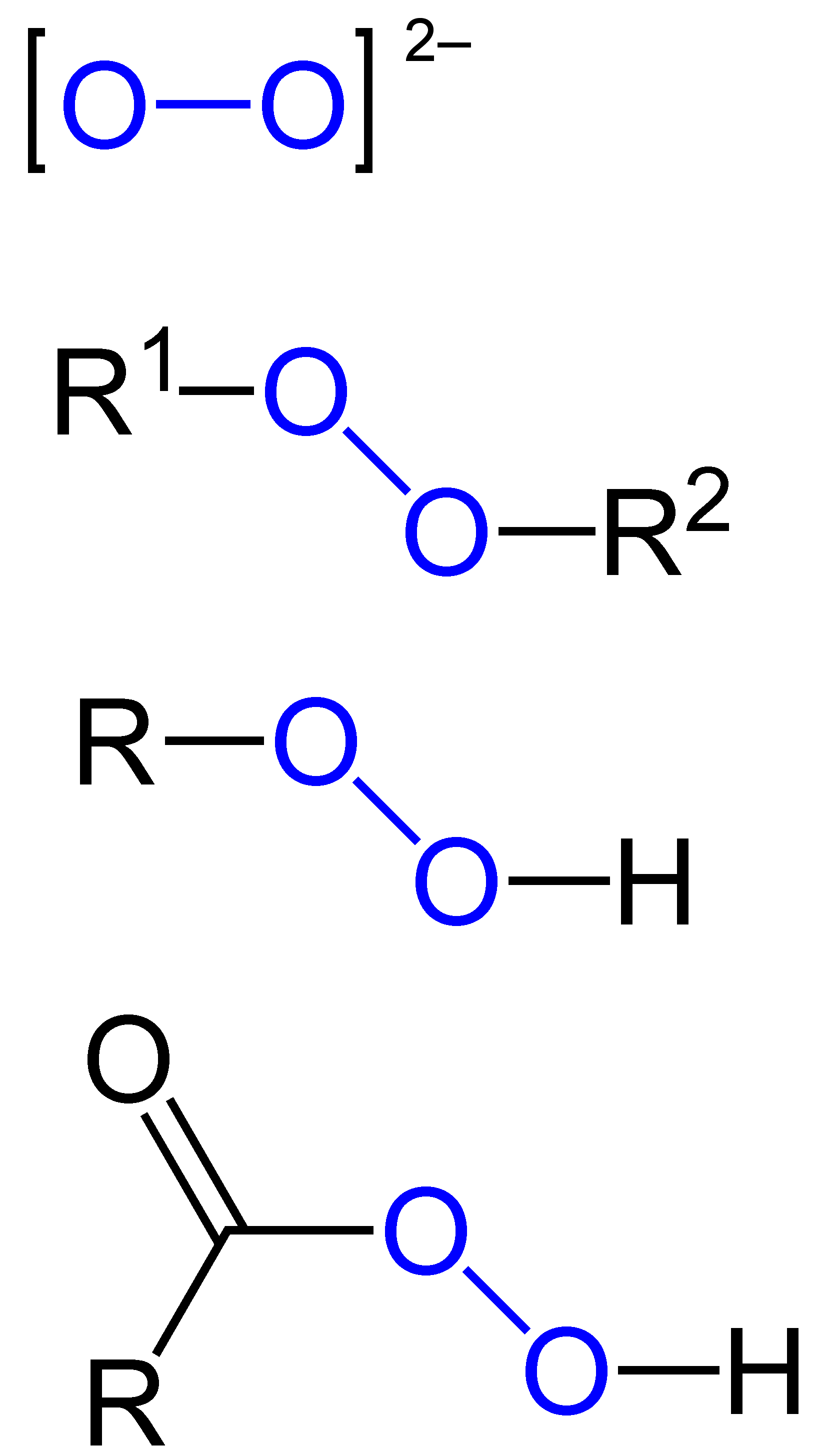
Types of peroxides, from top to bottom: peroxide ion, organic peroxide, hydroperoxide, peracid. The peroxide group is marked in blue. R, R^{1} and R^{2} mark hydrocarbon moieties.

The most common peroxide is hydrogen peroxide (H_{2}O_{2}), colloquially known simply as "peroxide". Many organic peroxides are known as well.

In addition to hydrogen peroxide, some other major classes of peroxides are:

- Peroxy acids, the peroxy derivatives of many familiar acids, examples being peroxymonosulfuric acid and peracetic acid, and their salts, one example of which is potassium peroxydisulfate.
- Main group peroxides, compounds with the linkage E−O−O−E (E = main group element).
  Structure and dimensions of H_{2}O_{2} in gas phase.
- Metal peroxides, examples being barium peroxide (BaO_{2}), sodium peroxide (Na_{2}O_{2}) and zinc peroxide (ZnO_{2}).
- Organic peroxides, compounds with the linkage C−O−O−C or C−O−O−H. One example is tert-butylhydroperoxide.

== Nomenclature ==
The linkage between the oxygen molecules is known as a peroxy group (sometimes called peroxo group, peroxyl group, of peroxy linkage). The nomenclature of the peroxy group is somewhat variable, and exists as an exception to the rules of naming polyatomic ions. This is because, when it was discovered, it was believed to be monatomic. The term was introduced by Thomas Thomson in 1804 for a compound combined with as much oxygen as possible, or the oxide with the greatest quantity of oxygen.
