= National Lithium Strategy =

Lithium extraction policy of Chile

The National Lithium Strategy (Spanish: Estrategia Nacional del Litio) is a policy of the Chilean state aimed to develop lithium extraction –of which Chile currently ranks second in the world– "to increase wealth for the country" and to link "Chile's economic development with the shift towards a global green economy".

== Intended purpose ==
The policy aims to create the following entities, the state-owned mining company National Lithium Company, the Protected Salt Flats Network and the Public Technological and Research Institute of Lithium and Salt Flats. The National Lithium Company and the Chilean Economic Development Agency (CORFO) will join to form the Committee on Lithium and Salt Flats. Among its goals is the diversification of the Chilean economy and of the players in it. The policy also aims to achieve social and economic sustainability in the lithium, and in particular fiscal sustainability.

== Creation and alteration ==
This policy was announced in 2023 by President Gabriel Boric and has been described by OLCA as supporting a frenzied exploitation of lithium resources.

The aim to create a National Lithium Company has been dropped as of 2025, and the National Lithium Strategy has instead directed the creation of the following public–private lithium mining partnerships; Nova Andino Litio (Codelco & SQM), Salares Altoandinos (National Mining Enterprise & Rio Tinto) and Salar de Maricunga (Codelco & Rio Tinto).

== See also ==
- Chilean Copper Commission
- Codelco – state-owned copper mining company in Chile
- National Mining Enterprise
- Lithium mining in Bolivia
- Lithium Triangle
