= Lithium Valley =

Mining area at the Salton Sea, California

- Interactive map of Lithium Valley
- Coordinates: 33°11′10″N 115°33′30″W
- Country: United States
- State: California
- County: Imperial County
- Megaregion: Southern California
- Time zone: UTC−8 (Pacific)
  - Summer (DST): UTC−7 (PDT)

Lithium Valley is an area adjacent to the Salton Sea in Southern California, United States, with enormous deposits of lithium. Due to increased demand for lithium, which is a crucial component for batteries used for electric cars and energy storage, the area is attracting attention, and the extraction of lithium is expected to boost the economy of Imperial County. The area is exceptionally well-suited due to the ability to mine the lithium while generating geothermal power. There are already 11 geothermal power plants utilizing the Salton Sea Geothermal Field.

== Lithium production ==
The geothermal activity below the Salton Sea loosens up lithium that can be mined. The California Energy Commission estimates the Salton Sea might produce 600,000 metric tons of lithium carbonate (Li_{2}CO_{3}) per year, of a reserve of 3.4 million tonnes. The Salton Sea geothermal brine reservoir is located at depths of approximately 0.62 to 1.86 miles (1 to 3 km) below ground and contains fluids at temperatures of 250–380 °C. Among other valuable minerals, the brine contains lithium (202 ppm ± 20%, more than in the Dead Sea, which is 30–40 ppm), rubidium (110 ppm ± 47%), caesium (19.8 ppm ± 15%), and bromine (91 ppm ± 31% compared to 5000 ppm in the Dead Sea). The lake also contains chloride, sodium, calcium, potassium, and other low-value minerals that are difficult to separate. All these minerals add up to the total salinity of 24.3 ± 2.8%.

The Lithium Valley Commission was created under the California Energy Commission in September 2020 to explore and expand the emerging lithium-recovery industry.

== Projects ==
In 2016, the Australian firm Controlled Thermal Resources (CTR) announced plans to build a 140 MW geothermal power plant and a lithium-extraction facility capable of producing 15,000 short tons (14,000 t) by 2023 and 75,000 short tons (68,000 t) by 2027. The company hopes to create a major new domestic source of the mineral. General Motors announced a strategic partnership with CTR in 2021 to secure a local supply of lithium. The majority of the battery-grade lithium hydroxide and lithium carbonate for the Ultium battery will come from this plant.

Controlled Thermal Resources is developing a combined lithium-extraction and power-generation facility in the Hell's Kitchen geothermal field employing a closed-loop process. Brine will be extracted from the ground, with geothermal steam being used to drive a turbine generating electricity, and reacting with the brine to separate the lithium hydroxide and lithium carbonate used for battery production.

Berkshire Hathaway Energy has a subsidiary that operates 10 geothermal plants in the area. Berkshire's BHE Renewables division plans to open a lithium carbonate pilot plant.

== See also ==
- Thacker Pass Lithium Mine – Proposed mining of hectorite clay deposit in Nevada
- Lithium Triangle – Region of South America rich in lithium
- Lithium § Production
- List of countries by lithium production
