= Lithium Triangle =

Region of South America rich in lithium

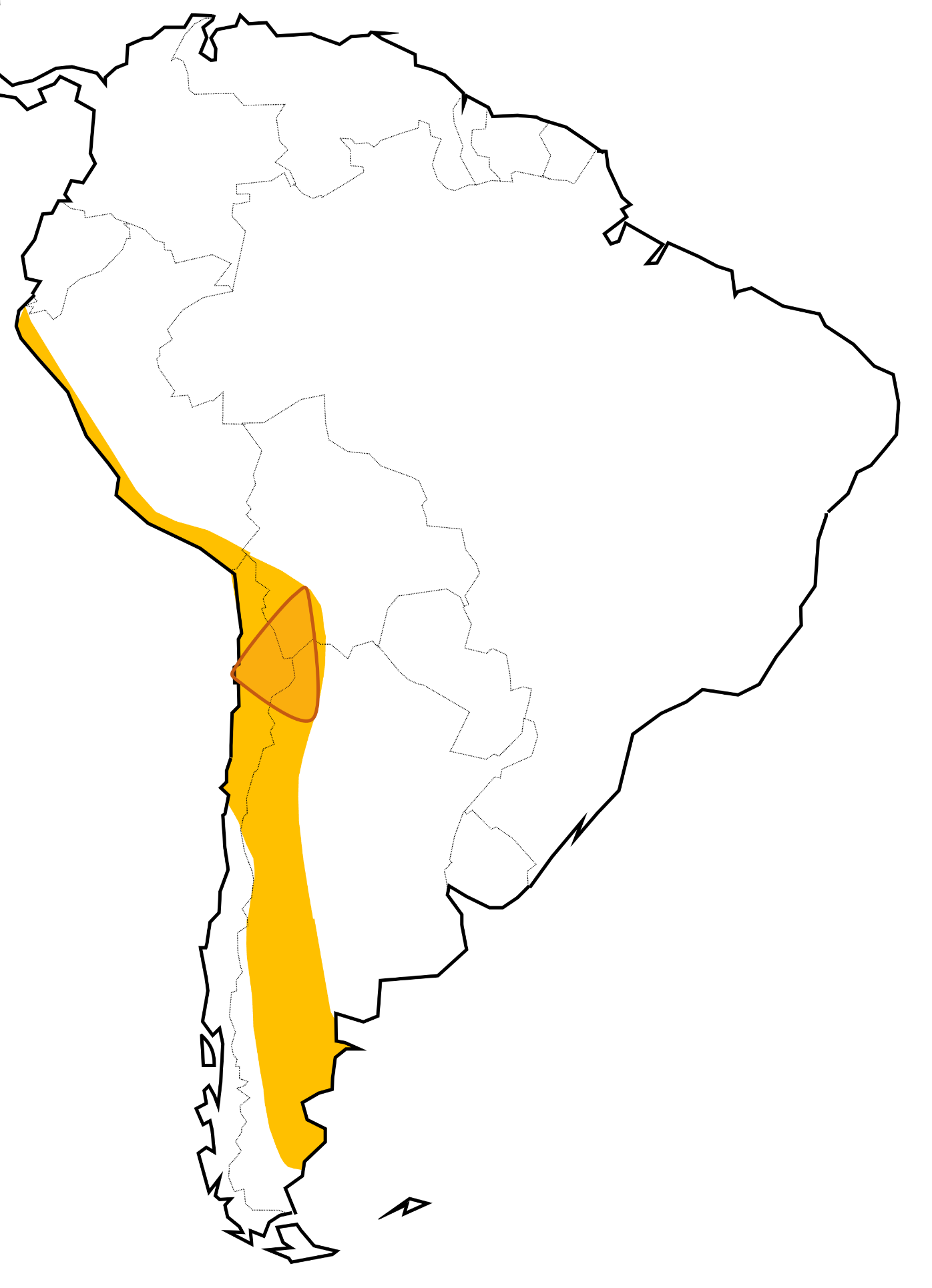
The Lithium Triangle within the Arid Diagonal of South America

The Lithium Triangle (Spanish: Triángulo del Litio) is a region of the Andes that is rich in lithium reserves, encompassed by the borders of Argentina, Bolivia, and Chile. The lithium in the triangle is concentrated in various salt pans that exist along the Atacama Desert and neighboring arid areas. The three main salt pans that define its vertices are the Salar de Uyuni in Bolivia, Salar de Atacama in Chile, and Salar del Hombre Muerto in Argentina. Of these, the core of Salar de Atacama in Chile has the highest concentration of lithium (0.15% by weight) among all world's brine sources. (Note: The cause for the high contraction of lithium in the brines of Salar de Atacama is not fully clear as various competing hypothesis exists. It is suggested that high geothermal gradients and altitude differences in the hydrological basin enhances the leaching of lithium from rocks and minerals. The volcanoes east of Salar de Atacama may have a role in contaminating the incoming streams with salts. Some litium-rich waters entering Salar de Atacama are thought to have been previously concentrated at salt lakes at higher elevation. An important factor for the further concentration and preservation of lithium in the brines of the salt flat is the high evapotranspiration in the area which is related to the extreme aridity and the high solar radiation in the area.)

The shape of the area of interest for lithium resources in salt pans is however not a triangle but more of a crescent starting with Salar de Surire (19° S) in the north and ending with Salar de Maricunga (27° S) in the south. Because of this it has been proposed to rename the area Lithium Crescent.

As of 2017, the area was thought to hold around 54% of the world's lithium reserves; however, these reserves, which are the largest in size and the highest in quality in the world, are not expected to make the surrounding countries wealthy, as oil has done for the Gulf countries. For example, the total amount of lithium minerals in Chile is worth "less than Saudi Arabia's three years' worth of oil exports."

Annual production in the early 2020s was 140,000 tons per year in Chile, 33,000 tons per year in Argentina, and 600 tons per year in Bolivia.

== Background ==
Currently, many countries are trying to incorporate technological solutions to achieve sustainability directives. Many of these directives include solutions for which lithium is an essential resource, such as the shift to electric vehicles and battery storage systems. Yet, in most countries, lithium is not nearly as abundant as in the lithium triangle. Therefore, contemporary power relations in geopolitics have enabled wealthier countries to expand their resource frontiers to the lithium triangle, touching upon notions of green extractivism, to accommodate their needs at the expense of poorer countries. This practice taking place in the lithium triangle leads to severe impact on the environment and socio-economic/socio-cultural livelihoods of local residents.

According to The Economist, Argentina was, by November 2022, the country with most ongoing lithium extraction projects, with a total of 40. By one estimate Argentina could surpass Chile as the second-largest lithium producer by 2029. Similarly, there are estimates that posit Argentina producing 16% of the world's lithium by 2031 instead of the 6% it produced in 2021, surpassed by only Australia worldwide. Low royalty payments when compared to Chile are cited by The Economist as a particular advantage.

In December 2018, Bolivia signed an agreement with the German company ACISA for lithium extraction. The cooperation with ACISA was, by June 2022, deemed to have stalled, with Bolivia negotiating larger lithium projects with Canadian, Chinese, and United States companies. Since the early 2020s, the Bolivian government has been advocating that the countries in the region organize themselves so that they can influence international trade of lithium, including the creation of an organization similar to OPEC.

All lithium extracted in Chile as of 2023 comes from Salar de Atacama. The only two lithium-extracting companies currently operating in Chile, SQM and Albemarle, have licenses to extract lithium until 2030 and 2043 respectively. In April 2023, the Chilean government announced plans for nationalizing its lithium industry. The announcement impacts chiefly the companies SQM and Albemarle. In response, the shares of SQM in the Santiago Stock Exchange dropped by 15% during the day, their largest daily drop since 20 September 2022. The government's decision was thought to have less impact for Albemarle than for SQM given that it had many more years to negotiate before its license expired. The state-owned copper company Codelco was commissioned by the government to negotiate nationalization with SQM.

The indigenous inhabitants of Salar de Atacama basin—the Likan Antay—have a history of both opposing lithium extraction and negotiating for shared benefits with lithium companies. Negotiations occur under the framework of the Indigenous and Tribal Peoples Convention, which Chile signed in 2008. It is argued that "[a]greements between Indigenous organizations and lithium companies have brought significant economic resources for community development, but have also expanded the mining industry's capacity for social control in the area."

This control is rooted in a dominant discourse that has taken root in the global rush to a sustainable future in light of global climate change. With lithium being a key strategic resource in facilitating this shift, many countries are rushing to acquire as much as possible. Any form of protest against such mining operations is deemed to be an opposition to climate change, thus hindering the global agenda in combatting climate change. This discourse has resulted in the marginalisation of opposed indigenous voices, rendering them nearly powerless.

== See also ==
- Lithium Valley – Mining area at the Salton Sea, California
- Lithium § Production
- Chile's National Lithium Strategy
- Lithium mining in Bolivia
- Nova Andino Litio – Lithium mining company

== Bibliography ==
- Dube, Ryan (2022). "The Place With the Most Lithium Is Blowing the Electric-Car Revolution" [El sitio con más litio está perdiéndose la revolución de los carros eléctricos]. The Wall Street Journal. CCLXXX (35). ISSN 1042-9840.
- Quinn, Jack (2024). "El litio: ¿esperanza o espejismo para América Latina?". El Tiempo (Colombia) (in Spanish). ISSN 0121-9987.
