= Salar del Hombre Muerto =

Salt pan in Antofagasta de la Sierra, Argentina

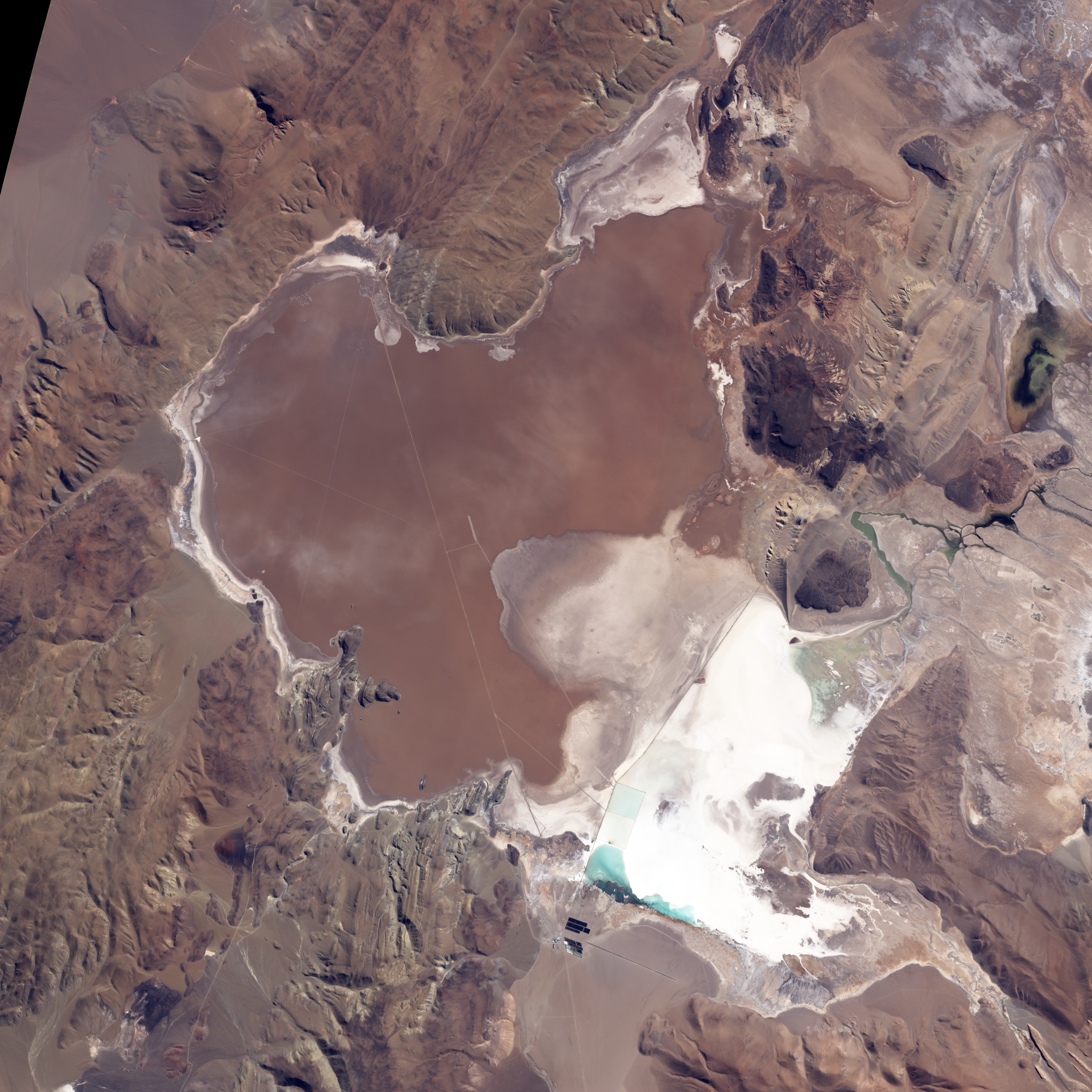
- The western portion of the salt pan; most of eastern portion not pictured

- Location within Argentina
- Coordinates: 25°21′0″S 67°4′12″W
- Type: endorheic
- Etymology: "Lake of the Dead Man", after mummies found in the area
- Primary inflows: Rio de Los Patos, Rio Trapiche
- Primary outflows: Evaporation
- Catchment area: 4,000 square kilometres (1,500 sq mi)
- Surface area: 600 square kilometres (230 sq mi)
- Surface elevation: approximately 4,000 m (13,000 ft)

Salar del Hombre Muerto (transl. Salt Pan of the Dead Man) is a salt pan in Argentina, in the Antofagasta de la Sierra Department on the border between the Salta and Catamarca Provinces. It covers an area of 600 square kilometres (230 sq mi) and is in part covered by debris. During the Pleistocene it was sometimes a lake, but today only parts of the salt pan are covered by perennial water bodies; its major tributary is the Río de los Patos.

Part of the Lithium Triangle of salars, Salar del Hombre Muerto is one of the world's most important sources of lithium, an element crucial for manufacturing lithium-ion batteries, which are very important in renewable energy technology and electric cars.

== Geography and geomorphology ==
Salar del Hombre Muerto is a 600-kilometre (370 mi) salt pan with irregular margins resembling a square. To the north lies the elongated, narrow Lanja Negra or Tincalayu peninsula, while the anvil-shaped Peninsula de Hombre Muerto protrudes from the southeastern side. Between the two lies a central island named Farallon Catal with an area of 72 square kilometres (28 sq mi) that separates Hombre Muerto into two halves, an eastern one and a western one; the eastern part (also known as Salar de Vida) is covered by debris, while the western part is covered by evaporites with a polygonal surface appearance. Two other islands are the Tetas de la Pachamama in the eastern and Cerro Oscuro in the southern sector of the Salar. An open water body covers 65 square kilometres (25 sq mi) in the eastern part. Close to Salar del Hombre Muerto lie ten potential impact craters with diameters of 90–250 metres (300–820 ft) that may have formed during the last 500,000 years and certainly very recently, although they could also be collapse structures in the underlying alluvial fan.

The watershed of Salar del Hombre Muerto has an area of 4,000 square kilometres (1,500 sq mi), half of which is drained by the 150 kilometres (93 mi) long Rio de Los Patos; this river enters into the salar from the northeast but originates on Galán and the Eastern Cordillera south of Hombre Muerto. Another tributary is the Rio Trapiche which comes into Hombre Muerto from the south, the Valle Hombre Muerto which lies between the two and the Rio Ratones from the north. The western side of Hombre Muerto on the other hand has only small springs. The Los Patos river has a discharge of 0.8–2 cubic metres per second (28–71 cu ft/s) and supplies a perennial lake, named Catal Lagoon, and during the rainy season large parts of the salt pan can flood. The discharge of Rio Trapiche is only about 1/9 of that of Rio de Los Patos. The Vega Trapiche and Vega Hombre Muerto wetlands are located on the southern margin of Hombre Muerto.

Salar del Hombre Muerto lies at 4,300–4,100 metres (14,100–13,500 ft) elevation in the southern Puna and is surrounded by mountains, including volcanoes and summits reaching elevations that exceed 5,000 metres (16,000 ft). The Galán volcano lies just south of Hombre Muerto and has produced large ignimbrites, while 5,252 metres (17,231 ft) high Cerro Ratones is located on the northeastern margin; additional volcanoes and faults exist in the area of Hombre Muerto. Farther west-southwest lies the long Salar de Antofalla while the Salar de Ratones and Salar de Diablillos are found north-northeast and northeast from Salar del Hombre Muerto. 302 kilometres (188 mi) farther east lies the city of Salta.

=== Geological history ===
The terrain of the area is formed by crystalline rocks of Paleozoic age, sediments of Paleozoic to Mesozoic age and Cenozoic volcanic rocks such as the 2.2–2 million-year-old Galán. Faults dissect the area and cut southward across the Salar; some volcanoes are associated with them and faulting continued into the Quaternary. The deposition of evaporites appears to have commenced 15 million years ago, perhaps at the same time as endorheic drainage developed, but most of the deposits are of Quaternary age. Volcanic activity also took place in the area of Hombre Muerto, with andesites from its area dated to the Pliocene and Pleistocene; one flow is only about 800,000 years old.

Salar del Hombre Muerto in the past received more water. From the Pleistocene to the Holocene, Salar del Hombre Muerto fluctuated between being a salt lake to being a salt-encrusted salt flat. Wet lake stages occurred during oxygen isotope stage 3 and 4 and during the Last Glacial Maximum, although it was smaller than preceding lake stages, with a last lake stage about 8,000 years ago; since then the climate has been dry. The highstand 44,000–37,000 years ago was associated with the formation of Lake Minchin in the Altiplano. The former lakes deposited lacustrine travertine in the area.

== Climate and life ==
A weather station was situated at Salar del Hombre Muerto between 1927 and 1931. The mean temperatures range from 23 °C (73 °F) in summer to 8 °C (46 °F) in winter; the day-night variation is about 20–25 °C (36–45 °F) and maximum temperatures at Salar del Hombre Muerto are about 28 °C (82 °F). The climate is arid; the 60–80 millimetres per year (2.4–3.1 in/year) precipitation originates mainly in the Amazon and comes to the salar during summer, but winter snowfall also occurs.

Algae in the perennial water surfaces draw flamingos, and bunch grass around the salar is grazed by burros and llamas while copepods live in the Salar. Rainbow trouts have been introduced in a stream of the area. Fossil bird footprints have been found in the area as well.

Climate data for Salar del Hombre Muerto (1927–1931)
Month	Jan	Feb	Mar	Apr	May	Jun	Jul	Aug	Sep	Oct	Nov	Dec	Year
Mean daily maximum °C (°F)	19.6 (67.3)	20.1 (68.2)	17.8 (64.0)	12.8 (55.0)	9.9 (49.8)	7.1 (44.8)	6.0 (42.8)	8.4 (47.1)	11.2 (52.2)	16.2 (61.2)	17.7 (63.9)	19.4 (66.9)	13.9 (57.0)
Daily mean °C (°F)	10.9 (51.6)	10.3 (50.5)	8.3 (46.9)	3.9 (39.0)	1.8 (35.2)	−0.6 (30.9)	−2.8 (27.0)	−0.5 (31.1)	1.1 (34.0)	5.9 (42.6)	7.8 (46.0)	9.9 (49.8)	4.7 (40.5)
Mean daily minimum °C (°F)	2.2 (36.0)	0.4 (32.7)	−1.2 (29.8)	0.5 (32.9)	−6.3 (20.7)	−8.3 (17.1)	−11.5 (11.3)	−9.4 (15.1)	−8.9 (16.0)	−4.3 (24.3)	−2.0 (28.4)	0.3 (32.5)	−4.0 (24.8)
Average precipitation mm (inches)	31.4 (1.24)	2.6 (0.10)	1.6 (0.06)	11.0 (0.43)	1.0 (0.04)	4.0 (0.16)	7.5 (0.30)	0.0 (0.0)	0.0 (0.0)	0.0 (0.0)	0.0 (0.0)	4.7 (0.19)	63.8 (2.51)
Average relative humidity (%)	40.0	30.2	27.4	20.0	20.1	22.3	23.0	19.4	16.6	19.5	23.7	31.3	24.5
Source: Secretaria de Mineria

== Human activity ==
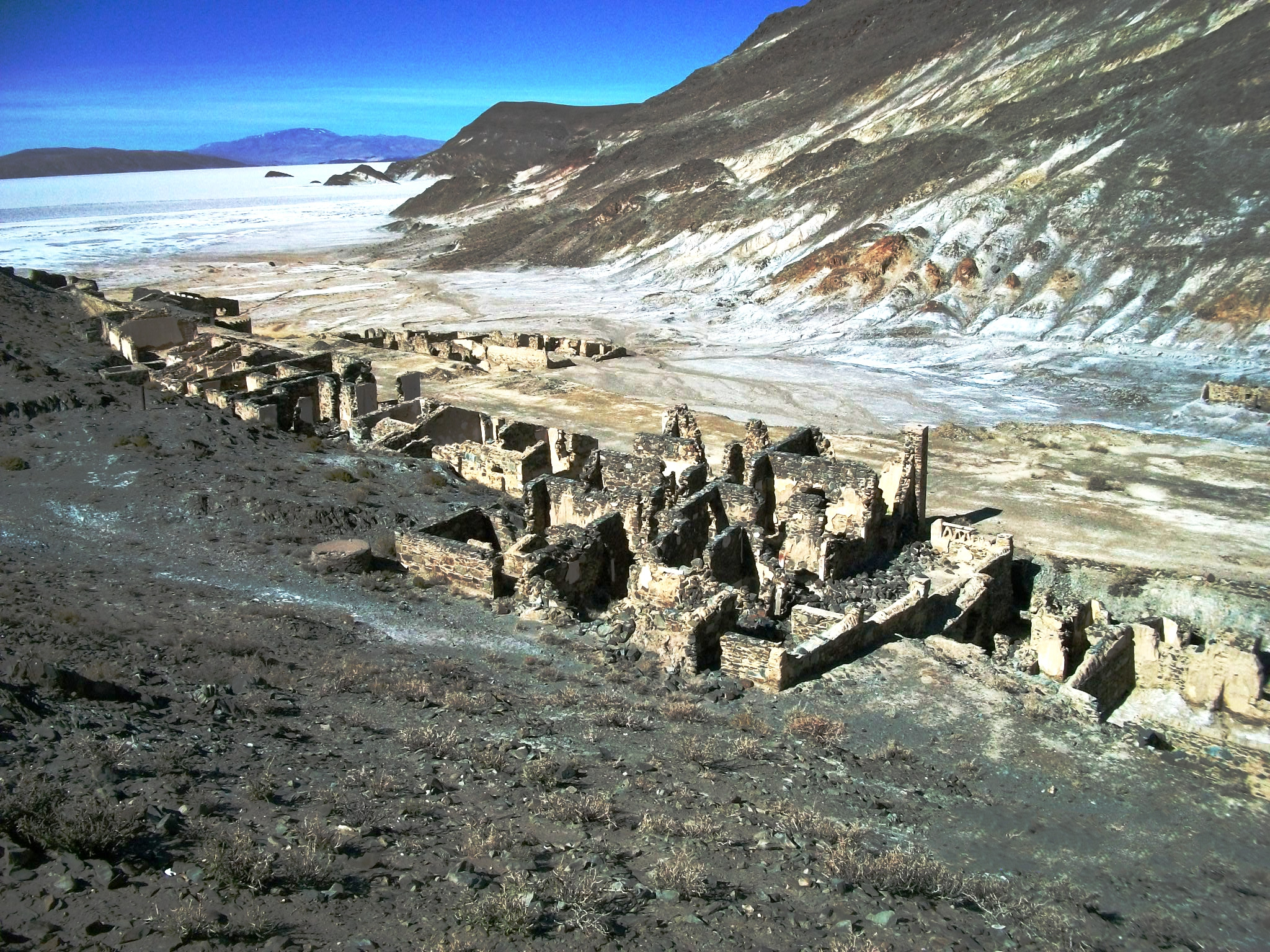
The Incahuasi gold mine

Mining activities began in the 19th century. The Incahuasi gold mine lies on the Incahuasi peninsula of Salar del Hombre Muerto and is associated with two towns built in the 18th century, Nuestra Señora de Loreto de Ingaguasi and Agua Salada. In the past, the area was also used as a source for obsidian; obsidian from Hombre Muerto has been found in Holocene archeological sites at Antofagasta de la Sierra.

The name "Salar del Hombre Muerto" means "Salt Pan of the Dead Man" and may be a reference to the presence of mummies in the area. More recently since the 1990s the Salar del Hombre Muerto has drawn tourists. Lithium extraction began in 1996 or 1997. At Salar del Hombre Muerto there is a brine processing facility, an airfield on the northern area of the salar and a gas pipeline.

=== Mining ===
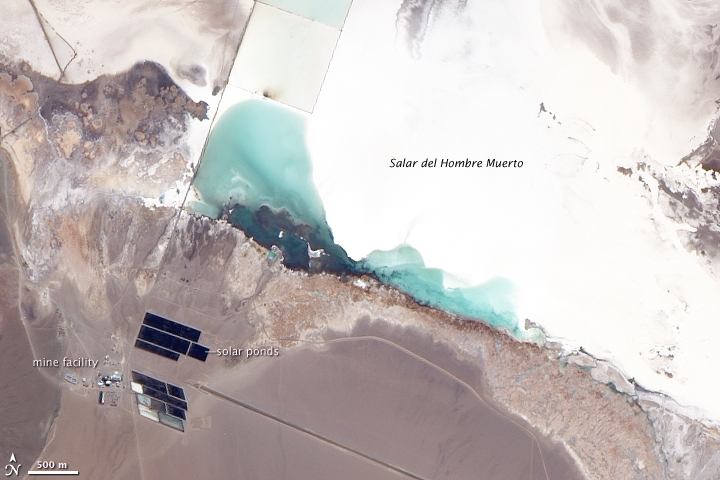
Lithium mine in Salar del Hombre Muerto

As part of the "Proyecto Fénix", the company Arcadium Lithium (before 2018 FMC Lithium, between 2018 and 2024 Livent) obtains lithium from Salar del Hombre Muerto, employing about 110 people and producing about 22500 tons/year equivalents of lithium carbonate; an expansion by about 6000 tons/year was underway in 2021. The lithium-rich brines may have formed through the leaching of pyroclastic rocks; their total amount at Salar del Hombre Muerto is estimated to be 800,000 tons. Another mining project at Salar del Hombre Muerto is called "Sal de Vida"; it is run by Galaxy Resources and was underway as of 2021. The South Korean Pohang Iron and Steel Company is a third company involved at Hombre Muerto.

Together with the Salar de Uyuni and the Salar de Atacama, the Salar del Hombre Muerto defines the "Lithium Triangle" which as of 2009 contains most of the lithium reserves of the world. About 50%–70% of the global lithium supply originates at Salar de Atacama and Salar del Hombre Muerto, the latter of which is one of the most important lithium resources in the world, owing to the high quality of the ore there. Lithium is an important material used during the construction of many electronic devices such as electric cars and other uses related to renewable energy. Lithium resources are viewed as strategic resources in the region, which could be used to facilitate internal development; after some years where a government-run company researched the salt pans the military dictatorship of the National Reorganization Process sold the mining concession of Salar del Hombre Muerto. Boron and potassium are also found at the salar and borates are recovered as a sideproduct; the Tincalayu borax mine lies on the northern margin of the salar. Lithium mining at Hombre Muerto since 1997 is one of the drivers of an increase in mining activity in Argentina, with concomitant consequences such as political conflicts about mining.

The mining activities have raised concerns among the local population about negative environmental impacts and damage to local livelihoods from, e.g., the high water consumption and led to a dispute about the water rights relative to the project with 2024 court rulings suspending new extraction areas, the misuse of and intimidatory behaviour during public consultations on the projects, and other conflict about access rights to a local school and to religious sites.
