= Mining in Portugal =

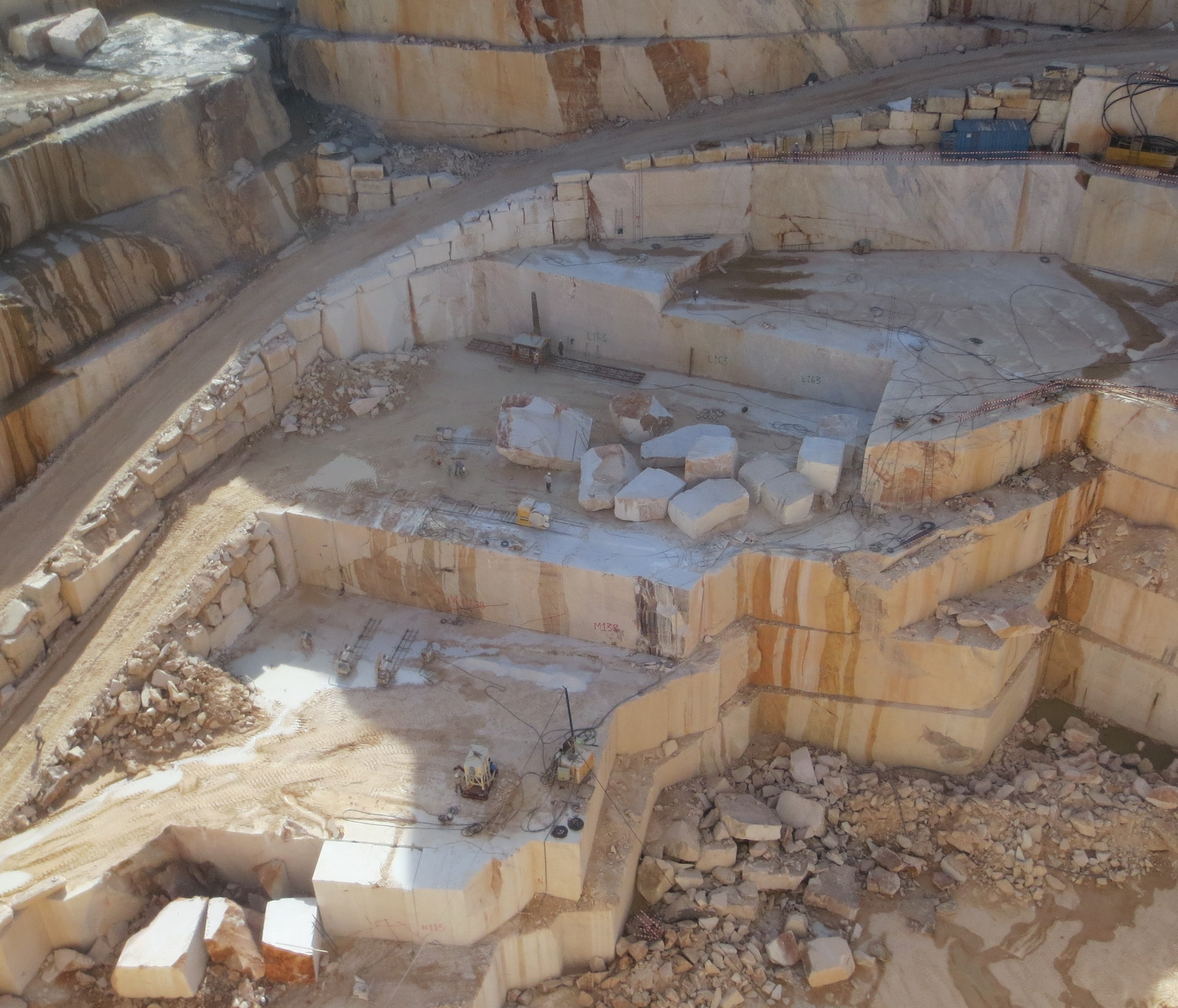
Portugal Quqrry near VILA VIÇOSA

Mining in Portugal is regulated by the Portuguese Ministry of Economy and the Geology and Energy Resources authority under the state-run research institute INETI. Mining activities have continued since the pre-Roman era, when most of the region was known as Lusitania. Gold was once mined. The country remains among the largest European producers of copper and minerals. Portugal's non-ferrous metal ore mining industry had a market size of €580.1 million in 2024, ranking 8th in Europe by revenue.

Portugal is the 7th-largest producer of copper (37,900 tonnes in 2021) and second-largest producer of zinc (160,000 tonnes in 2020) in the European Union, and is also the 10th largest global producer of tungsten and tin. However, the country lacks hydrocarbon exploration potential, as well as iron, aluminium or coal. The most prominent mines in the country are Neves-Corvo, Panasqueira and Mua.

Lithium is another important resource, with new deposits for the battery industry in development, although these are subject to environmental concerns. The state-owned Empresa de Desenvolvimento Mineiro is involved in the environmental rehabilitation of abandoned mines.
