= Lithium mining in Bolivia =

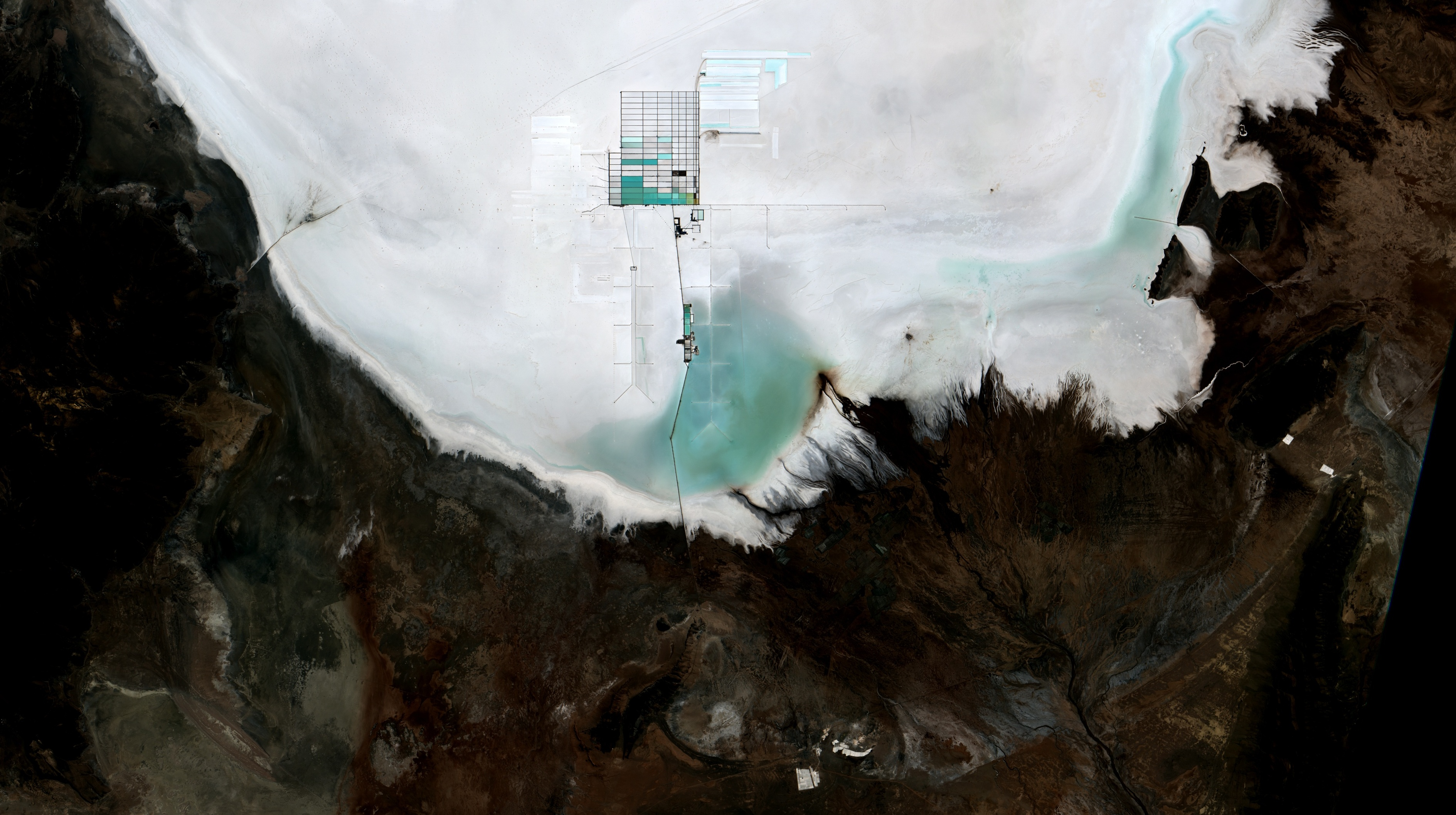
Lithium mine at the Salar de Uyuni salt flat in Bolivia

Lithium mining in Bolivia has the potential to be a critical part of the overall lithium industry due to the large amount of lithium contained within the nation. More than half of the world's known lithium reserves are located in the Lithium Triangle: an area that spans parts of Argentina, Bolivia, and Chile. Bolivia has the world's largest reserves with an estimated twenty-one million metric tons, or twenty percent of the global total. Bolivia makes up less than one percent of global production, while Chile and Argentina produce around forty-five percent.

Several factors contribute to Bolivia's low production. One reason for this is Bolivia's constitutional requirement that all production be state-owned and managed. The state-owned lithium company, Yacimientos de Litio Bolivianos (YLB), has been subject to allegations of corruption and mismanagement. Bolivia also rejected foreign investment, unlike Chile and Argentina. Another issue is the more difficult process of extracting lithium from Bolivian salt flats. Bolivia's lithium reserves have lower concentrations of lithium, higher impurities, and a longer rainy season compared to Chile and Argentina. Its reserves are currently considered uneconomical, which is why the country has not seen substantial success in extracting them.

== History ==
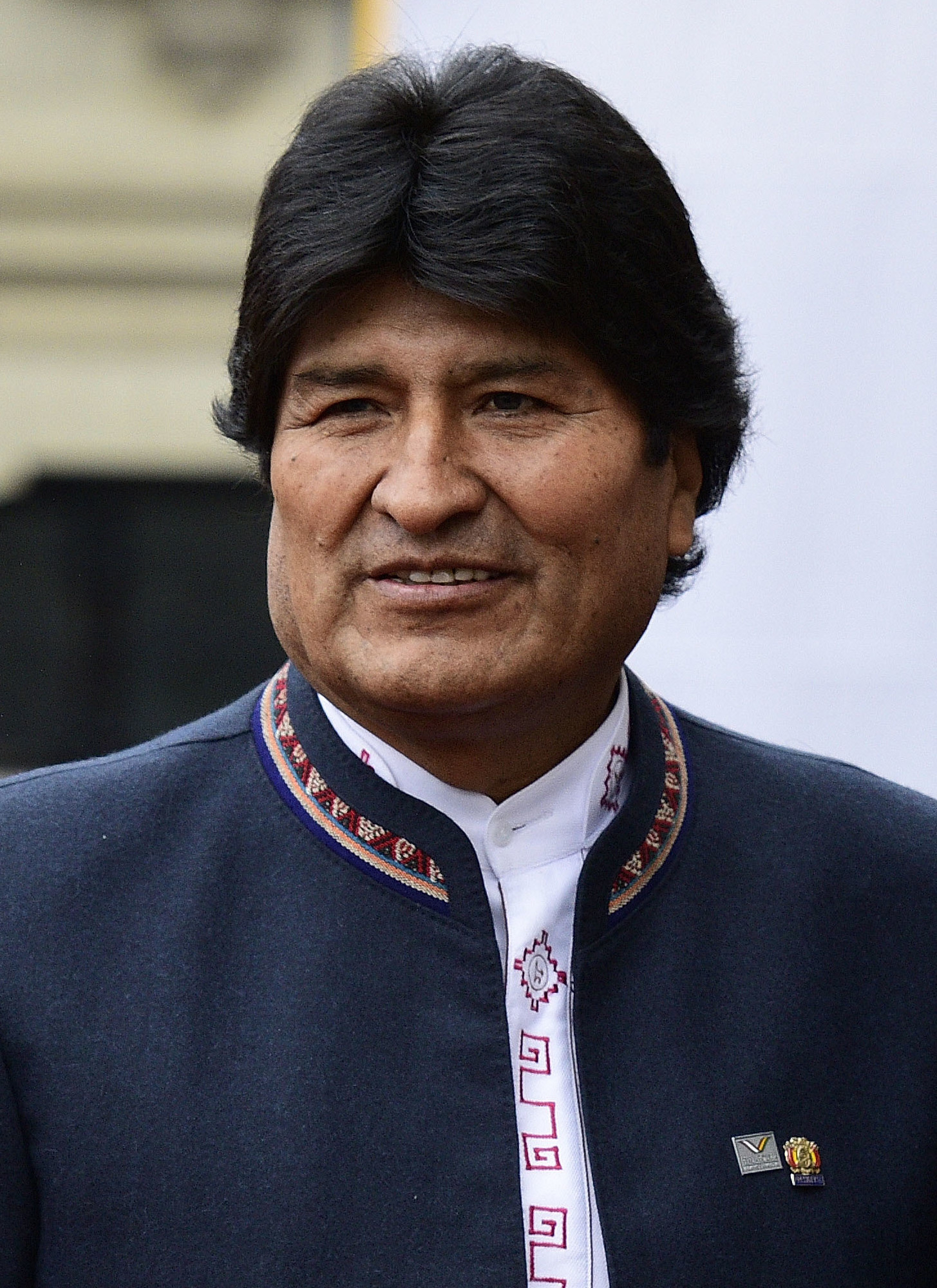
President Morales in 2017

Bolivia has had a history of a prominent mining industry in South America that dates back to the late 19th century, mainly focused on tin and silver. Much of this was done under colonial pressure, the Spanish mining large amounts of silver to bring back to Spain. This natural exploitation, over time, has stuck with Bolivia, becoming somewhat integrated into the memory and national identity of the country. The mining industry was mainly rural, and since the majority of the Bolivian population was rural well into the mid 20th century, miners were vastly unionized on several issues. After the Chaco War, societal and political norms shifted, opening up new avenues for workers and miners alike.

The Cold War also made its way to Bolivia, with the United States CIA stepping in to assassinate USSR-backed Che Guevara while trying to take down the pro-US military government in Bolivia at the time. These events contribute to the reverence of revolutionaries and the mining industry being an integral part of the Bolivian identity, which contributed to both the pride and concern when it came to lithium mining and its challenges throughout the years.

In 1988, the Bolivian government introduced a new, US-backed company called Lithium Corporation (Lithco) that caused mistrust and unrest until the company left in 1993. The company violated several legalities, which caused the lack of trust from citizens.

In 2008, then president Evo Morales announced state control of the lithium industry by the state's lithium company YLB. YLB sought to not only control the lithium mining business in Bolivia, but also produce lithium products such as batteries and be able to participate with these lithium products globally. YLB has struggled to increase production, while attempts to work with private foreign companies, such as a 2018 deal with the German company ASISA, have been hindered by protests.

Morales had high hopes concerning lithium mining within Bolivia, believing that if the industry thrived in the country, it would result in great amounts of financial support for Bolivians and aid the country's economy. Morales's vice president, Álvaro García Linera, claimed that lithium would help 40% of Bolivians by providing scientific and technological jobs that are everywhere across the globe. Government policy advocated for Bolivians owning all of lithium mining within the country, but this did not happen.

Former Bolivian president Luis Arce was more supportive of foreign investment than Morales and explored collaboration with outsiders, despite opposition. In 2023, YLB made a deal with the Chinese battery company CATL to allow for the further industrialization of the industry. YLB is in talks with companies from the US, China, and Russia.

Rodrigo Paz, current Bolivian president, campaigned on a free-market approach within Bolivia and promised to move away from the past economic system, which mainly situated itself within the oil and natural gas mining industries. This is in contrast to the views and policies of Evo Morales and Luis Arce, and signals a more conservative approach to politics.

== Production ==
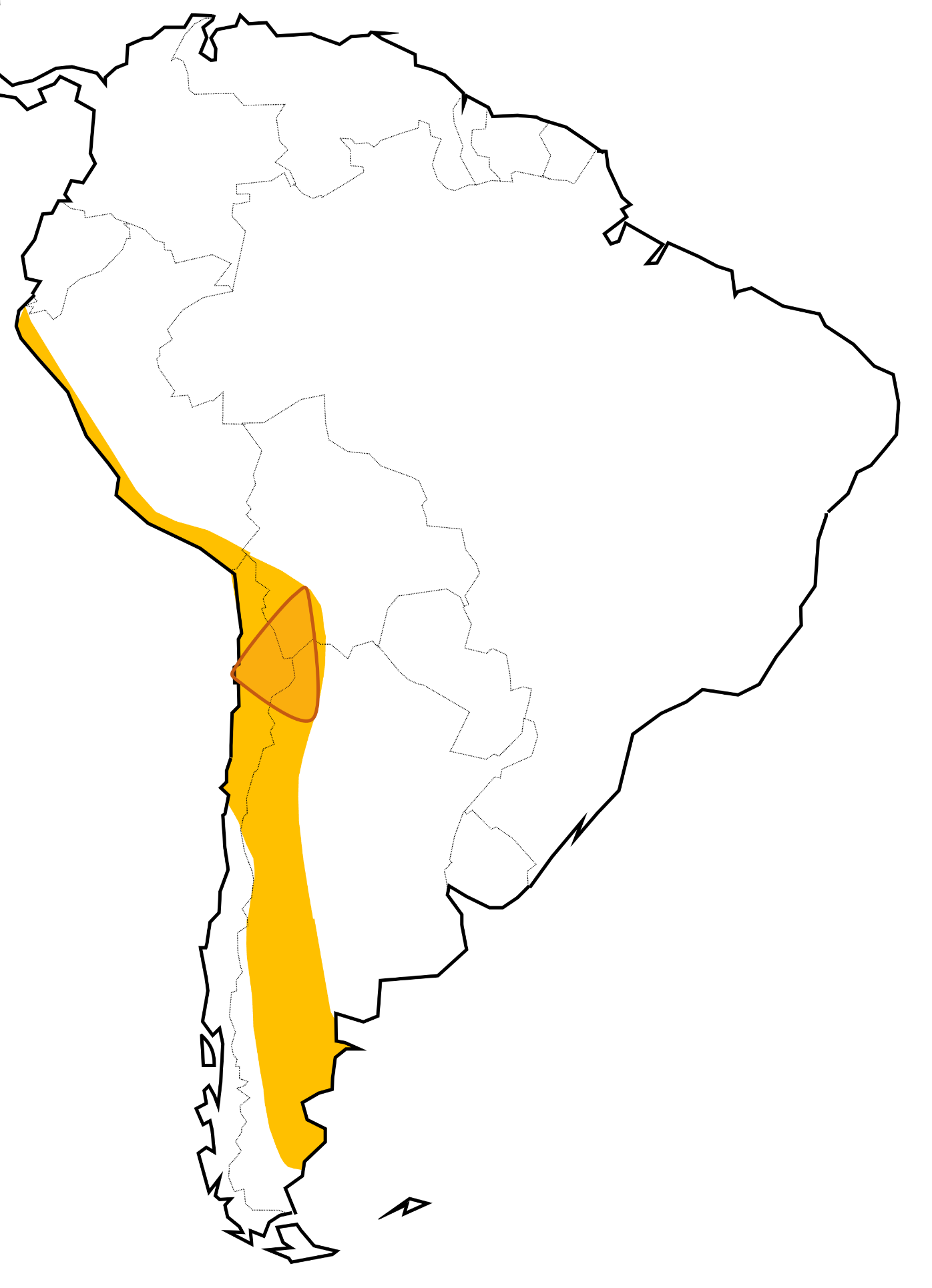
The Lithium Triangle

Lithium mining takes place in the Lithium Triangle, which is located high in the Andean mountains shared in Bolivia, Argentina, and Chile. This area is called the Atacama Desert, known for being the driest desert in the world. Hundreds of salt flats, due to lakes in the areas drying up over time, are located within these three countries, Bolivia containing almost 40 salt flats alone. Lithium extraction requires a substantial amount of water, which has led to water shortages near the mines. Sixty-five percent of the water supply in the Lithium Triangle has been consumed by extraction.

Demand for lithium has grown in the past several years with the shift towards renewable energy, with other countries like Canada and Australia also participating alongside the nations that make up the Lithium Triangle to produce enough lithium to keep up with demand. Lithium extraction in the Bolivian salt flats, namely Salar de Uyuni, has slow progress being made due to different struggles with both economics and technology in the region.

== Impact ==
The lithium mining industry in Bolivia is controversial for several reasons, some being concern for the environment as well as poor project management and social conflict and attitude, both local to the mining and throughout the Bolivian nation. Substantial amounts of water are used in this process, causing both water shortages and drought for farmers and their crops. In Argentina and Chile, two countries that, unlike Bolivia, have seen success in harnessing their reserves, water shortages have caused severe harm to wildlife, especially flamingos, and indigenous populations. In the region as a whole, air, soil, and water are contaminated due to the local lithium extraction.

== See also ==
- List of countries by lithium production
- Mining in Bolivia
- Lithium mining in Australia
- Lithium mining in Chile
- Lithium mines in Argentina:
  - Salar de Olaroz mine
  - Salinas Grandes mine
- Rainy season in the Altiplano
