= Salar de Uyuni mine =

Lithium mine in Potosí, Bolivia

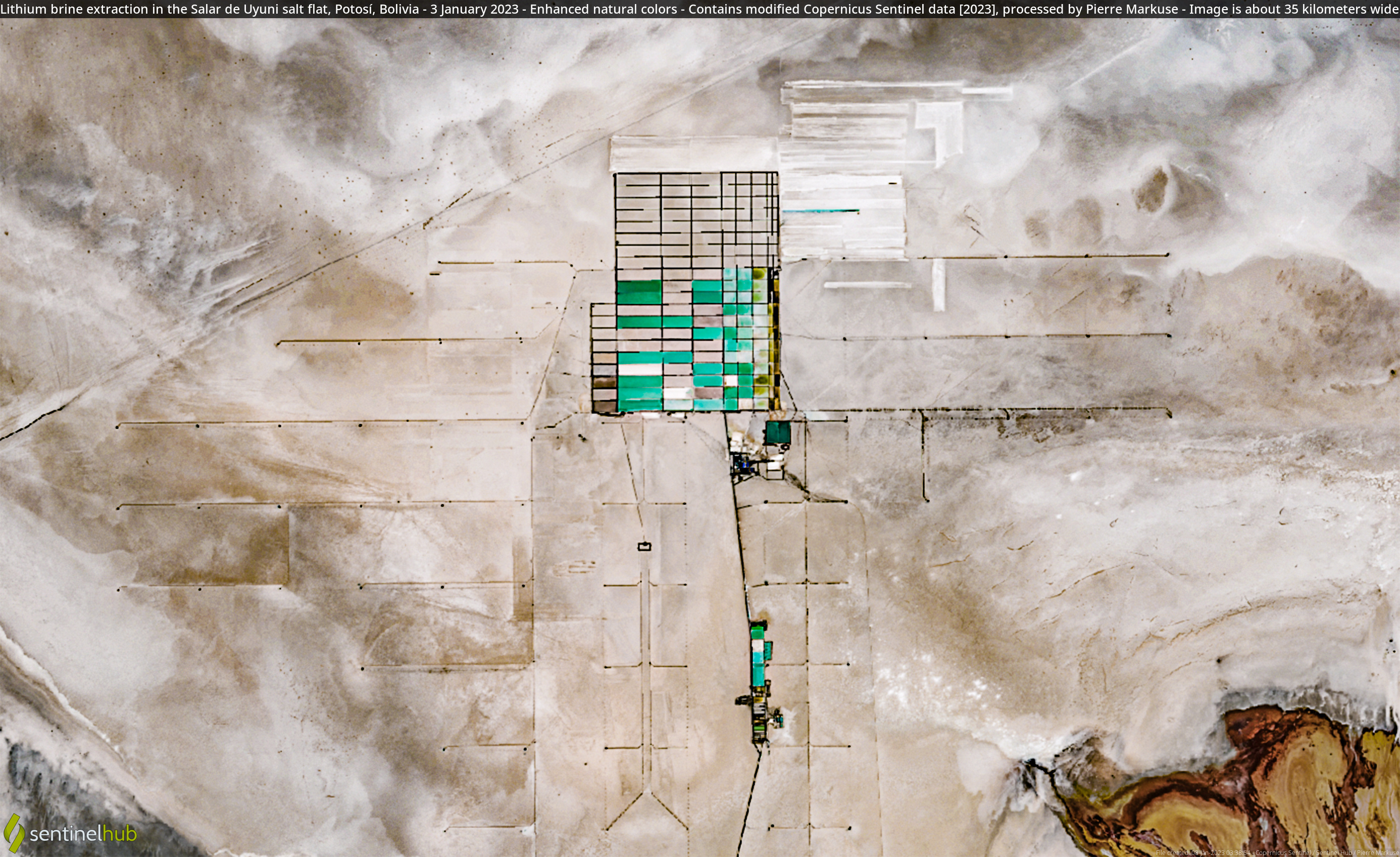
- Satellite view of the Salar de Uyuni lithium extraction field
- Location: Uyuni, Potosí Department, Bolivia
- Products: Lithium

The Salar de Uyuni mine is a lithium mine in Bolivia located in the Salar de Uyuni salt flat, within Bolivia's Potosí Department. The facility was established by the state-owned Mining Corporation of Bolivia in January of 2013 at a cost of $19 million.
