= Nova Andino Litio =

Lithium mining company

- Type: Private – SpA
- Industry: Metals and mining
- Founded: 29 December 2025
- Headquarters: Santiago, Chile
- Area served: South America
- Key people: Carlos Díaz (general manager); Eduardo Foix (finance manager)
- Production output: ▲233,000 metric tonnes lithium carbonate (2025)
- Net income: US$588 million (2025)
- Owner: Codelco; Sociedad Química y Minera: Tianqi Lithium (23.77%)
- Parent: Codelco

Nova Andino Litio is a public–private lithium mining company based in Chile. It is a joint venture of state-owned Codelco and Sociedad Química y Minera (SQM) which is owned in 23.77% by Tianqi Lithium. The company mines lithium-rich brines in Salar de Atacama in northern Chile.

== Creation ==
The company was created following negotiations between Codelco and SQM that begun in 2023 when President Gabriel Boric announced the National Lithium Strategy. In detail the Nova Andino Litio emerged in December 27, 2025 from SQM's daughter company Salar which absorbed Codelco's daughter company Minera Tarar and then changed name to Nova Andino Litio. All of these last three companies are of SpA type. In late January 2026 the Supreme Court of Chile rejected an objection to the merger by Tianqi Lithium, a major shareholder in SQM. The association of the Chilean state with SQM has attracted criticism for SQM's history of corruption.

== Structure ==
In the agreement that created Nova Andino Litio Codelco maintains control of the assets while SQM runs the operation in Salar de Atacama. The board of directors is made of three representatives each of Codelco and SQM. As of December 2025 Nova Andino Litio had a general manager from SQM and a financial manager from Codelco. The setup of the company gives the Chilean state most of the income of the company in the form of an approximate 70% of the operating margin "associated with new production". Beginning in 2031 the Chilean state is expected to obtain 85% of the operating margin associated with new production. This last mentioned income is divided between taxes, payments to Corfo and profits for Codelco. The agreement is set to last until 2060 at which point the Chilean state could seek new partners for lithium mining in SQM's former concession in Salar de Atacama.
