= List of countries by lithium production =

This is a list of countries by lithium mine production from 2018 onwards.

== Current data ==
- Lithium Triangle state

List of countries by lithium production in 2022–24 (tonnes)
Country	Production	Reserves	Resources
World	240,000	30,000,000	115,000,000
Australia	88,000	7,000,000	8,900,000
Chile	49,000	9,300,000	11,000,000
China	41,000	3,000,000	6,800,000
Zimbabwe	22,000	480,000	860,000
Argentina	18,000	4,000,000	23,000,000
Brazil	10,000	390,000	1,300,000
Canada	4,300	1,200,000	5,700,000
Namibia	2,700	14,000	230,000
United States	2,440	1,800,000	19,000,000
Bolivia	733	–	23,000,000
Portugal	380	60,000	270,000
Nigeria	132	–	–
Other countries	–	2,800,000	–
Germany	–	–	4,000,000
DR Congo	–	–	3,000,000
Mexico	–	–	1,700,000
Czech Republic	–	–	1,300,000
Mali	–	–	1,200,000
Serbia	–	–	1,200,000
Peru	–	–	1,000,000
Russia	–	–	1,000,000
Spain	–	–	320,000
Ghana	–	–	200,000
Austria	–	–	60,000
Finland	–	–	55,000
Kazakhstan	–	–	45,000

== Historical data ==
- Lithium Triangle state

Lithium mine production (tonnes)
Rank	Country	2024	2023	2022	2021	2020	2019	2018
1	Australia (Note: A 2023 estimate suggests that lithium production in Australia will hit a cap of 1.2 million tonnes (2.6 billion pounds) of lithium carbonate equivalent by 2030, and that the country will by then remain the top producer but with a smaller proportion of the world's production compared with 2023.)	88,000	86,000	61,000	55,000	39,700	45,000	51,000
2	Chile	49,000	44,000	39,000	26,000	21,500	19,300	16,000
3	China	41,000	33,000	19,000	14,000	13,300	10,800	8,000
4	Argentina	18,000	9,600	6,200	6,200	5,900	6,300	6,200
5	United States	—N/a	—N/a	—N/a	5,000 (Note: The United States Geological Survey (USGS) publishes research and information yearly regarding the production and reserve statistics of minerals globally. However, production figures for the United States is withheld, reportedly “to avoid disclosing company proprietary data.” Furthermore there is only one Lithium mine in the United States, located in Nevada. It is reported to produce 5,000 tonnes of Lithium per year.)	—N/a	—N/a	—N/a
6	Brazil	10,000	4,900	2,200	1,500	1,420	2,400	600
7	Zimbabwe	22,000	3,400	800	1,200	417	1,200	1,600
8	Portugal	380	380	600	900	348	900	800
9	Bolivia	—N/a	—N/a	—N/a	540	700		—N/a
10	Canada	4,300	3,400	500	—N/a	—N/a	200	2,400
11	Namibia	2,700	—N/a	—N/a	—N/a	—N/a	—N/a	500

== See also ==
- Lithium Triangle
