= Lithium =

Lithium, _{3}Li
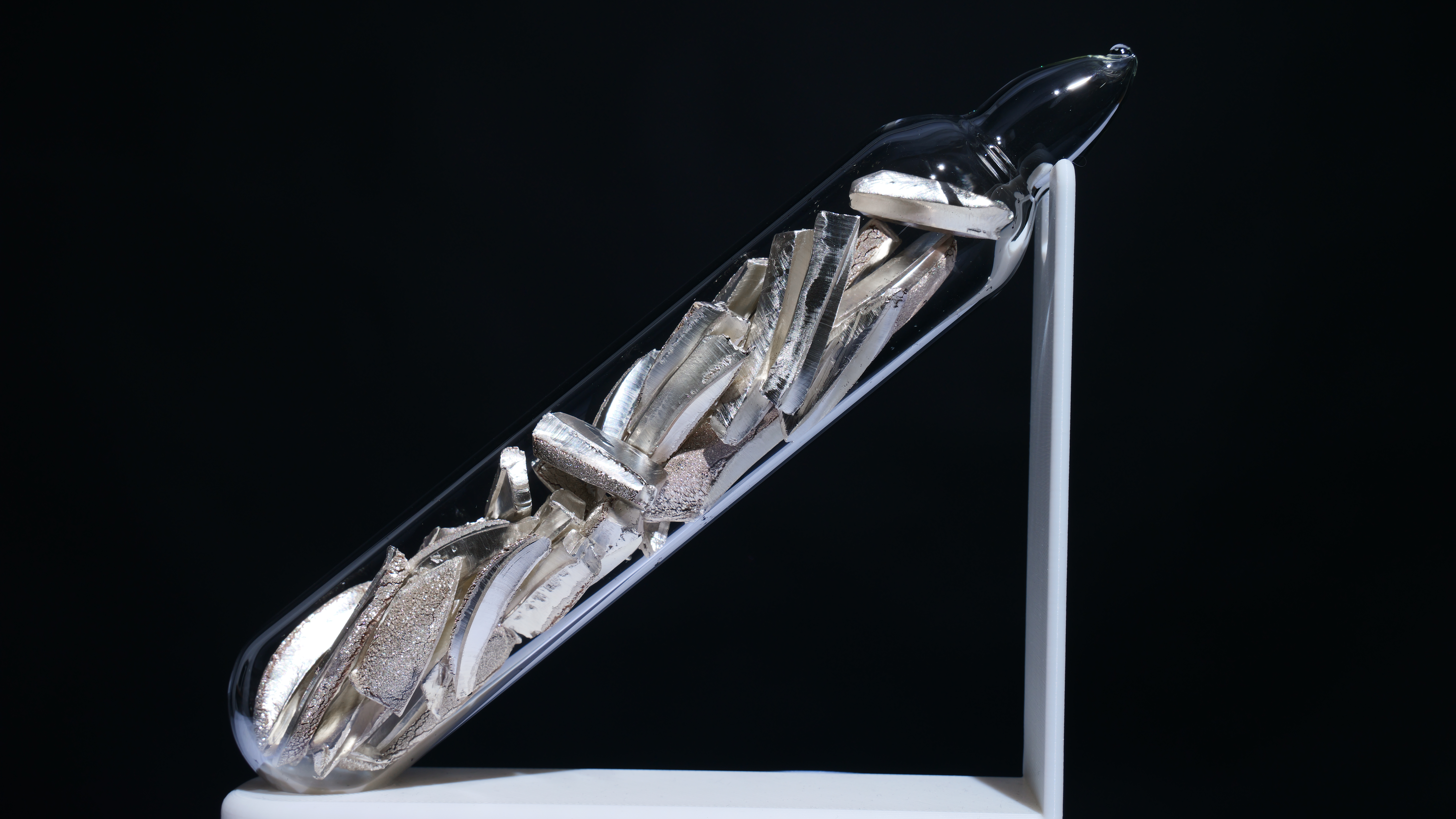
- Chunks of pure lithium metal sealed in a glass ampoule

Lithium
- Pronunciation: /ˈlɪθiəm/ (LITH-ee-əm)
- Appearance: silvery-white

Standard atomic weight A_{r}°(Li)
- [6.938, 6.997]; 6.94±0.06 (abridged)

Lithium in the periodic table
Hydrogen																															Helium
Lithium	Beryllium																									Boron	Carbon	Nitrogen	Oxygen	Fluorine	Neon
Sodium	Magnesium																									Aluminium	Silicon	Phosphorus	Sulfur	Chlorine	Argon
Potassium	Calcium															Scandium	Titanium	Vanadium	Chromium	Manganese	Iron	Cobalt	Nickel	Copper	Zinc	Gallium	Germanium	Arsenic	Selenium	Bromine	Krypton
Rubidium	Strontium															Yttrium	Zirconium	Niobium	Molybdenum	Technetium	Ruthenium	Rhodium	Palladium	Silver	Cadmium	Indium	Tin	Antimony	Tellurium	Iodine	Xenon
Caesium	Barium	Lanthanum	Cerium	Praseodymium	Neodymium	Promethium	Samarium	Europium	Gadolinium	Terbium	Dysprosium	Holmium	Erbium	Thulium	Ytterbium	Lutetium	Hafnium	Tantalum	Tungsten	Rhenium	Osmium	Iridium	Platinum	Gold	Mercury (element)	Thallium	Lead	Bismuth	Polonium	Astatine	Radon
Francium	Radium	Actinium	Thorium	Protactinium	Uranium	Neptunium	Plutonium	Americium	Curium	Berkelium	Californium	Einsteinium	Fermium	Mendelevium	Nobelium	Lawrencium	Rutherfordium	Dubnium	Seaborgium	Bohrium	Hassium	Meitnerium	Darmstadtium	Roentgenium	Copernicium	Nihonium	Flerovium	Moscovium	Livermorium	Tennessine	Oganesson
H
↑
Li
↓
Na
helium ← lithium → beryllium
- Atomic number (Z): 3
- Group: group 1: hydrogen and alkali metals
- Period: period 2
- Block: s-block
- Electron configuration: [He] 2s^{1}
- Electrons per shell: 2, 1

Physical properties
- Phase at STP: solid
- Melting point: 453.65 K (180.50 °C, 356.90 °F)
- Boiling point: 1617 K (1344 °C, 2451 °F)
- Density (at 20° C): 0.5334 g/cm^{3}
- when liquid (at m.p.): 0.512 g/cm^{3}
- Critical point: 3220 K, 67 MPa (extrapolated)
- Heat of fusion: 3.00 kJ/mol
- Heat of vaporization: 136 kJ/mol
- Molar heat capacity: 24.860 J/(mol·K)
- Specific heat capacity: 3582.133 J/(kg·K)
Vapor pressure
P (Pa)	1	10	100	1 k	10 k	100 k
at T (K)	797	885	995	1144	1337	1610

Atomic properties
- Oxidation states: common: +1 −1
- Electronegativity: Pauling scale: 0.98
- Ionization energies: 1st: 520.2 kJ/mol; 2nd: 7298.1 kJ/mol; 3rd: 11815.0 kJ/mol
- Atomic radius: empirical: 152 pm calculated: 167 pm
- Covalent radius: 128±7 pm
- Van der Waals radius: 182 pm
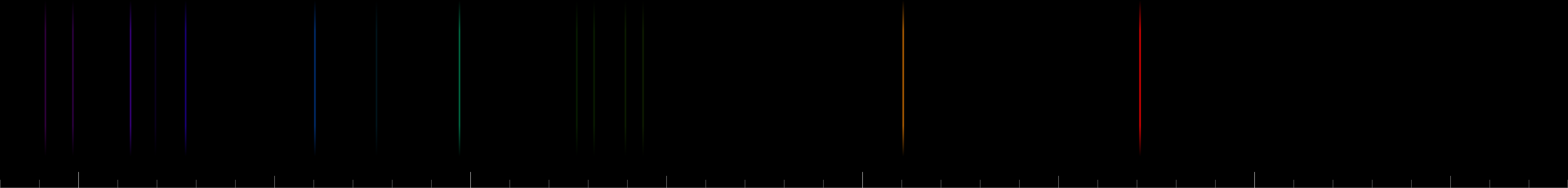
- Spectral lines of lithium

Other properties
- Natural occurrence: primordial
- Crystal structure: body-centered cubic (bcc) (cI2)
- Lattice constant: a = 350.93 pm (at 20 °C)
- Thermal expansion: 46.56×10^{−6}/K (at 20 °C)
- Thermal conductivity: 84.8 W/(m⋅K)
- Electrical resistivity: 92.8 nΩ⋅m (at 20 °C)
- Magnetic ordering: paramagnetic
- Molar magnetic susceptibility: +14.2×10^{−6} cm^{3}/mol (298 K)
- Young's modulus: 4.9 GPa
- Shear modulus: 4.2 GPa
- Bulk modulus: 11 GPa
- Speed of sound thin rod: 6000 m/s (at 20 °C)
- Mohs hardness: 0.6
- Brinell hardness: 5 MPa
- CAS Number: 7439-93-2

History
- Naming: from the Greek word λιθoς, stone
- Discovery: Johan August Arfwedson (1817)
- First isolation: William Thomas Brande (1821)

Isotopes of lithium
Main isotopes			Decay	
Isotope	abundance	half-life (t_{1/2})	mode	product
^{6}Li	[1.9%, 7.8%]	stable		
^{7}Li	[92.2%, 98.1%]	stable		
Significant variation occurs in commercial samples because of the wide distribution of samples depleted in ^{6}Li.

Lithium (from Ancient Greek: λίθος, líthos, 'stone') is a chemical element; it has symbol Li and atomic number 3. It is a soft, silvery-white alkali metal. Under standard conditions, it is the least dense metal and the least dense solid element due to its low atomic mass and large atomic radius. Like all alkali metals, lithium is highly reactive and flammable, and must be stored in vacuum, inert atmosphere, or inert liquid such as purified kerosene or mineral oil. It exhibits a metallic luster when pure, but quickly corrodes in air to a dull silvery gray, then black tarnish. It does not occur freely in nature, but occurs mainly as pegmatitic minerals, which were once the main source of lithium. Due to its solubility as an ion, it is present in ocean water and is commonly obtained from brines. Lithium metal is isolated electrolytically from a mixture of lithium chloride and potassium chloride.

The nucleus of the lithium atom verges on instability, since the two stable lithium isotopes found in nature have among the lowest binding energies per nucleon of all stable nuclides. Because of its relative nuclear instability, lithium is less common in the Solar System than 28 of the first 34 chemical elements even though its nuclei are very light: it is an exception to the trend that heavier nuclei are less common. For related reasons, lithium has important uses in nuclear physics. The transmutation of lithium atoms to helium in 1932 was the first fully human-made nuclear reaction, and lithium deuteride serves as a fusion fuel in staged thermonuclear weapons.

Lithium and its compounds have several industrial applications, including heat-resistant glass and ceramics, lithium grease lubricants, flux additives for iron, steel and aluminium production, lithium metal batteries, and lithium-ion batteries. Batteries alone consume more than three-quarters of lithium production.

Lithium is present in biological systems in trace amounts. Lithium-based drugs are useful as a mood stabilizer and antidepressant in the treatment of mental illness such as bipolar disorder.

== Properties ==
=== Atomic and physical ===
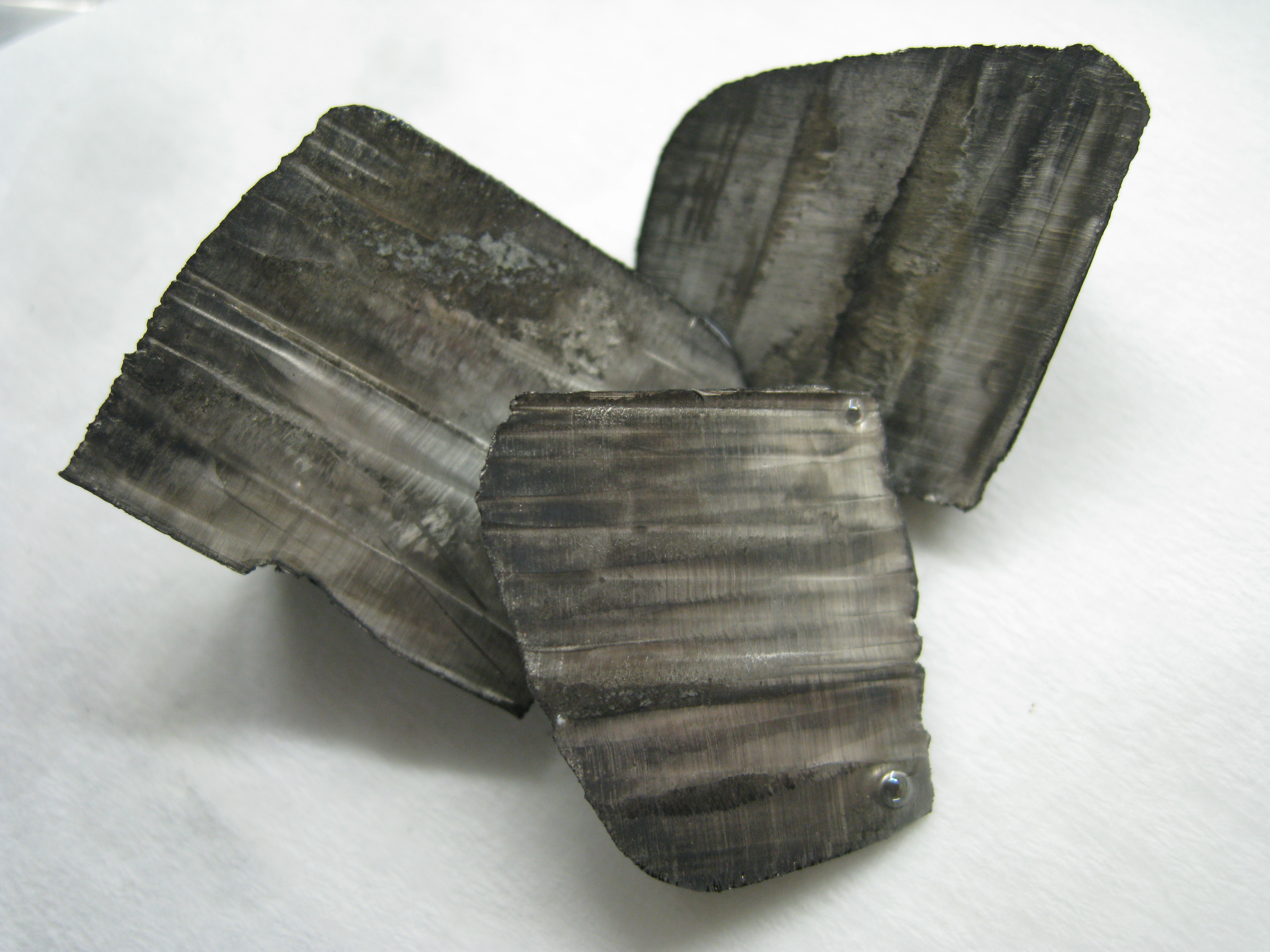
Lithium ingots with a thin layer of black nitride tarnish

The alkali metals are also called the lithium family, after its leading element. Like the other alkali metals (which are sodium (Na), potassium (K), rubidium (Rb), caesium (Cs), and francium (Fr)), lithium has a single valence electron that, in the presence of solvents, is easily released to form Li^{+}. Because of this, lithium is a good conductor of heat and electricity as well as being chemically reactive, though it is the least reactive of the alkali metals. Lithium's lower reactivity is due to the proximity of its valence electron to its nucleus (the remaining two electrons are in the 1s orbital, much lower in energy, and do not participate in chemical bonds). Molten lithium is significantly more reactive than its solid form.

Lithium metal is soft enough to be cut with a knife. It is silvery-white. In air it oxidizes to lithium oxide. Its melting point of 180.50 °C (453.65 K; 356.90 °F) and its boiling point of 1,342 °C (1,615 K; 2,448 °F) are each the highest of all the alkali metals.

Lithium has the lowest density (0.534 g/cm^{3}) of all metals under standard conditions. Lithium can float on the lightest hydrocarbon oils and is one of only three metals that can float on water, the other two being sodium and potassium.

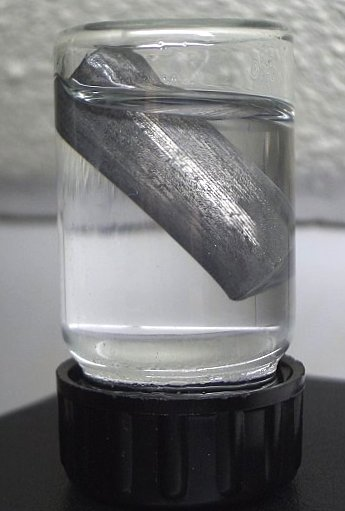
Lithium floating in oil

Lithium's coefficient of thermal expansion is twice that of aluminium and almost four times that of iron. Lithium is superconductive below 400 μK at standard pressure and at higher temperatures (more than 9 K) at very high pressures (>20 GPa). At temperatures below 70 K, lithium, like sodium, undergoes diffusionless phase change transformations. At 4.2 K it has a rhombohedral crystal system (with a nine-layer repeat spacing); at higher temperatures it transforms to face-centered cubic and then body-centered cubic. At liquid-helium temperatures (4 K) the rhombohedral structure is prevalent. Multiple allotropic forms have been identified for lithium at high pressures.

Lithium has a mass specific heat capacity of 3.58 kilojoules per kilogram-kelvin, the highest of all solids. Because of this, lithium metal is often used in coolants for heat transfer applications.

=== Isotopes ===
Naturally occurring lithium is composed of two stable isotopes, ^{6}Li and ^{7}Li, the latter being the more abundant (95.15% natural abundance). Both natural isotopes have anomalously low nuclear binding energy per nucleon (compared to the neighboring elements on the periodic table, helium and beryllium); lithium is the only low numbered element that can produce net energy through nuclear fission. The two lithium nuclei have lower binding energies per nucleon than any other stable nuclides other than hydrogen-1, deuterium and helium-3. As a result of this, though very light in atomic weight, lithium is less common in the Solar System than 28 of the first 34 chemical elements. Seven radioisotopes have been characterized, the most stable being ^{8}Li with a half-life of 838 ms and ^{9}Li with a half-life of 178 ms. All of the remaining radioactive isotopes have half-lives that are shorter than 8.6 ms. The shortest-lived isotope is ^{4}Li, which decays through proton emission and has a half-life of 7.6 × 10^{−23} s. The ^{6}Li isotope is one of only five stable nuclides to have both an odd number of protons and an odd number of neutrons, the other four stable odd-odd nuclides being hydrogen-2, boron-10, nitrogen-14, and tantalum-180m.

Lithium isotopes fractionate substantially during a wide variety of natural processes, including mineral formation (chemical precipitation), metabolism, and ion exchange. Lithium ions substitute for magnesium and iron in octahedral sites in clay minerals, where ^{6}Li is preferred to ^{7}Li, resulting in enrichment of the light isotope in processes of hyperfiltration and rock alteration. The exotic ^{11}Li is known to exhibit a neutron halo, with 2 neutrons orbiting around its nucleus of 3 protons and 6 neutrons. The process known as laser isotope separation can be used to separate lithium isotopes, in particular ^{7}Li from ^{6}Li.

Nuclear weapons manufacture and other nuclear physics applications are a major source of artificial lithium fractionation, with the light isotope ^{6}Li being retained by industry and military stockpiles to such an extent that it has caused slight but measurable change in the ^{6}Li to ^{7}Li ratios in natural sources, such as rivers. This has led to unusual uncertainty in the standardized atomic weight, since this quantity depends on the natural abundance ratios of these naturally occurring stable lithium isotopes, as they are available in commercial lithium mineral sources.

Both stable isotopes can be laser cooled and were used to produce the first quantum degenerate Bose–Fermi mixture.

== Occurrence ==
=== Astronomical ===
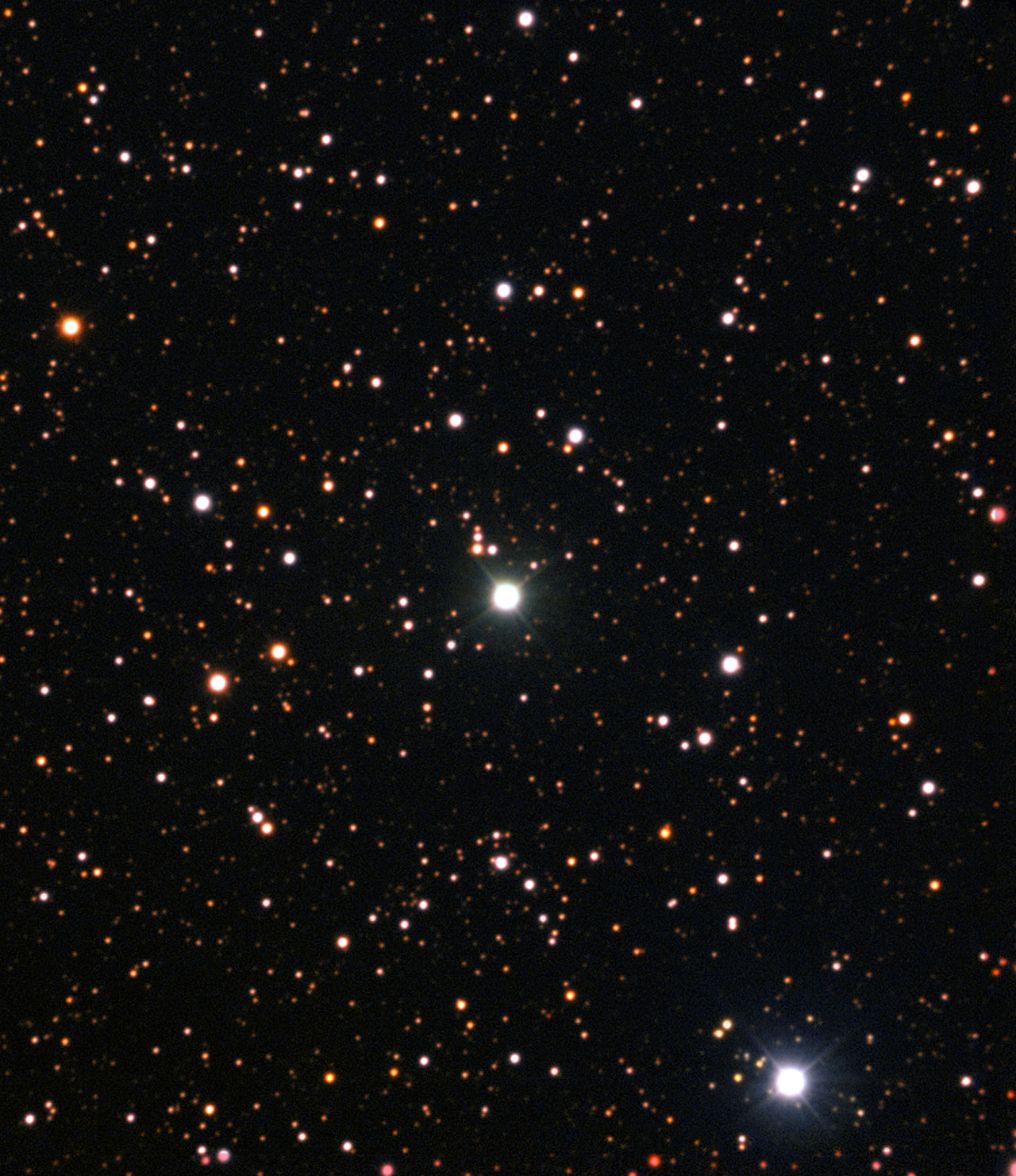
Nova Centauri 2013, a stellar nova from which lithium was detected

Lithium-7 was created in nuclear reactions very early in the history of the universe, in a process called Big Bang nucleosynthesis. The relative amount was small compared to isotopes of hydrogen and helium. The only other element created was beryllium-7 which decayed into lithium-7. Measured lithium abundance does not match the nucleosynthesis model well, an issue called "cosmological lithium problem"; whether this is due to issues in the difficult experimental measurements or in aspects of the theory is not known. Measurements of primordial lithium abundance are complicated because lithium-7 can be created and destroyed in cosmic ray, classical nova, and supernova reactions, and inside stars. The only known mechanism to produce lithium-6 is via cosmic-ray interactions.

Lithium is also found in brown dwarf substellar objects. Because lithium is present in cooler, less-massive brown dwarfs, but is destroyed in hotter red dwarf stars, its presence in the stars' spectra can be used in the lithium test to differentiate them. Certain red giant stars can also contain a high concentration. Many different causes have been proposed for this lithium, including pulling lithium from companion stars.

=== Terrestrial ===
Lithium is about as common as chlorine in the Earth's upper continental crust, on a per-atom basis.

Although lithium is widely distributed on Earth, it does not naturally occur in elemental form due to its high reactivity. The total lithium content of seawater is very large and is estimated as 230 billion tonnes, where the element exists at a relatively constant concentration of 0.14 to 0.25 parts per million (ppm), or 25 micromolar; higher concentrations approaching 7 ppm are found near hydrothermal vents.

Estimates for the Earth's crustal content range from 20 to 70 ppm by weight. In keeping with its name, lithium forms a minor part of igneous rocks, with the largest concentrations in granites. Granitic pegmatites also provide the greatest abundance, with spodumene and petalite being the most commercially viable sources. Another significant mineral is lepidolite which is now an obsolete name for a series formed by polylithionite and trilithionite. Another source for lithium is hectorite clay, the only active development of which is through the Western Lithium Corporation in the United States. At 20 mg lithium per kg of Earth's crust, lithium is the 31st most abundant element.

According to the Handbook of Lithium and Natural Calcium, "Lithium is a comparatively rare element, although it is found in many rocks and some brines, but always in very low concentrations. There are a fairly large number of both lithium mineral and brine deposits but only comparatively few of them are of actual or potential commercial value. Many are very small, others are too low in grade."

Chile was estimated (2020) to have the largest reserves, 9.2 million tonnes (Mt), and Australia the highest annual production (40,000 tonnes). One of the largest reserve bases (Note: Appendixes. By USGS definitions, the reserve base "may encompass those parts of the resources that have a reasonable potential for becoming economically available within planning horizons beyond those that assume proven technology and current economics. The reserve base includes those resources that are currently economic (reserves), marginally economic (marginal reserves), and some of those that are currently subeconomic (subeconomic resources).") of lithium is in the Salar de Uyuni area of Bolivia, which has 5.4 Mt. Other major suppliers include Argentina and China. As of 2015, the Czech Geological Survey considered the entire Ore Mountains in the Czech Republic as lithium province. Five deposits are registered, one near Cínovec is considered as a potentially economical deposit, with 160 000 tonnes. In December 2019, Finnish mining company Keliber Oy reported its Rapasaari lithium deposit has estimated proven and probable ore reserves of 5.280 Mt.

In June 2010, The New York Times reported that American geologists were conducting ground surveys on dry salt lakes in western Afghanistan believing that large deposits are located there. These estimates are "based principally on old data, which was gathered mainly by the Soviets during their occupation of Afghanistan from 1979–1989". The Department of Defense estimated the lithium reserves in Afghanistan to amount to the ones in Bolivia and dubbed it as a potential "Saudi-Arabia of lithium". In Cornwall, England, the presence of brine rich in lithium was well known due to the region's historic mining industry, and private investors have conducted tests to investigate potential lithium extraction in this area.

=== Biological ===
Lithium is found in trace amount in numerous plants, plankton, and invertebrates, at concentrations of 69 to 5,760 parts per billion (ppb). In vertebrates the concentration is slightly lower, and nearly all vertebrate tissue and body fluids contain lithium ranging from 21 to 763 ppb. Marine organisms tend to bioaccumulate lithium more than terrestrial organisms. Whether lithium has a physiological role in any of these organisms is unknown. Lithium concentrations in human tissue averages about 24 ppb (4 ppb in blood, and 1.3 ppm in bone).

Plants gradually absorb lithium from the soil.

Lithium is easily absorbed by plants and lithium concentration in plant tissue is typically around 1 ppm. Some plant families bioaccumulate more lithium than others. Dry weight lithium concentrations for members of the family Solanaceae (which includes potatoes and tomatoes), for instance, can be as high as 30 ppm while this can be as low as 0.05 ppb for corn grains. Studies in mineral-rich soil give concentration ranges between around 0.1 and 50−100 ppm, with some concentrations as high as 100−400 ppm, although it is unlikely that all of it is available for uptake by plants. Lithium accumulation does not appear to affect the essential nutrient composition of plants. Tolerance to lithium varies by plant species and typically parallels sodium tolerance; maize and Rhodes grass, for example, are highly tolerant to lithium injury while avocado and soybean are very sensitive. Similarly, lithium at concentrations of 5 ppm reduces seed germination in some species (e.g. Asian rice and chickpea) but not in others (e.g. barley and wheat).

Many of lithium's major biological effects can be explained by its competition with other ions. The monovalent lithium ion Li^{+} competes with other ions such as sodium (immediately below lithium on the periodic table), which like lithium is also a monovalent alkali metal. Lithium also competes with bivalent magnesium ions, whose ionic radius (86 pm) is approximately that of the lithium ion (90 pm). Mechanisms that transport sodium across cellular membranes also transport lithium. For instance, sodium channels (both voltage-gated and epithelial) are particularly major pathways of entry for lithium. Lithium ions can also permeate through ligand-gated ion channels as well as cross both nuclear and mitochondrial membranes. Like sodium, lithium can enter and partially block (although not permeate) potassium channels and calcium channels.

The biological effects of lithium are many and varied but its mechanisms of action are only partially understood. For instance, studies of lithium-treated patients with bipolar disorder show that, among many other effects, lithium partially reverses telomere shortening in these patients and also increases mitochondrial function, although how lithium produces these pharmacological effects is not understood.

== History ==
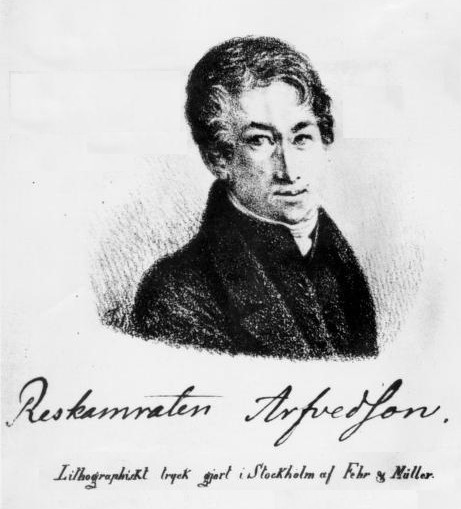
Johan August Arfwedson is credited with the discovery of lithium in 1817.

Petalite (LiAlSi_{4}O_{10}) was discovered in 1800 by the Brazilian chemist and statesman José Bonifácio de Andrada e Silva in a mine on the island of Utö, Sweden. However, it was not until 1817 that Johan August Arfwedson, then working in the laboratory of the chemist Jöns Jakob Berzelius, detected the presence of a new element while analyzing petalite ore. This element formed compounds similar to those of sodium and potassium, though its carbonate and hydroxide were less soluble in water and less alkaline. Berzelius gave the alkaline material the name "lithion/lithina", from the Greek word λιθoς (transliterated as lithos, meaning "stone"), to reflect its discovery in a solid mineral, as opposed to potassium, which had been discovered in plant ashes, and sodium, which was known partly for its high abundance in animal blood. He named the new element "lithium".

Arfwedson later showed that this same element was present in the minerals spodumene and lepidolite. In 1818, Christian Gmelin was the first to observe that lithium salts give a bright red color to flame. However, both Arfwedson and Gmelin tried and failed to isolate the pure element from its salts. It was not isolated until 1821, when William Thomas Brande obtained it by electrolysis of lithium oxide, a process that had previously been employed by the chemist Sir Humphry Davy to isolate the alkali metals potassium and sodium. Brande also described some pure salts, such as the chloride, and, estimating that lithia (lithium oxide) contained about 55% metal, estimated its atomic weight to be around 9.8 g/mol (modern value ~6.94 g/mol). In 1855, larger quantities were produced through the electrolysis of lithium chloride by Robert Bunsen and Augustus Matthiessen. The discovery of this procedure led to commercial production in 1923 by the German company Metallgesellschaft AG, which performed an electrolysis of a liquid mixture of lithium chloride and potassium chloride.

Australian psychiatrist John Cade is credited with reintroducing lithium to treat mania in 1949. Mogens Schou of Denmark continued Cade's research, starting in the 1950s. Throughout the mid-20th century, lithium's mood stabilizing applicability for mania and depression took off in Europe and the United States. As lithium cannot be patented, it was developed as a medicine by academia rather than drug companies.

Lithium grease was first used in World War II to enhance the performance of aircraft.

Production and use underwent several drastic changes in history. The first major application was in high-temperature lithium greases for machines crucial for World War II and other purposes shortly after. This use was supported by the fact that lithium-based soaps have a higher melting point than other alkali soaps, and are less corrosive than calcium based soaps. The small demand for lithium soaps and lubricating greases was supported by several small mining operations, mostly in the US.

The demand for lithium increased dramatically during the Cold War with the production of nuclear fusion weapons. Both lithium-6 and lithium-7 produce tritium when irradiated by neutrons, and are thus useful for the production of tritium by itself, as well as a form of solid fusion fuel used inside hydrogen bombs in the form of lithium deuteride. The US became the prime producer between the late 1950s and the mid-1980s. At the end, the stockpile was roughly 42,000 tonnes of lithium hydroxide. The stockpiled lithium was depleted in lithium-6 by 75%, which was enough to affect the measured atomic weight in many standardized chemicals, and even the atomic weight in some "natural sources" ion which had been "contaminated" by lithium salts discharged from isotope separation facilities, which had found its way into ground water.

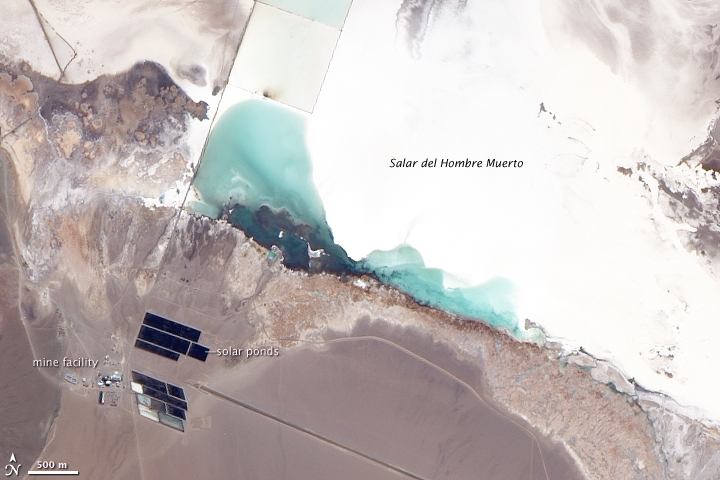
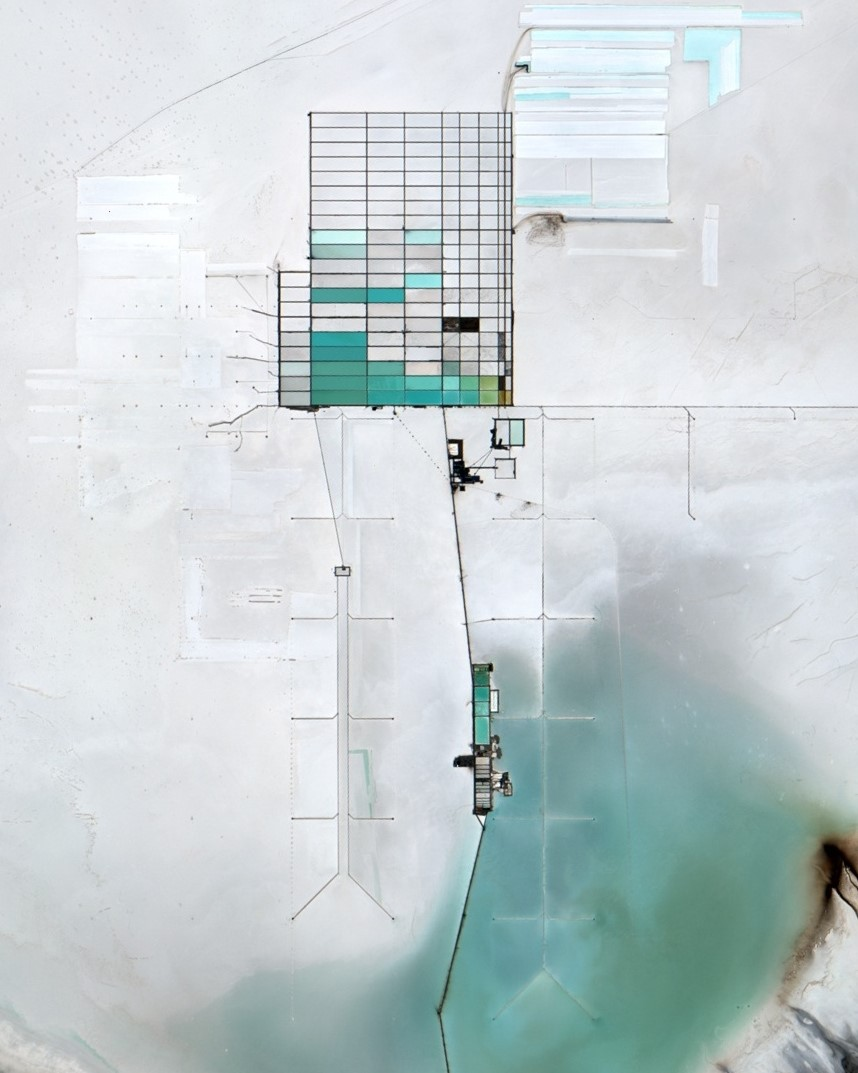
Satellite images of the Salar del Hombre Muerto, Argentina (left), and Uyuni, Bolivia (right), salt flats that are rich in lithium. The lithium-rich brine is concentrated by pumping it into solar evaporation ponds (visible in both images).

Lithium is used to decrease the melting temperature of glass and to improve the melting behavior of aluminium oxide in the Hall-Héroult process. These two uses dominated the market until the middle of the 1990s. After the end of the nuclear arms race, the demand for lithium decreased and the sale of department of energy stockpiles on the open market further reduced prices. In the mid-1990s, several companies started to isolate lithium from brine which proved to be a less expensive option than underground or open-pit mining. Most of the mines closed or shifted their focus to other materials because only the ore from zoned pegmatites could be mined for a competitive price. For example, the US mines near Kings Mountain, North Carolina, closed before the beginning of the 21st century.

The development of lithium-ion batteries increased the demand for lithium and became the dominant use in 2007. With the surge of demand for lithium batteries in the 2000s, new companies have expanded brine isolation efforts to meet the rising demand.

== Chemistry ==
=== Of lithium metal ===
Lithium reacts with water easily, but with noticeably less vigor than other alkali metals. The reaction forms hydrogen gas and lithium hydroxide. When placed over a flame, lithium compounds give off a striking crimson color, but when the metal burns strongly, the flame becomes a brilliant silver. Lithium will ignite and burn in oxygen when exposed to water or water vapor. In moist air, lithium rapidly tarnishes to form a black coating of lithium hydroxide (LiOH and LiOH·H_{2}O), lithium nitride (Li_{3}N) and lithium carbonate (Li_{2}CO_{3}, the result of a secondary reaction between LiOH and CO_{2}). Lithium is one of the few metals that react with nitrogen gas.

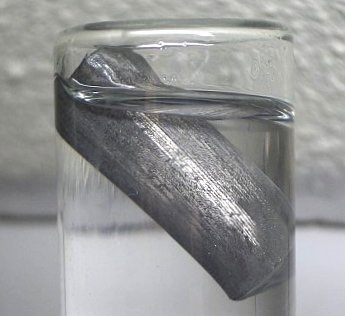
Lithium in a jar of clear petroleum jelly

Because of its reactivity with water, and especially nitrogen, lithium metal is usually stored in a hydrocarbon sealant, often petroleum jelly. Although the heavier alkali metals can be stored under mineral oil, lithium is not dense enough to fully submerge itself in these liquids.

Lithium has a diagonal relationship with magnesium, an element of similar atomic and ionic radius. Chemical resemblances between the two metals include the formation of a nitride by reaction with N_{2}, the formation of an oxide (Li_{2}O) and peroxide (Li_{2}O_{2}) when burnt in O_{2}, salts with similar solubilities, and thermal instability of the carbonates and nitrides. The metal reacts with hydrogen gas at high temperatures to produce lithium hydride (LiH).

Lithium forms a variety of binary and ternary materials by direct reaction with the main group elements. These Zintl phases, although highly covalent, can be viewed as salts of polyatomic anions such as Si_{4}^{4-}, P_{7}^{3-}, and Te_{5}^{2-}. With graphite, lithium forms a variety of intercalation compounds.

It dissolves in ammonia (and amines) to give [Li(NH_{3})_{4}]^{+} and the solvated electron.

=== Inorganic compounds ===
Lithium forms salt-like derivatives with all halides and pseudohalides. Some examples include the halides LiF, LiCl, LiBr, LiI, as well as the pseudohalides and related anions. Lithium carbonate has been described as the most important compound of lithium. This white solid is the principal product of beneficiation of lithium ores. It is a precursor to other salts including ceramics and materials for lithium batteries.

The compounds LiBH_{4} and LiAlH_{4} are useful reagents. These salts and many other lithium salts exhibit distinctively high solubility in ethers, in contrast with salts of heavier alkali metals.

In aqueous solution, the coordination complex [Li(H_{2}O)_{4}]^{+} predominates for many lithium salts. Related complexes are known with amines and ethers.

=== Organic chemistry ===
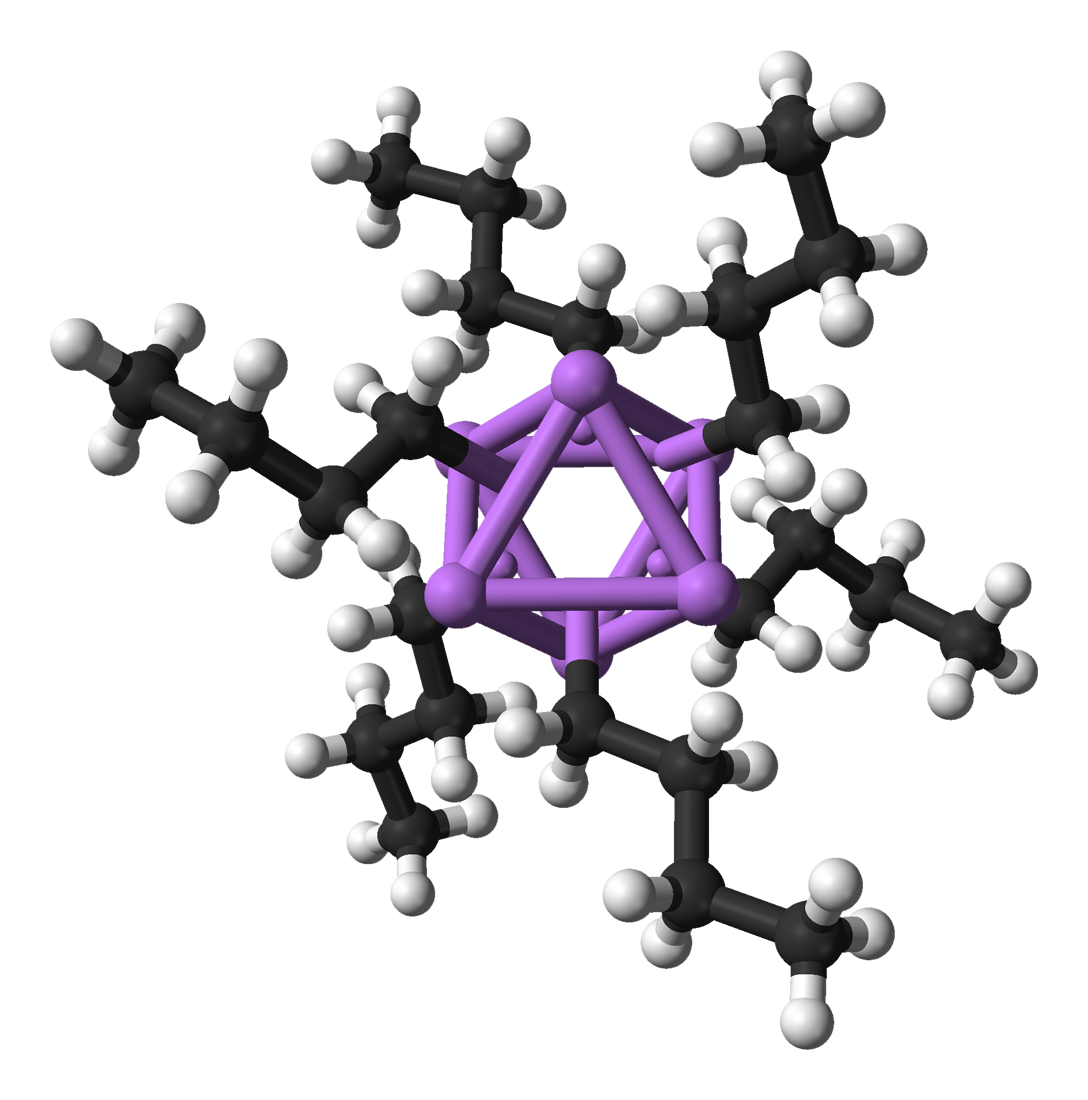
Hexameric structure of the n-butyllithium fragment in a crystal

Organolithium compounds are numerous and useful. They are defined by the presence of a bond between carbon and lithium. They serve as metal-stabilized carbanions, although their solution and solid-state structures are more complex than this simplistic view. Thus, these are extremely powerful bases and nucleophiles. They have also been applied in asymmetric synthesis in the pharmaceutical industry. For laboratory organic synthesis, many organolithium reagents are commercially available in solution form. These reagents are highly reactive, and are sometimes pyrophoric.

Like its inorganic compounds, almost all organic compounds of lithium formally follow the duet rule (e.g., BuLi, MeLi). However, in the absence of coordinating solvents or ligands, organolithium compounds form dimeric, tetrameric, and hexameric clusters (e.g., BuLi is actually [BuLi]_{6} and MeLi is actually [MeLi]_{4}) which feature multi-center bonding and increase the coordination number around lithium. These clusters are broken down into smaller or monomeric units in the presence of solvents like dimethoxyethane (DME) or ligands like tetramethylethylenediamine (TMEDA). As an exception to the duet rule, a two-coordinate lithate complex with four electrons around lithium, [Li(thf)_{4}]^{+}[((Me_{3}Si)_{3}C)_{2}Li]^{–}, has been characterized crystallographically.

== Production ==
Lithium production

Lithium production, reserves and resources in tonnes (USGS 2026)
Country	Production	Reserves	Resources
Argentina	23,000	4,400,000	28,000,000
Australia	92,000	6,400,000	10,000,000
Bolivia	—	—	23,000,000
Brazil	12,000	540,000	1,400,000
Canada	5,600	1,600,000	8,100,000
Chile	56,000	9,200,000	13,000,000
China	62,000	4,600,000	10,000,000
Czech Republic	—	—	1,300,000
DR Congo	—	—	3,000,000
Germany	—	—	8,900,000 (Note: A deposit of 43 million tons was discovered in Sachsen-Anhalt in 2025.)
India	—	—	5,900,000
Mali	9,400	—	1,200,000
Mexico	—	—	1,700,000
Peru	—	—	1,000,000
Portugal	380	60,000	260,000
Russia	—	—	1,000,000
Serbia	—	—	1,200,000
United States	870 (Note: In 2013)	4,400,000	30,000,000
Zimbabwe	28,000	500,000	860,000
Other countries	290,000	2,400,000	36,000,000
World total	204,000 (Note: Excludes U.S. production)	30,000,000	150,000,000+

Lithium is extracted from brines and ores.

Lithium metal is produced through electrolysis applied to a mixture of fused 55% lithium chloride and 45% potassium chloride at about 450 °C.

=== Reserves ===
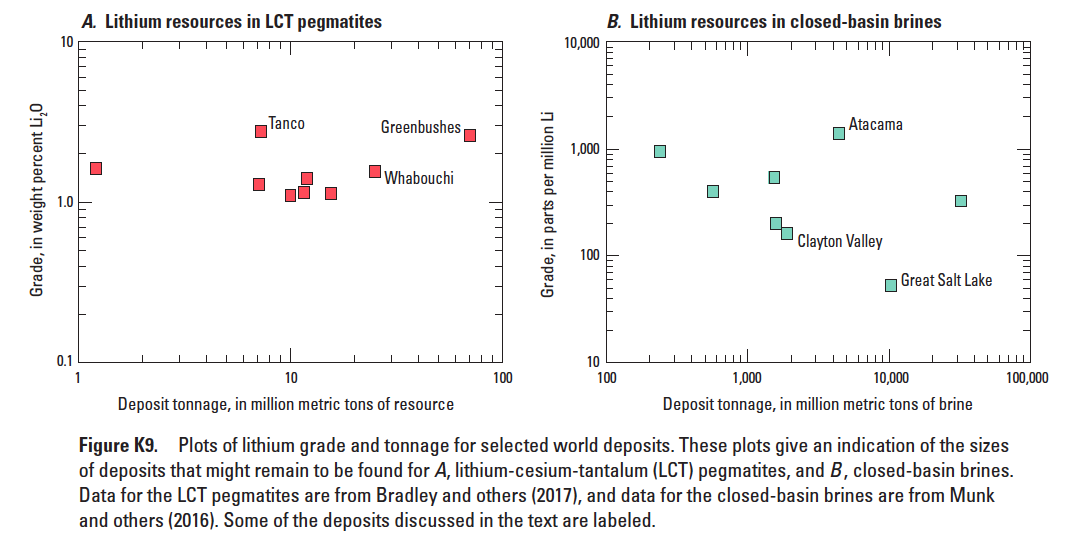
Scatter plots of grade and tonnage for selected world deposits, as of 2017

The number of known lithium-containing deposits and brines is large, although most are either small or have too low Li^{+} concentrations for practical extraction. Thus, only a few are of commercial value.

The US Geological Survey (USGS) estimated worldwide identified lithium reserves in 2023 to be 28 Mt. An accurate estimate of world lithium reserves is difficult because most lithium classification schemes estimate solid ore deposits, while brine reserves are not comparable due to varying concentrations and pumping effects and the amount in seawater dwarfs terrestrial sources.

In 2025, world production from spodumene was around 290,000 t per annum outside the US, led by Australia at 92,000 t. The Talison mine in Greenbushes is reported to be the largest and to have the highest grade of ore at 2.4% Li_{2}O.

==== Brine sources ====
The world's top four lithium-producing countries in 2019, as reported by the US Geological Survey, were Australia, China, Chile, and Zimbabwe.

Chile, Bolivia, and Argentina contain a region known as the Lithium Triangle, known for its high-quality salt flats, which include Bolivia's Salar de Uyuni, Chile's Salar de Atacama, and Argentina's Salar de Arizaro.

Bolivia's Uyuni Desert holds 5.4 million t. Half the world's known reserves as of 2022 were located in Bolivia along the Andes' central eastern slope but production is negligible. The brines in the Triangle's salt pans vary widely in lithium content. Concentrations vary over time as brines are fluids that are changeable and mobile.

Brine in Wyoming's Rock Springs Uplift contain an estimated 18 Mt. In Nevada, the McDermitt Caldera hosts lithium-bearing volcanic muds that are the largest known deposits within the United States.

In the US, lithium is recovered from brine pools in Nevada. Projects are under development in Lithium Valley in California and in southwest Arkansas using direct lithium extraction, drawing on Smackover Formation brine.

The South West Arkansas Project (SWA) is being developed by Standard Lithium and Equinor to extract commercial quantities of battery-grade lithium (22,500 tonnes of lithium carbonate annually) from the large lithium brine resource in the Arkansas portion of the Smackover Formation. SWA received US Federal government designation as a "Priority Critical Mineral Project" in April 2025 and all Federal permitting for an operational facility was completed in May 2026. SWA design capacity (22,500 tonnes annually) would be a 4x increase in US domestic battery-grade lithium production, which in 2025, the U.S. produced only 1% of global lithium.

A 43 million ton deposit of Rotliegend lithium carbonate equivalent was discovered in the Altmark region of Saxony-Anhalt, Germany, in 2025.

==== Hard-rock deposits ====
In 2018 the Democratic Republic of Congo (DRC) was estimated to have the world's largest lithium spodumene resource. The Manono deposit may hold up to 1.5 billion tons of spodumene. The two largest pegmatite deposits (the Carriere de l'Este Pegmatite and the Roche Dure Pegmatite) are each of similar size or larger than the Greenbushes Pegmatite in Western Australia. Thus, the DRC could become a significant supplier.

On 16 July 2018 2.5 Mt of high-grade lithium resources and 124 million pounds of uranium resources were found in the Falchani deposit in Puno, Peru. In 2020, Australia granted Major Project Status (MPS) to the Finniss Lithium Project: an estimated 3.45 Mt (Mt) of mineral resource at 1.4 percent lithium oxide. Operational mining began in 2022.

The Pampean Pegmatite Province in Argentina holds at least 200,000 tons of spodumene with lithium oxide (Li_{2}O) grades varying between 5 and 8 wt %.

Russia's largest lithium deposit Kolmozerskoye is located in Murmansk region. In 2023, Polar Lithium, a Nornickel and Rosatom joint venture held the right to develop the deposit. The project aims to produce 60,000 tonnes of lithium carbonate and hydroxide per year by 2030.

==== Other sources ====
Another potential source is geothermal well leachates, which are carried to the surface. The lithium is separated by filtration. Reserves are more limited than those of brine reservoirs and hard rock.

=== Pricing ===
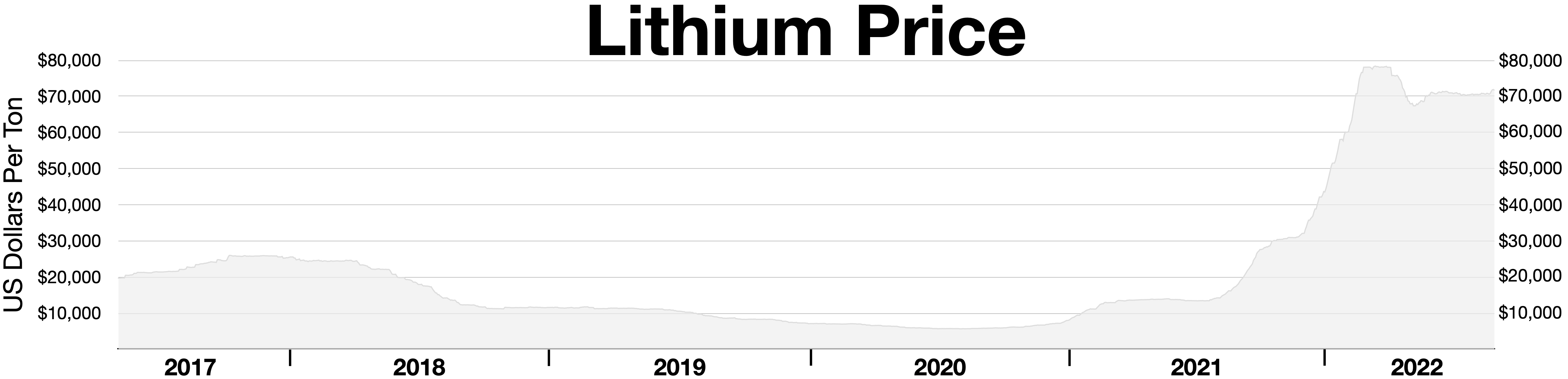
Lithium prices

=== Extraction ===
Analyses of extraction from seawater, published in 1975

Lithium and its compounds were historically isolated and extracted from hard rock. However, by the 1990s mineral springs, brine pools, and brine deposits had become the dominant source.

==== Solar evaporation ====
The lithium can be extracted from the brine by evaporative processes. In Chile's Salar de Atacama, the lithium concentration in the brine is raised by solar evaporation in a system of ponds. The enrichment by evaporation process may require up to one-and-a-half years, when the brine reaches a lithium content of 6%. The final processing in this example is done in Salar del Carmen and La Negra near the coastal city of Antofagasta where pure lithium carbonate, lithium hydroxide, and lithium chloride are produced from the brine. Evaporitic technology is a long duration process requiring large amounts of land and intensive water use, and can only be applied to the large continental brines.

==== Direct lithium extraction ====
Direct Lithium Extraction (DLE) technologies may become alternatives to evaporation. The DLE techniques offer high lithium recovery rates and high purity with potentially lower environmental impact especially in the use of less water. However these technologies have not been tested at industrial scale and their relative cost is unknown. The techniques may require unusual materials that may have limited availability or their own environmental impacts. US firms are attempting to bring DLE into commercial production.

One DLE method is to process brine through an electrolytic cell, located within a membrane.

Electrodialysis and electrochemical intercalation was proposed in 2020 to extract lithium from seawater (which contains lithium at 0.2 parts per million).

Ion-selective cells within a membrane could collect lithium either via an electric field or osmotic pressure.

In 2024, a redox/electrodialysis system was claimed to offer cost savings, shorter timelines, and less environmental damage than evaporative systems.

A 2026 study reported a 95% recovery rate via a hybrid process that began by evaporating brine, forming a solid salt mixture.Acetone and ethanol were used to selectively dissolve lithium salts, leaving most other compounds behind.The method substantially reduces freshwater use compared to traditional methods, the researchers say. And the method could be coupled with solar-powered systems that capture and condense the evaporated water, allowing it to be recycled instead of being lost to the atmosphere. The solvents could also be recovered and reused.

Another approach exploits the fact that under specific conditions lithium ions are thermophilic. A temperature gradient separates lithium from other ions.

==== From clay and from spodumene ore ====
Large lithium-clay deposits under development in the McDermitt caldera (Nevada, United States) require concentrated sulfuric acid to leach lithium from the clay ore.

Spodumene has a relatively high lithium content, making it the main mineral ore for the element. However, the ore is typically heated before extraction to convert the crystal structure and liberate the lithium. Then the ore is treated with sulfuric acid at 250 C to form Li_{2}SO_{4} and LiHSO_{4}. Leaching with water and Na_{2}CO_{4} yields Li_{2}CO_{4}.

Another approach is to crush the ore in a ball mill to disrupt its crystalline structure. The result is flooded with water containing a salt such as NaCl or MgCl_{2}. The sodium and magnesium ions displace the lithium, which washes away with the water at concentrations on the order of 200 ppm. The process does not require heat or the use of sulfuric or other strong acids and does not produce toxic byproducts. The process is in production near Corpus Christi, Texas.

=== Environmental issues ===
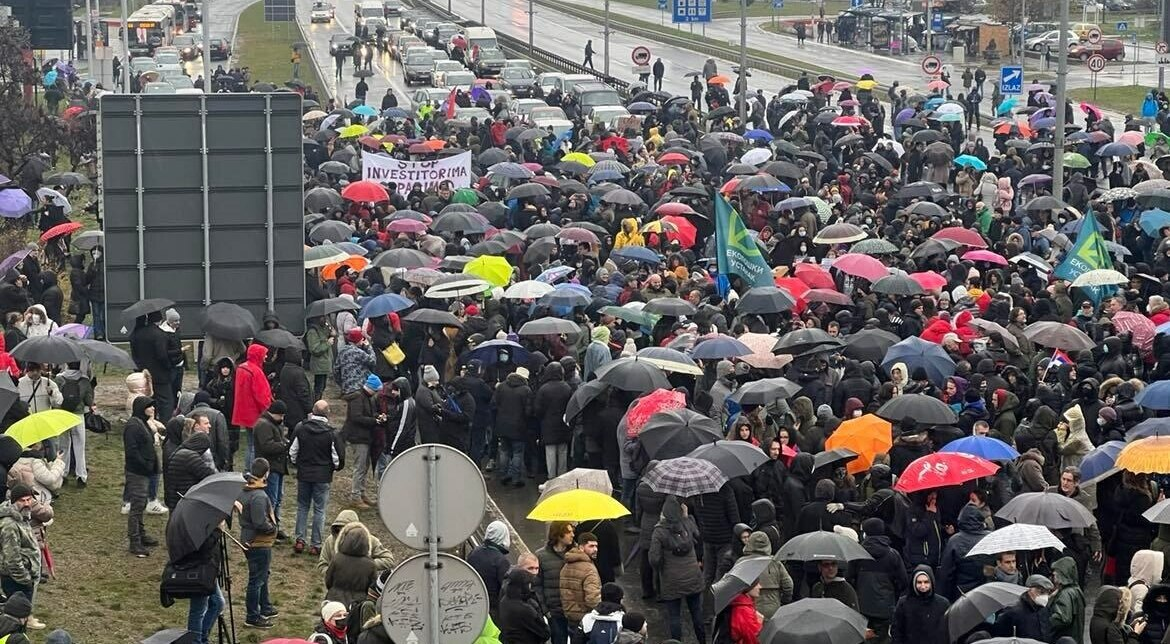
Environmental protests in Belgrade, Serbia, 11 December 2021

Particular manufacturing processes can present environmental and health hazards. Lithium extraction done poorly can be fatal to aquatic life due to water pollution. The surface brine evaporation process has been known to cause surface water contamination, drinking water contamination, respiratory problems, ecosystem degradation and landscape damage, and could lead to unsustainable water consumption in arid regions (1.9 million liters per ton), such as in northwestern Argentina. Massive byproduct generation of evaporative surface lithium extraction also presents unsolved problems, such as large amounts of magnesium and lime waste.

Although lithium occurs naturally, it is a non-renewable resource yet is seen as crucial in the transition away from fossil fuels, and the extraction process has been criticised for long-term degradation of water resources. In the southern reaches of Salar de Atacama lithium-producing company Albemarle Limitada reached a concialiatory agreement in 2024 to make reparations freshwater uptake that would have contributed –along with the uptake of copper mining companies– to dry meadows located in the traditional lands of the indigenous Atacameño people. In its defense Albemarle Limitada have asserted that its use is minimal compared to that of the nearby copper mining companies.

In the United States, open-pit mining and mountaintop removal mining compete with brine extraction mining. Environmental concerns include wildlife habitat degradation, potable water pollution including arsenic and antimony contamination, unsustainable water table reduction, and massive mining waste, including radioactive uranium byproduct and sulfuric acid discharge.

During 2021, a series of mass protests broke out in Serbia against the construction of a lithium mine in Western Serbia by the Rio Tinto corporation. In 2024, an EU backed lithium mining project created large scale protests in Serbia.

Some animal species associated with salt lakes in the Lithium Triangle (in Argentina, Bolivia, and Chile) are particularly threatened by the damages of production to the local ecosystem, including the Andean flamingo and Orestias parinacotensis, a small fish locally known as "karachi".

=== Human rights issues ===
Reporting on lithium extraction companies and indigenous peoples in Argentina found that the state may did not always protect indigenous peoples' right to free prior and informed consent, and that extraction companies generally controlled community access to information and set the terms for discussion of the projects and benefit sharing.

In Argentina's Puna region, in 2023, two mining companies (Minera Exar and Sales de Jujuy) extracted over 3.7 billion liters of fresh water, over 31 times the annual water consumption of the local community of Susques department.

Extraction of brines in Salar de Atacama in Chile led to conflict about water use with local communities. The local indigenous population of Likan Antay have a history of both opposing lithium extraction and negotiating for shared benefits with lithium companies. Negotiations occur under the framework of the Indigenous and Tribal Peoples Convention which Chile signed in 2008. It is argued that in Chile "[a]greements between Indigenous organizations and lithium companies have brought significant economic resources for community development, but have also expanded the mining industry's capacity for social control in the area.".

In Zimbabwe, the global increase in lithium prices in the early 2020s triggered a 'lithium fever' that led to displacement of locals and conflicts between small-scale artisanal miners and large-scale mining companies. Some local farmers agreed to relocate and were satisfied with their compensation. Artisanal miners occupied parts of the Sandawana mines and a privately owned lithium claim area in Goromonzi, a rural area close to the capital Harare. The artisanal miners were later evicted after the area was cordoned off and shut down by Zimbabwe's Environmental Management Agency.

Development of the Thacker Pass lithium mine in Nevada, United States, has met with protests and lawsuits from several indigenous tribes who have said they were not provided free prior and informed consent and that the project threatens cultural and sacred sites. They have also expressed concerns that development of the project will create risks to indigenous women, because resource extraction is linked to missing and murdered Indigenous women. Protestors have been occupying the site of the proposed mine since January 2021.

== Applications ==
=== Batteries ===
How lithium is used globally, 2026
1. Batteries (88.0%)
2. Ceramics and glass (4.00%)
3. Lubricating greases (2.00%)
4. Air treatment (1.00%)
5. Mold flux (1.00%)
6. Medical uses (1.00%)
7. Other uses (3.00%)

In 2026, 88% of the world's lithium production was used to make lithium-ion batteries.

Lithium-ion batteries have become essential in modern technology powering things such as electric cars, portable electronics, and satellites. In the 20th century, lithium became an important component of battery electrolytes and electrodes because of its high electrode potential. Other rechargeable batteries that use lithium include the lithium polymer battery and the lithium iron phosphate battery.

=== Ceramics and glass ===
The second largest use, accounting for 4% of lithium worldwide, is in the production of ceramics and glass. Lithium oxide is widely used as a flux for processing silica, reducing the melting point and viscosity of the material and leading to glazes with improved physical properties including low coefficients of thermal expansion. Glazes containing lithium oxides are used for ovenware. Lithium carbonate (Li_{2}CO_{3}) is generally used in this application because it makes the glaze less fragile and be able to withstand rapidly changing temperatures.

=== Lubricating greases ===
The third most common use is in greases, accounting for 2% of lithium worldwide. Lithium hydroxide is a strong base, and when heated with a fat, it produces a soap, such as lithium stearate from stearic acid. Lithium soap has the ability to thicken oils, and it is used to manufacture all-purpose, high-temperature lubricating greases.

=== Metallurgy ===
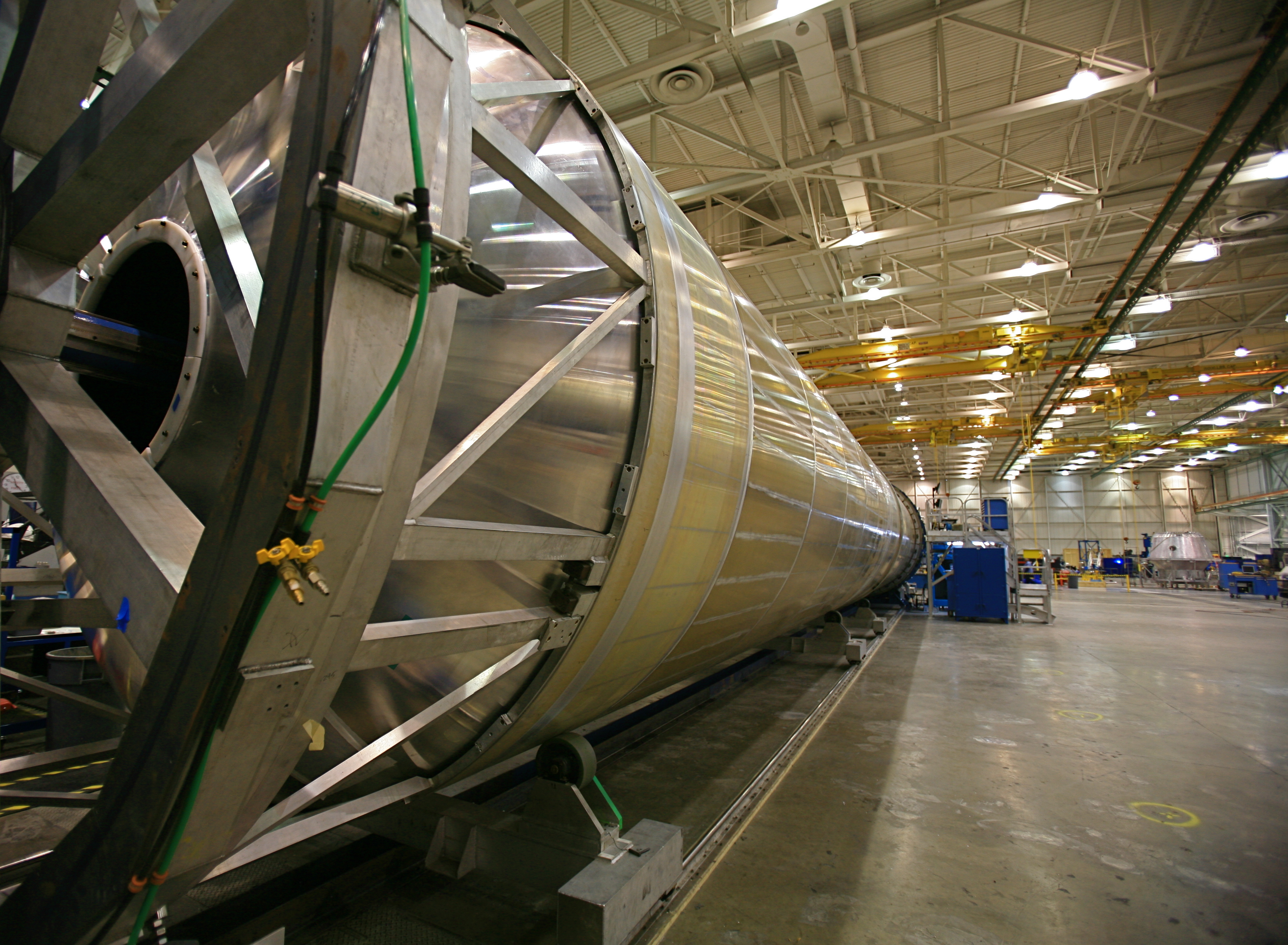
The SpaceX Falcon 9 booster is made of aluminum-lithium alloy.

Lithium (e.g. as lithium carbonate) is used as an additive to continuous casting mould flux slags where it increases fluidity, a use which accounts for 1% of global lithium use (2026). Lithium compounds are also used as additives (fluxes) to foundry sand for iron casting to reduce veining.

Lithium (as lithium fluoride) is used as an additive to aluminium smelters (Hall–Héroult process), reducing melting temperature and increasing electrical resistance, a use which accounts for 0.3–1.5% of production (2026).

When used as a flux for welding or soldering, metallic lithium promotes the fusing of metals during the process and eliminates the formation of oxides by absorbing impurities. Alloys of the metal with aluminium, cadmium, copper and manganese are used to make high-performance, low density aircraft parts (see also Lithium-aluminium alloys).

=== Silicon nano-welding ===
Lithium has been found effective in assisting the perfection of silicon nano-welds in electronic components for electric batteries and other devices.

=== Pyrotechnics ===
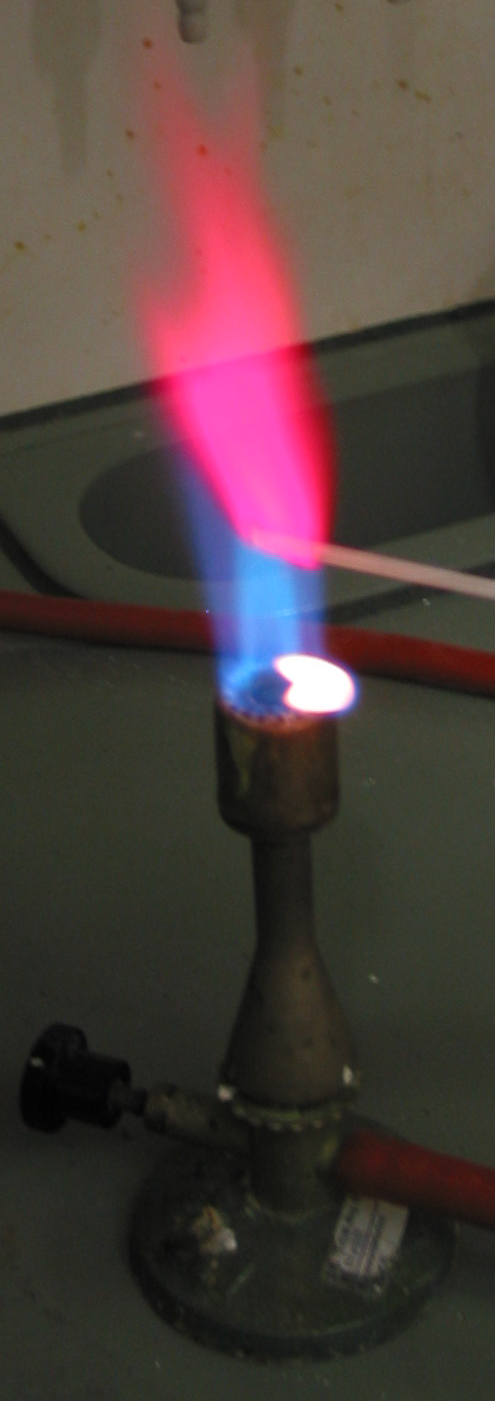
Lithium is used in flares and pyrotechnics is due to its rose-red flame.

Lithium compounds are used as pyrotechnic colorants and oxidizers in red fireworks and flares.

=== Air purification ===
Lithium chloride and lithium bromide are hygroscopic and are used as desiccants for gas streams. Lithium hydroxide and lithium peroxide are the salts most commonly used in confined areas, such as aboard spacecraft and submarines, for carbon dioxide removal and air purification. Lithium hydroxide absorbs carbon dioxide from the air by forming lithium carbonate, and is preferred over other alkaline hydroxides for its low weight.

Lithium peroxide (Li_{2}O_{2}) in presence of moisture not only reacts with carbon dioxide to form lithium carbonate, but also releases oxygen. The reaction is as follows:

2 Li_{2}O_{2} + 2 CO_{2} → 2 Li_{2}CO_{3} + O_{2}

Some of the aforementioned compounds, as well as lithium perchlorate, are used in oxygen candles that supply submarines with oxygen. These can also include small amounts of boron, magnesium, aluminium, silicon, titanium, manganese, and iron.

=== Optics ===
Lithium fluoride, artificially grown as crystal, is clear and transparent and often used in specialist optics for IR, UV and VUV (vacuum UV) applications. It has one of the lowest refractive indices and the furthest transmission range in the deep UV of most common materials. Finely divided lithium fluoride powder has been used for thermoluminescent radiation dosimetry (TLD): when a sample of such is exposed to radiation, it accumulates crystal defects which, when heated, resolve via a release of bluish light whose intensity is proportional to the absorbed dose, thus allowing this to be quantified. Lithium fluoride is sometimes used in focal lenses of telescopes.

The high non-linearity of lithium niobate also makes it useful in non-linear optics applications. It is used extensively in telecommunication products such as mobile phones and optical modulators, for such components as resonant crystals. Lithium applications are used in more than 60% of mobile phones.

=== Organic and polymer chemistry ===
Organolithium compounds are widely used in the production of polymer and fine-chemicals. In the polymer industry, which is the dominant consumer of these reagents, alkyl lithium compounds are catalysts/initiators in anionic polymerization of unfunctionalized olefins. For the production of fine chemicals, organolithium compounds function as strong bases and as reagents for the formation of carbon-carbon bonds. Organolithium compounds are prepared from lithium metal and alkyl halides.

Many other lithium compounds are used as reagents to prepare organic compounds. Some popular compounds include lithium aluminium hydride (LiAlH_{4}), lithium triethylborohydride, n-butyllithium and tert-butyllithium.

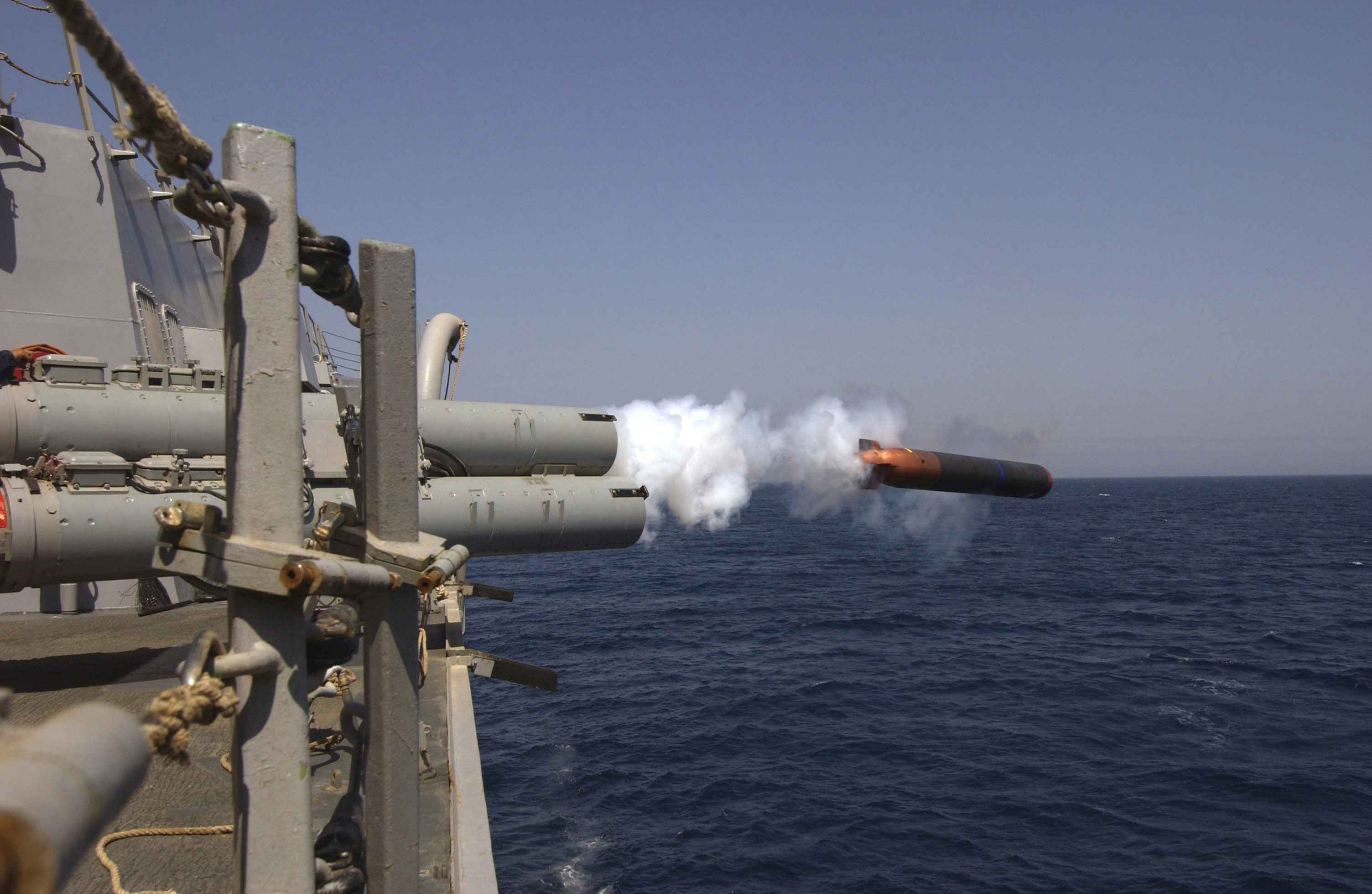
The launch of a torpedo using lithium as fuel

=== Military ===
Metallic lithium and its complex hydrides, such as lithium aluminium hydride (LiAlH_{4}), are used as high-energy additives to rocket propellants. LiAlH_{4} can also be used by itself as a solid fuel.

The Mark 50 torpedo stored chemical energy propulsion system (SCEPS) uses a small tank of sulfur hexafluoride, which is sprayed over a block of solid lithium. The reaction generates heat, creating steam to propel the torpedo in a closed Rankine cycle.

Lithium hydride containing lithium-6 is used in thermonuclear weapons, where it serves as fuel for the fusion stage of the bomb.

=== Nuclear ===
Lithium-6 is valued as a source material for tritium production and as a neutron absorber in nuclear fusion. Natural lithium contains about 7.5% lithium-6 from which large amounts of lithium-6 have been produced by isotope separation for use in nuclear weapons. Lithium-7 gained interest for use in nuclear reactor coolants.

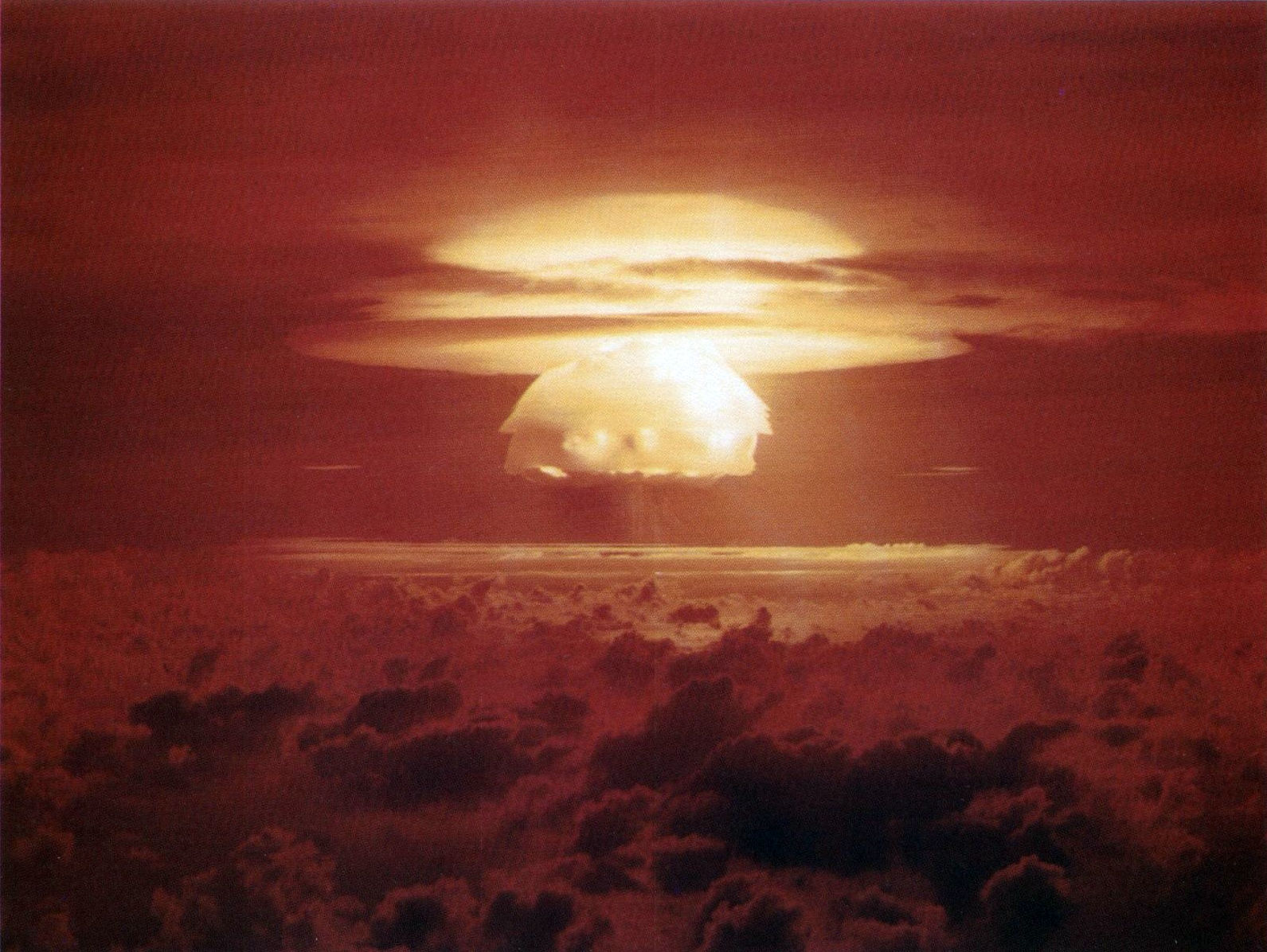
Lithium deuteride was used as fuel in the Castle Bravo nuclear device.

Lithium deuteride was the fusion fuel of choice in early versions of the hydrogen bomb. When bombarded by neutrons, both ^{6}Li and ^{7}Li produce tritium—this reaction, which was not fully understood when hydrogen bombs were first tested, was responsible for the runaway yield of the Castle Bravo nuclear test. Tritium fuses with deuterium in a fusion reaction that is relatively easy to achieve. Although details remain secret, lithium-6 deuteride apparently still plays a role in modern nuclear weapons as a fusion material.

Lithium fluoride, when highly enriched in the lithium-7 isotope, forms the basic constituent of the fluoride salt mixture LiF-BeF_{2} used in liquid fluoride nuclear reactors. Lithium fluoride is exceptionally chemically stable and LiF-BeF_{2} mixtures have low melting points. In addition, ^{7}Li, Be, and F are among the few nuclides with low enough thermal neutron capture cross-sections not to poison the fission reactions inside a nuclear fission reactor. (Note: Beryllium and fluorine occur only as one isotope, ^{9}Be and ^{19}F respectively. These two, together with ^{7}Li, as well as ^{2}H, ^{11}B, ^{15}N, ^{209}Bi, and the stable isotopes of C, and O, are the only nuclides with low enough thermal neutron capture cross sections aside from actinides to serve as major constituents of a molten salt breeder reactor fuel.)

In conceptualized (hypothetical) nuclear fusion power plants, lithium will be used to produce tritium in magnetically confined reactors using deuterium and tritium as the fuel. Naturally occurring tritium is extremely rare and must be synthetically produced by surrounding the reacting plasma with a 'blanket' containing lithium, where neutrons from the deuterium-tritium reaction in the plasma will fission the lithium to produce more tritium:

^{6}Li + n → ^{4}He + ^{3}H.

Lithium is also used as a source for alpha particles, or helium nuclei. When ^{7}Li is bombarded by accelerated protons ^{8}Be is formed, which almost immediately undergoes fission to form two alpha particles. This feat, called "splitting the atom" at the time, was the first fully human-made nuclear reaction. It was produced by Cockroft and Walton in 1932. Injection of powders is used in fusion reactors to manipulate plasma-material interactions and dissipate energy in the hot thermo-nuclear fusion plasma boundary.

In 2013, the US Government Accountability Office said a shortage of lithium-7 critical to the operation of 65 out of 100 American nuclear reactors "places their ability to continue to provide electricity at some risk." The problem stems from the decline of US nuclear infrastructure. The equipment needed to separate lithium-6 from lithium-7 is mostly a cold war leftover. The US shut down most of this machinery in 1963, when it had a huge surplus of separated lithium, mostly consumed during the twentieth century. The report said it would take five years and $10 million to $12 million to reestablish the ability to separate lithium-6 from lithium-7.

Reactors that use lithium-7 heat water under high pressure and transfer heat through heat exchangers that are prone to corrosion. The reactors use lithium to counteract the corrosive effects of boric acid, which is added to the water to absorb excess neutrons.

=== Medicine ===
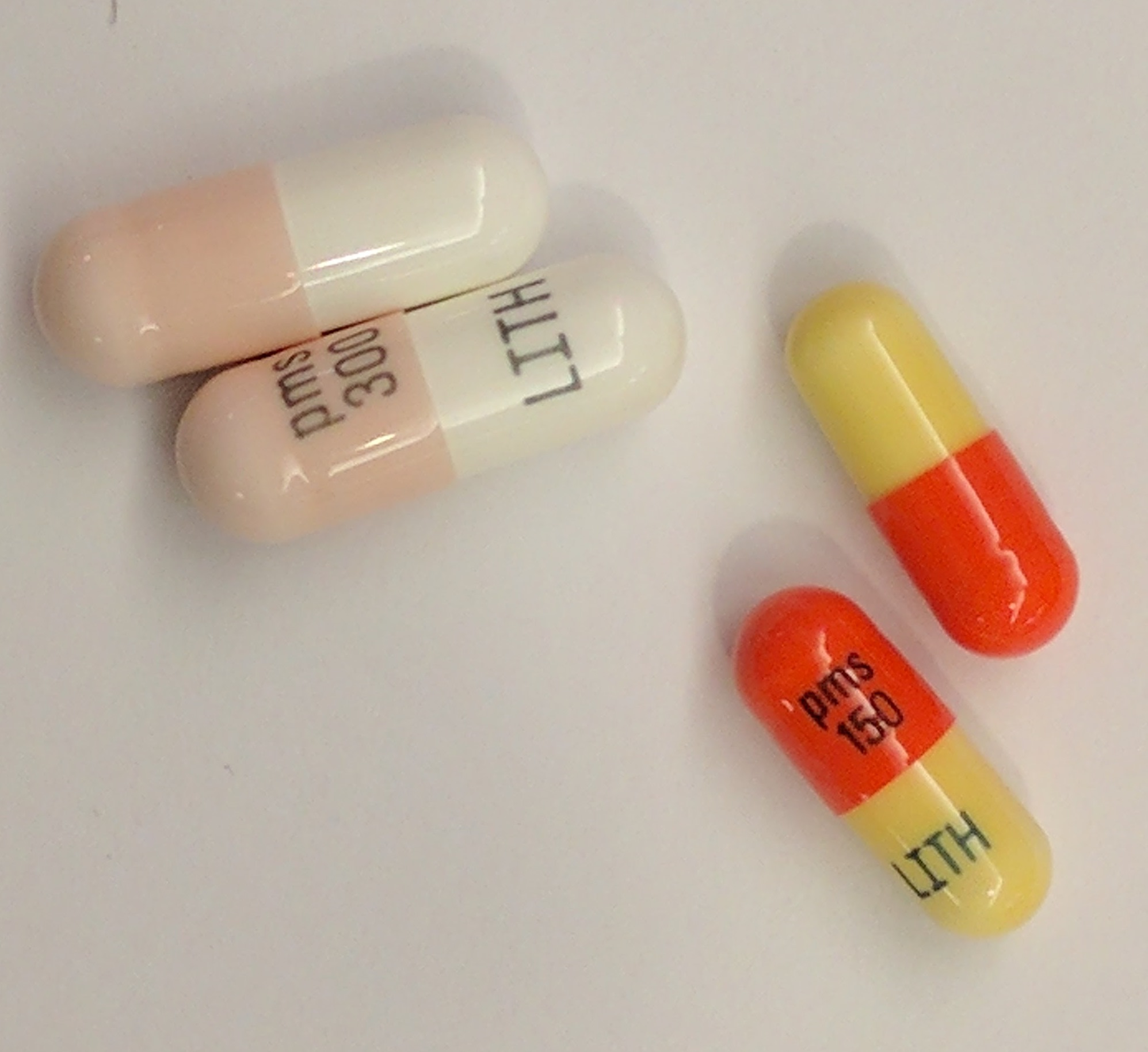
Lithium carbonate capsules

Lithium is useful in the treatment of bipolar disorder. Lithium can be used to treat both depression and mania, and as a maintenance treatment in bipolar disorder. Lithium salts may also be helpful for related diagnoses, such as schizoaffective disorder and cyclic major depressive disorder. The active part of these salts is the lithium ion Li^{+}.

Lithium may increase the risk of developing Ebstein's cardiac anomaly in infants born to women who take lithium during the first trimester of pregnancy. Too much lithium can lead to lithium toxicity. Lithium carbonate is classified as a mood stabilizer and is on the World Health Organization's List of Essential Medicines.

Several randomized controlled trials and other studies over 40 years has shown that lithium is highly effective in reducing suicide among people with mood disorders. In addition to its effects on suicide, lithium also reduces mortality from all causes in people with mood disorders.

Lithium use has been correlated with reduced suicides even at very low doses. Trace amounts in the water supply have been associated with a decreased risk of suicide, homicide, rape, drug arrests, and other crimes.

== Precautions ==
Lithium
Hazards
- GHS labelling
Pictograms	(GHS02: Flammable) (GHS05: Corrosive)
Signal word	Danger
Hazard statements	H260, H314
Precautionary statements	P223, P231+P232, P280, P305+P351+P338, P370+P378, P422
NFPA 704 (fire diamond)	3 2 2 W

Lithium metal is corrosive and requires special handling to avoid skin contact. Breathing lithium dust or lithium compounds (which are often alkaline) initially irritate the nose and throat, while higher exposure can cause a buildup of fluid in the lungs, leading to pulmonary edema. The metal itself is a handling hazard because contact with moisture produces the caustic lithium hydroxide. Lithium metal is safely stored in non-reactive compounds such as naphtha and petroleum jelly.

== See also ==
- Cosmological lithium problem
- Dilithium
- Halo nucleus
- Isotopes of lithium
- List of countries by lithium production
- Lithia water
- Lithium–air battery
- Lithium burning
- Category:Lithium compounds
- Lithium-ion battery
- Lithium Tokamak Experiment
