= Hydrogen telluride =

Inorganic compound

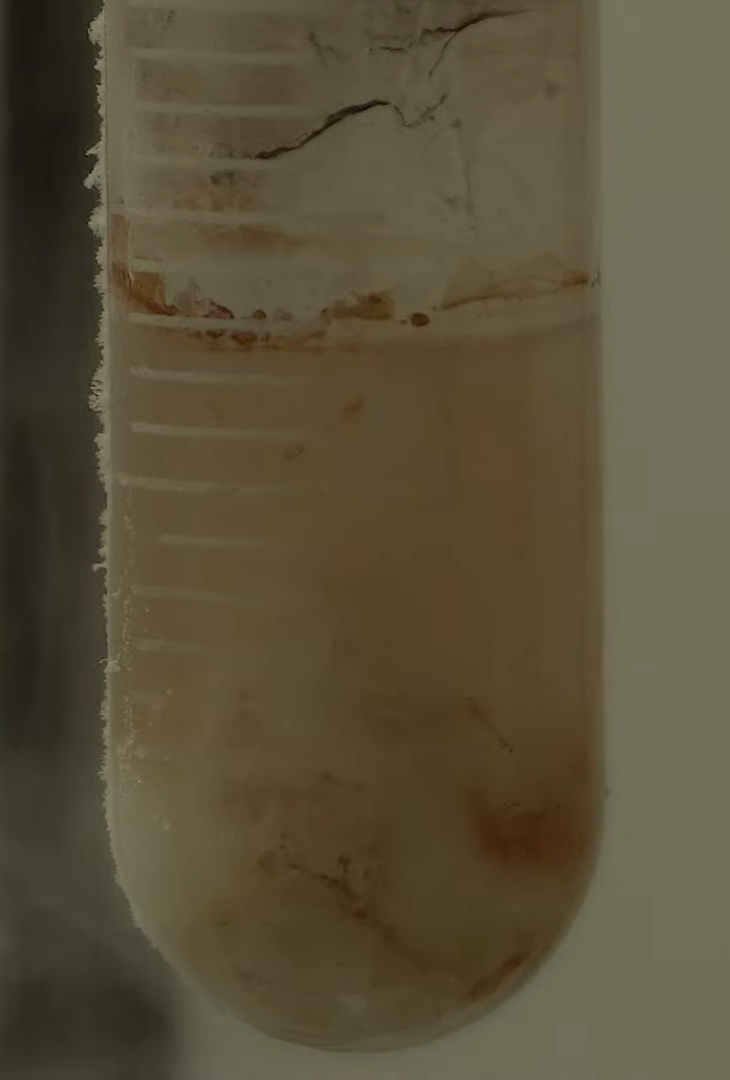
- Liquid hydrogen telluride in a test tube

- Structural diagram of the hydrogen telluride molecule

- Space-filling model of the hydrogen telluride molecule Tellurium, Te Hydrogen, H

Names
- IUPAC name hydrogen telluride
- Other names hydrotelluric acid tellane tellurium hydride dihydrogen telluride

Identifiers
CAS Number	7783-09-7
3D model (JSmol)	Interactive image
ChEBI	CHEBI:30452
ChemSpider	20455
ECHA InfoCard	100.029.073
EC Number	236-813-4
PubChem CID	21765
UNII	7F4735942K
CompTox Dashboard (EPA)	DTXSID20228446
- InChI: InChI=1S/H2Te/h1H2 Key: VTLHPSMQDDEFRU-UHFFFAOYSA-N
- SMILES: [TeH2]

Properties
Chemical formula	H_{2}Te
Molar mass	129.62 g·mol^{−1}
Appearance	colourless gas
Odor	Pungent (strongly putrid), resembles rotting garlic or leeks
Density	3.310 g/L, gas 2.57 g/cm^{3} (−20 °C, liquid)
Melting point	−49 °C (−56 °F; 224 K)
Boiling point	−2.2 °C (28.0 °F; 270.9 K) (unstable above −2 °C)
Solubility in water	0.70 g/100 mL
Acidity (pK_{a})	2.6
Conjugate acid	Telluronium
Conjugate base	Telluride

Structure
Molecular shape	bent

Thermochemistry
Std enthalpy of formation (Δ_{f}H^{⦵}_{298})	0.7684 kJ/g

Hazards
- Occupational safety and health (OHS/OSH)
Main hazards	Highly toxic and flammable
NFPA 704 (fire diamond)	4 4 1

Related compounds
Other anions	H_{2}O; H_{2}S; H_{2}Se; H_{2}Po
Other cations	Li_{2}Te; Na_{2}Te; Ag_{2}Te; K_{2}Te; Rb_{2}Te; Cs_{2}Te
Related compounds	Telluric acid Tellurous acid Stibine
- Except where otherwise noted, data are given for materials in their standard state (at 25 °C [77 °F], 100 kPa). verify (what is ?) Infobox references

Hydrogen telluride is the inorganic compound with the formula H_{2}Te. A hydrogen chalcogenide and the simplest hydride of tellurium, it is a colorless gas. Although unstable in ambient air, the gas can exist long enough to be readily detected by its rotting garlic-like odour at extremely low concentrations, or by the revolting odour of rotting leeks that it has at somewhat higher concentrations. Most compounds with Te–H bonds (tellurols) are unstable with respect to loss of H_{2}. H_{2}Te is chemically and structurally similar to hydrogen selenide, and both are acidic. The H–Te–H angle is about 90°. Volatile tellurium compounds often have unpleasant odours, reminiscent of decayed leeks or garlic.

== Synthesis ==
Electrolytic methods have been developed. H_{2}Te can also be prepared by hydrolysis of the telluride derivatives of electropositive metals. The typical hydrolysis is that of aluminium telluride:

Al_{2}Te_{3} + 6 H_{2}O → 2 Al(OH)_{3} + 3 H_{2}Te

Other salts of Te^{2−} such as MgTe and sodium telluride can also be used. Na_{2}Te can be made by the reaction of Na and Te in anhydrous ammonia. The intermediate in the hydrolysis, HTe^{−}, can be isolated as salts as well. NaHTe can be made by reducing tellurium with NaBH_{4}.

Hydrogen telluride cannot be efficiently prepared from its constituent elements, in contrast to H_{2}Se.

== Properties ==
H_{2}Te is an endothermic compound, degrading to the elements at room temperature:

H_{2}Te → H_{2} + Te

Light accelerates the decomposition. It is unstable in air, being oxidized to water and elemental tellurium:

2 H_{2}Te + O_{2} → 2 H_{2}O + 2 Te

It is almost as acidic as phosphoric acid (K_{a} = 8.1×10^{−3}), having a K_{a} value of about 2.3×10^{−3}. It reacts with many metals to form tellurides.

== See also ==
- Dimethyl telluride
