= Potassium telluride =

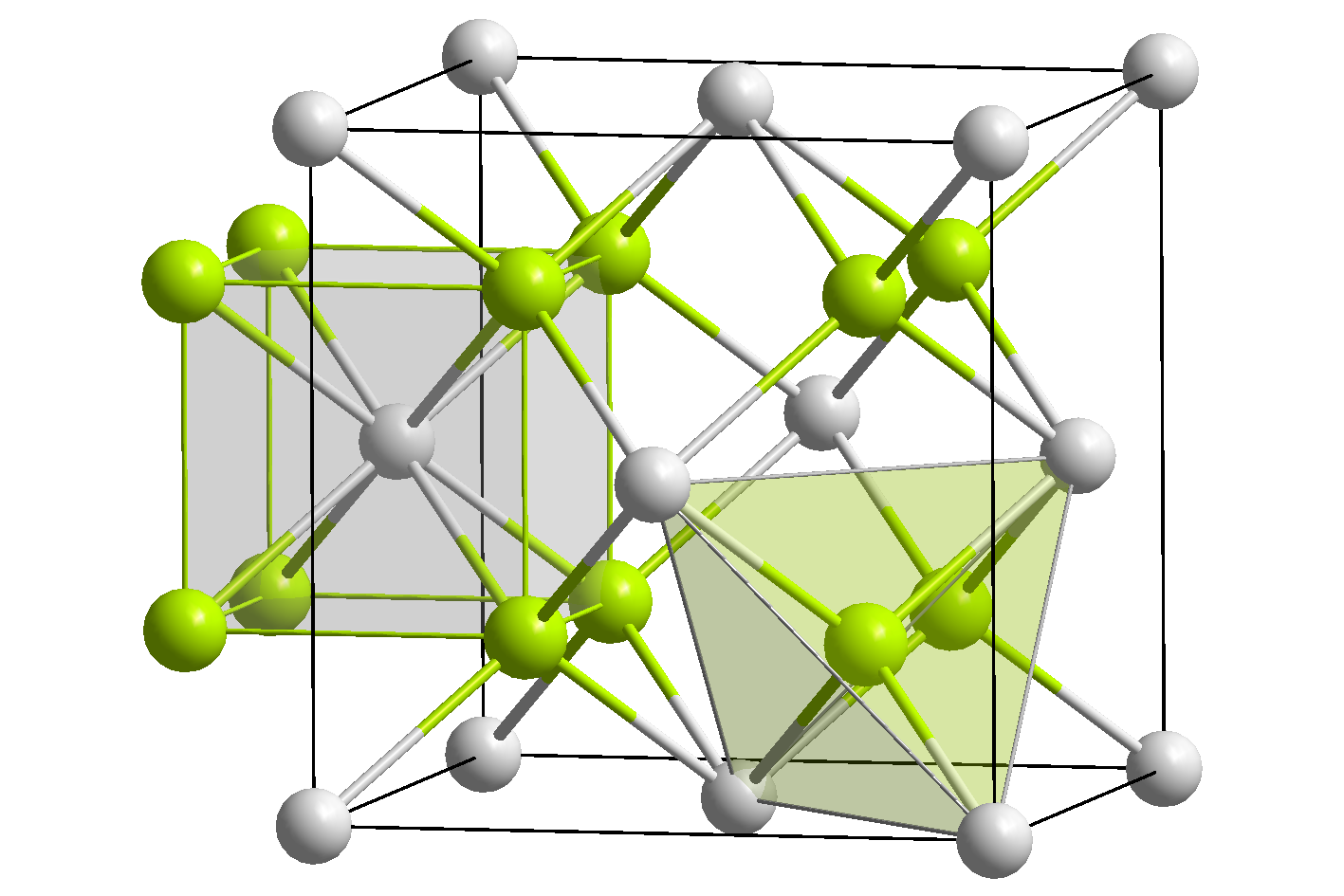
- K^{+}: __ Te^{2-}: __

Identifiers
CAS Number	12142-40-4
3D model (JSmol)	Interactive image
ChemSpider	74841
ECHA InfoCard	100.032.039
EC Number	235-256-4
PubChem CID	82942
CompTox Dashboard (EPA)	DTXSID501311453
- InChI: InChI=1S/2K.Te Key: JNKJTXHDWHQVDL-UHFFFAOYSA-N
- SMILES: [K][Te][K]

Properties
Chemical formula	K_{2}Te
Molar mass	298.64 g/mol
Appearance	pale yellow powder, turns grey when exposed to air
Melting point	874 °C

Related compounds
Other anions	Potassium oxide Potassium sulfide Potassium selenide Potassium polonide
Other cations	Lithium telluride Sodium telluride Rubidium telluride Caesium telluride
- Except where otherwise noted, data are given for materials in their standard state (at 25 °C [77 °F], 100 kPa). Infobox references

Potassium telluride is an inorganic compound with a chemical formula K_{2}Te. It is formed from potassium and tellurium, making it a telluride. Potassium telluride is a white powder. Like rubidium telluride and caesium telluride, it can be used as an ultraviolet detector in space. Its crystal structure is similar to other tellurides, which have an anti-fluorite structure.

== Production ==
Tellurium will react with melting potassium cyanide (KCN) producing potassium telluride. It can also be produced by direct combination of potassium and tellurium, usually in liquid ammonia solvent:

$$\mathrm{2 \ K + Te \longrightarrow K_2Te}$$

== Reactions ==
Adding potassium telluride to water and letting the filtrate stand in air leads to an oxidation reaction that generates potassium hydroxide (KOH) and elemental tellurium:

$$\mathrm{2 \ K_2Te + 2 \ H_2O + O_2 \longrightarrow 4 \ KOH + 2 \ Te}$$
