= Sodium telluride =

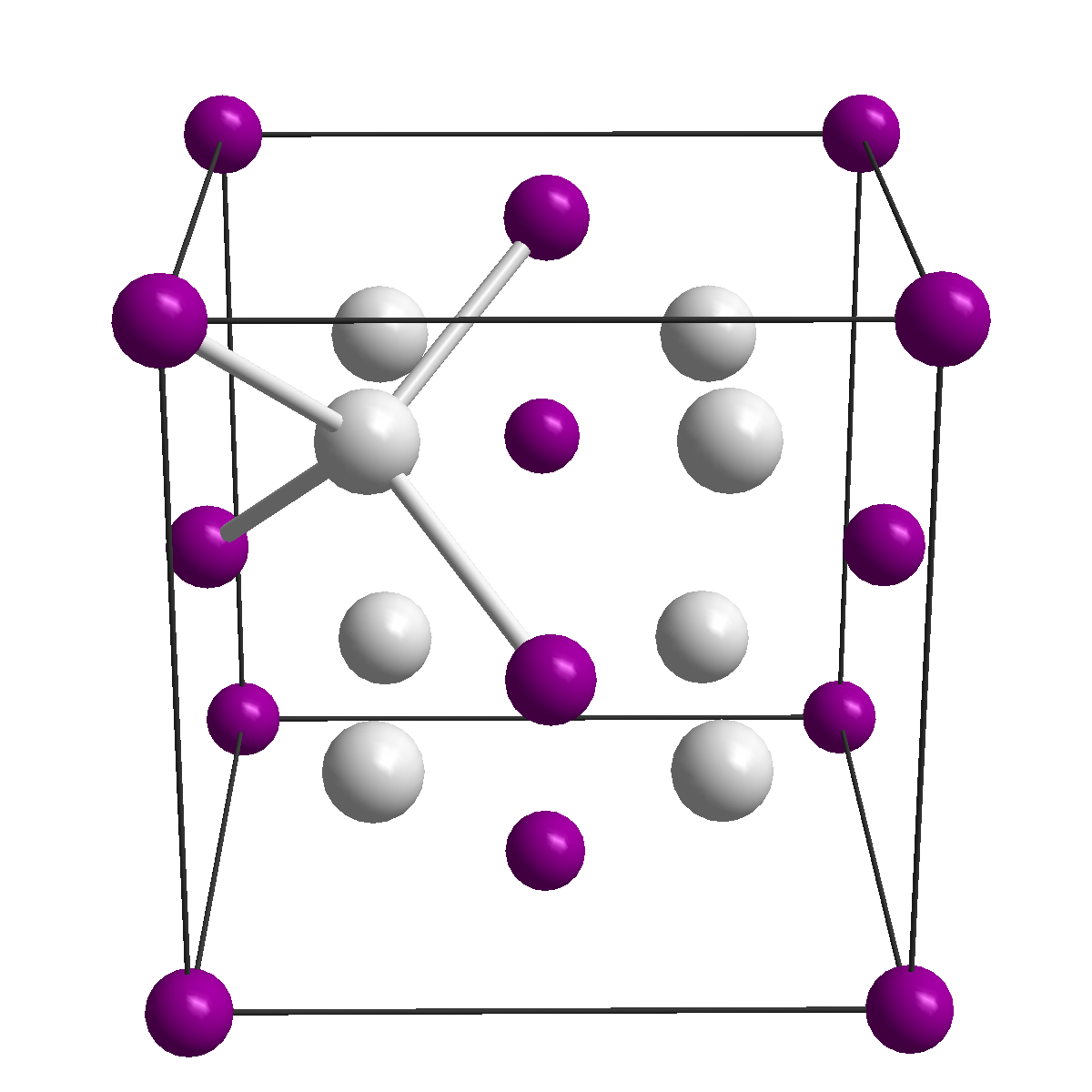
- Sodium telluride

Names
- Other names Disodium telluride; hydrotelluric acid, sodium salt

Identifiers
CAS Number	12034-41-2
3D model (JSmol)	Interactive image
ChemSpider	30988603
ECHA InfoCard	100.031.629
EC Number	234-806-0
PubChem CID	82837
CompTox Dashboard (EPA)	DTXSID80894843
- InChI: InChI=1S/2Na.Te Key: MQRWPMGRGIILKQ-UHFFFAOYSA-N
- SMILES: [Na][Te][Na]

Properties
Chemical formula	Na_{2}Te
Molar mass	173.58 g/mol
Appearance	white powder, hygroscopic
Density	2.90 g/cm^{3}, solid
Melting point	953 °C (1,747 °F; 1,226 K)
Solubility in water	very soluble

Hazards
- Occupational safety and health (OHS/OSH)
Main hazards	In contact with water releases flammable gas
- GHS labelling
Pictograms	(GHS02: Flammable) (GHS07: Exclamation mark)
Signal word	Warning
Hazard statements	H261, H302+H312+H332, H315, H319
Precautionary statements	P261, P264, P270, P271, P280, P302+P352, P304+P340, P305+P351+P338, P312, P330, P335+P334, P362, P370+P378, P402+P404, P501
NFPA 704 (fire diamond)	2 0 1

Related compounds
Other anions	Sodium oxide Sodium sulfide Sodium selenide Sodium polonide
Other cations	Hydrogen telluride Lithium telluride Potassium telluride Rubidium telluride Caesium telluride
- Except where otherwise noted, data are given for materials in their standard state (at 25 °C [77 °F], 100 kPa). verify (what is ?) Infobox references

Sodium telluride is the chemical compound with the formula Na_{2}Te. This salt is the conjugate base of the thermally unstable acid hydrogen telluride, but it is usually prepared by reduction of tellurium with sodium. Na_{2}Te is a challenging material to handle because it is very sensitive to air. Air oxidizes it initially to polytellurides, which have the formula Na_{2}Te_{x} (x > 1), and ultimately Te metal. Samples of Na_{2}Te, which are colourless when absolutely pure, generally appear purple or dark gray due to the effects of air oxidation.

== Synthesis, structure, and solution properties ==
The synthesis is typically conducted using ammonia as the solvent.

Na_{2}Te, like many related compounds with the formula M_{2}X, adopts the antifluorite structure. Thus, in solid Na_{2}Te each Te^{2−} ion is surrounded by eight Na^{+} ions and each Na^{+} ion is surrounded by four Te^{2−} ions.

Simple salts of the type M_{2}X, where X is a monatomic anion, are not typically soluble in any solvent because they have a high lattice energy. Upon addition of water - even moist air - or treatment with alcohols, Te^{2−} protonates:

Na_{2}Te + H_{2}O → NaHTe + NaOH

Because of this reaction, many processes attributed to Na_{2}Te may involve NaHTe (CAS # 65312-92-7), which is more soluble and formed readily.

== Applications in organic chemistry ==
Na_{2}Te finds use in organic synthesis, both as a reagent for reductions and as a source of Te in the synthesis of organotellurium compounds. Aryl halides are substituted to diaryl tellurides, as illustrated by the synthesis of dinaphthyltelluride:

Na_{2}Te + 2 C_{10}H_{7}I → (C_{10}H_{7})_{2}Te + 2 NaI

Na_{2}Te reacts with 1,3-diynes to give the corresponding tellurophene, which are structurally analogous to thiophenes:

Na_{2}Te + RC≡C-C≡CR + 2 H_{2}O → TeC_{4}R_{2}H_{2} + 2 NaOH

As a reducing agent, Na_{2}Te converts nitro groups to amines and will cleave certain C-X bonds.
