= Rubidium sulfide =

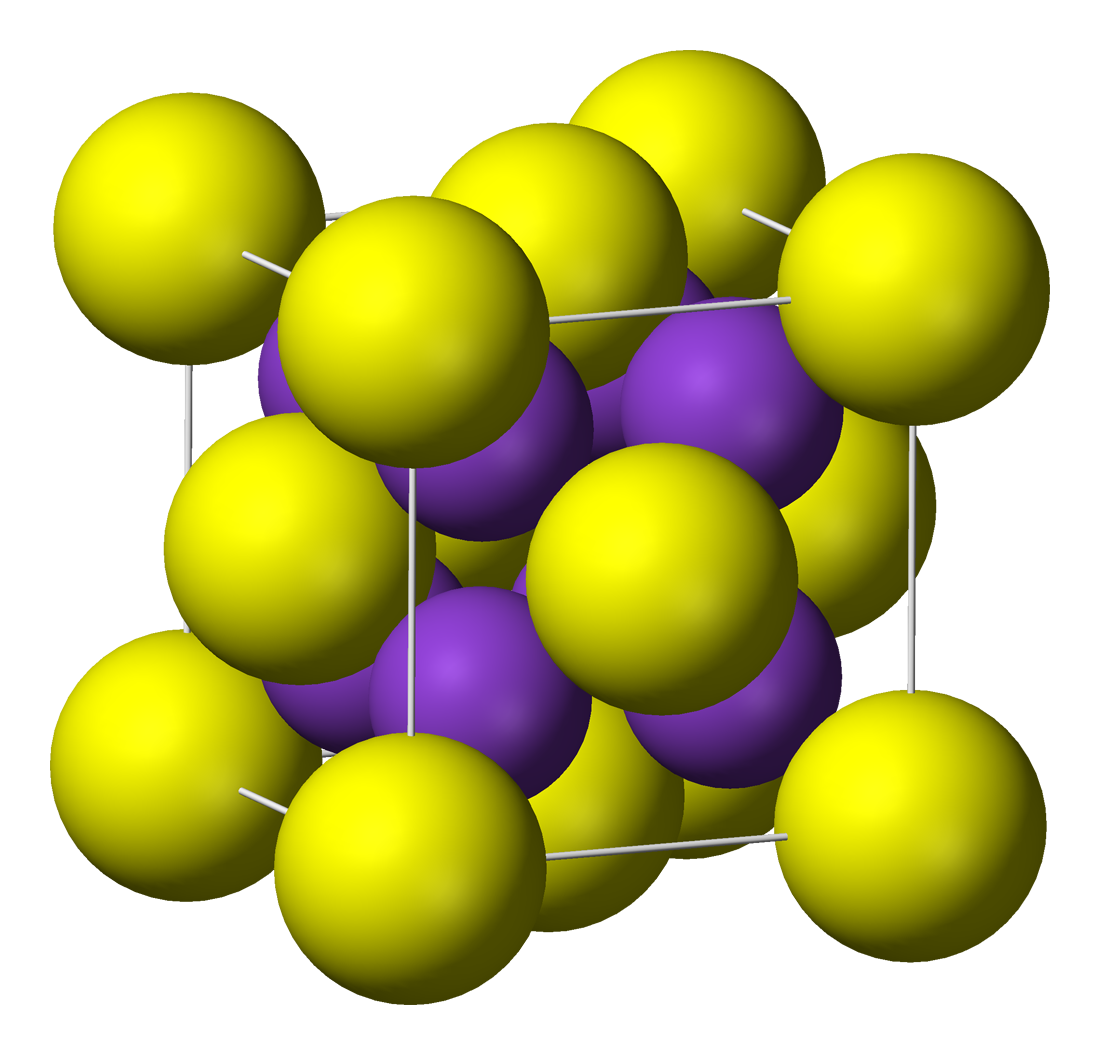
- rubidium sulfide

Names
- IUPAC name Rubidium sulfide

Identifiers
CAS Number	31083-74-6
3D model (JSmol)	Interactive image
PubChem CID	13710577
CompTox Dashboard (EPA)	DTXSID001336474
- InChI: InChI=1S/2Rb.S/q2*+1;-2 Key: AHKSSQDILPRNLA-UHFFFAOYSA-N
- SMILES: [S-2].[Rb+].[Rb+]

Properties
Chemical formula	Rb_{2}S
Molar mass	203.00
Appearance	white crystal
Density	2.912 g/cm^{3}
Melting point	530 °C
Solubility in water	hydrolyses to rubidium bisulfide
Solubility in ethanol and glycerol	soluble

Structure
Crystal structure	cubic:anti-fluorite

Hazards
- Occupational safety and health (OHS/OSH)
Main hazards	toxic
- GHS labelling
Pictograms	(GHS05: Corrosive) (GHS09: Environmental hazard)
Signal word	Danger
Hazard statements	H314, H400
Precautionary statements	P260, P264, P273, P280, P301+P330+P331, P303+P361+P353, P304+P340, P305+P351+P338, P310, P321, P363, P391, P405, P501

Related compounds
Other anions	Rubidium oxide Rubidium selenide Rubidium telluride Rubidium polonide
Other cations	Lithium sulfide Sodium sulfide Potassium sulfide Caesium sulfide Francium sulfide
- Except where otherwise noted, data are given for materials in their standard state (at 25 °C [77 °F], 100 kPa). Infobox references

Rubidium sulfide is an inorganic compound and a salt with the chemical formula Rb_{2}S. It is a white solid with similar properties to other alkali metal sulfides.

== Structure ==
Rubidium sulfide has a cubic crystal similar to lithium sulfide, sodium sulfide and potassium sulfide, known as the anti-fluorite structure. Their space groups are Fm3̅m. Rubidium sulfide has a crystal lattice unit cell dimension of a = 765.0 pm.

== Production ==
By dissolving hydrogen sulfide into rubidium hydroxide solution, it will produce rubidium bisulfide, followed by rubidium sulfide.

RbOH + H_{2}S → RbHS + H_{2}O
RbHS + RbOH → Rb_{2}S + H_{2}O

== Reactions ==
Rubidium sulfide reacts with sulfur in hydrogen gas to form rubidium pentasulfide, Rb_{2}S_{5}.
