= Rubidium selenide =

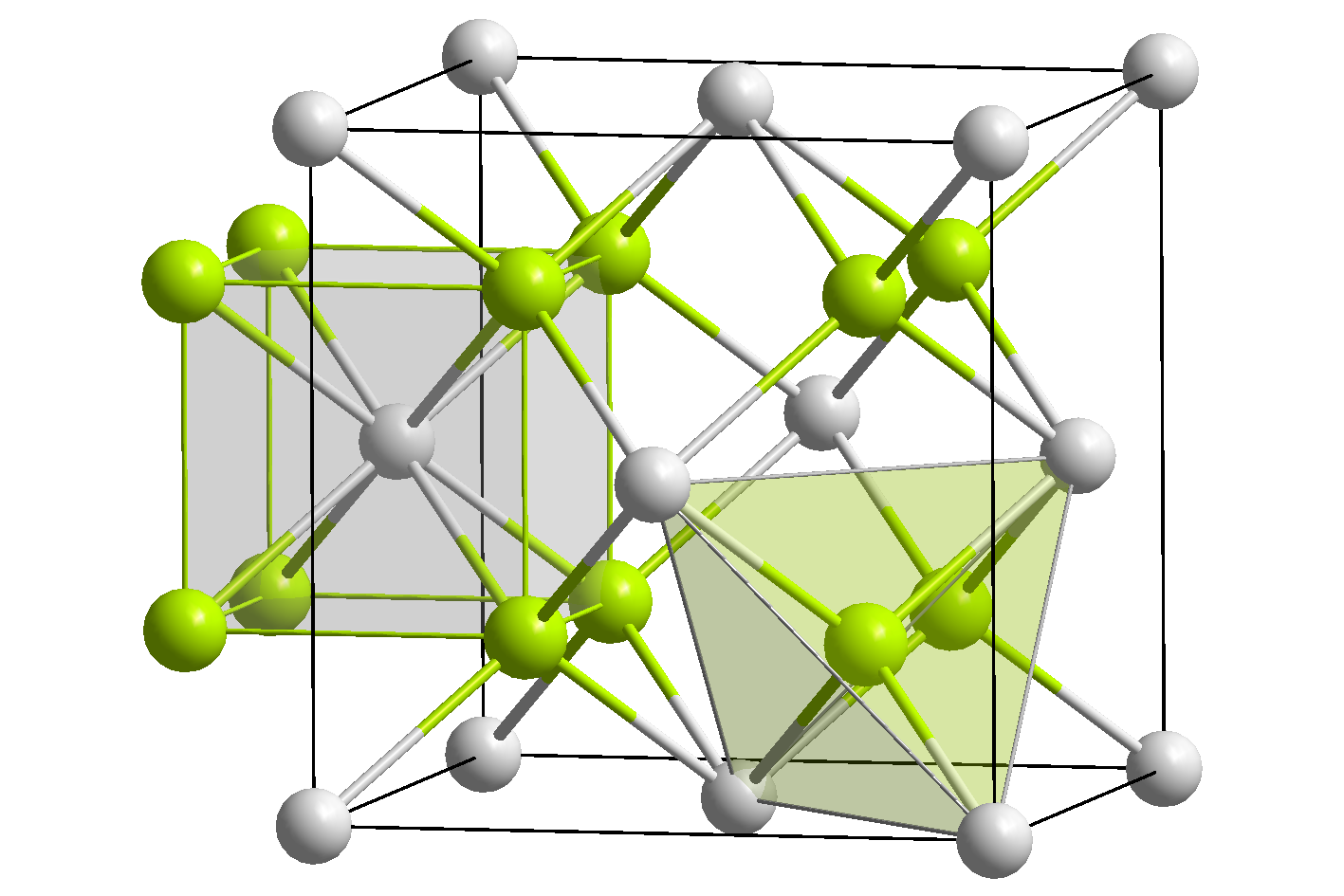
- Rb^{+}: __ Se^{2-}: __

Names
- IUPAC name Rubidium selenide

Identifiers
| CAS Number | 31052-43-4 |
| 3D model (JSmol) | Interactive image |
| ChemSpider | 148024 |
| ECHA InfoCard | 100.045.847 |
| EC Number | 250-447-2 |
| PubChem CID | 169243 |
| CompTox Dashboard (EPA) | DTXSID10953154 |
- InChI: InChI=1S/2Rb.Se/q2*+1;-2 Key: FQJOSIUDOWCYLV-UHFFFAOYSA-N
- SMILES: [Se-2].[Rb+].[Rb+]

Properties
| Chemical formula | Rb_{2}Se |
| Molar mass | 249.907 g·mol^{−1} |
| Appearance | colourless, highly hygroscopic crystals |
| Density | 2.912 g/cm^{3} 3.16 g/cm^{3} |
| Melting point | 733 °C |
| Solubility in water | hydrolyses |
| Solubility in other solvents | soluble in ethanol and glycerin |

Structure
| Crystal structure | cubic: antifluorite structure |

Hazards
- Occupational safety and health (OHS/OSH)
| Main hazards | toxic |
- GHS labelling
| Pictograms | (GHS06: Toxic) (GHS08: Health hazard) (GHS09: Environmental hazard) |
| Hazard statements | H301, H331, H373, H410 |

Related compounds
| Other anions | Rubidium oxide; Rubidium sulfide; Rubidium telluride; Rubidium polonide |
| Other cations | Lithium selenide; Sodium selenide; Potassium selenide; Caesium selenide; Francium selenide |
- Except where otherwise noted, data are given for materials in their standard state (at 25 °C [77 °F], 100 kPa). Infobox references

Rubidium selenide is an inorganic compound composed of selenium and rubidium. It is a selenide with a chemical formula of Rb_{2}Se.

== Structure ==
Rubidium selenide has cubic crystal structure, which belongs to the antifluorite structure, and the space group is $Fm\bar{3}m$ and the lattice parameters are a=801.0 pm, per unit. The unit cell has 4 units.

== Preparation ==
Rubidium selenide can be prepared by reacting mercury selenide and metallic rubidium. The elements can be synthesized in liquid ammonia.

Hydrogen selenide can also be dissolved in an aqueous solution of rubidium hydroxide to eventually form rubidium selenide. This method is similar to the method for preparing rubidium sulfide, because they are both chalcogenide compounds.

RbOH + H_{2}Se → RbHSe + H_{2}O
RbHSe + RbOH → Rb_{2}Se + H_{2}O

== Use ==
Rubidium selenide is used together with caesium selenide in photovoltaic cells.
