= Rubidium telluride =

Identifiers
| CAS Number | 12210-70-7 |
| 3D model (JSmol) | Interactive image |
| ECHA InfoCard | 100.032.159 |
| EC Number | 235-388-2 |
| PubChem CID | 82970 |
| CompTox Dashboard (EPA) | DTXSID20894847 |
- InChI: InChI=1S/2Rb.Te
- SMILES: [Rb][Te][Rb]

Properties
| Chemical formula | Rb_{2}Te |
| Molar mass | 298.54 g/mol |
| Appearance | yellow-green powder |
| Melting point | 775 °C (1,427 °F; 1,048 K) |

Related compounds
| Other anions | Rubidium oxide Rubidium sulfide Rubidium selenide Rubidium polonide |
| Other cations | Lithium telluride Sodium telluride Potassium telluride Caesium telluride |
- Except where otherwise noted, data are given for materials in their standard state (at 25 °C [77 °F], 100 kPa). verify (what is ?) Infobox references

Rubidium telluride is the inorganic compound with the formula Rb_{2}Te. It is a yellow-green powder that melts at either 775 °C or 880 °C (two different values have been reported). It is an obscure material of minor academic interest.

== Structure ==
The compound has several polymorphs. At room temperature, ω-Rb_{2}Te is a metastable antifluorite type structure, and transforms to α-Rb_{2}Te upon heating, which is a PbCl_{2} type structure.

== Preparation ==
Like other alkali metal chalcogenides, Rb_{2}Te is prepared from the elements in liquid ammonia.

== Uses ==
The National Bureau of Standards (NBS) VUV radiometric detector program used magnesium fluoride windowed photodiodes with rubidium telluride photocathodes as radiometric transfer standards.

Rubidium telluride cathodes have been used in solar-blind photomultiplier tubes for aviation applications such as remote optical atmospheric pressure and temperature sensors.
