= Caesium sulfide =

- Crystal structure of caesium sulfide at ambient pressure. Four-unit-cell fragment (left) and single unit cell (right).

Names
- IUPAC name Caesium sulfide

Identifiers
CAS Number	12214-16-3
3D model (JSmol)	Interactive image
PubChem CID	14496896
CompTox Dashboard (EPA)	DTXSID20561022
- InChI: InChI=1S/2Cs.S/q2*+1;-2 Key: QTNDMWXOEPGHBT-UHFFFAOYSA-N
- SMILES: [S-2].[Cs+].[Cs+]

Properties
Chemical formula	Cs2S
Molar mass	297.88 g/mol
Appearance	White solid; colourless crystals
Density	4.15 g/cm^{3} (25 °C)
Solubility in water	Soluble (hydrolyses)
Solubility in ethanol	soluble

Structure
Crystal structure	Orthorhombic, anticotunnite (anti-PbCl_{2}) type
Space group	Pnma (No. 62)

Related compounds
Other anions	Caesium oxide; Caesium selenide; Caesium telluride
Other cations	Lithium sulfide; Sodium sulfide; Potassium sulfide; Rubidium sulfide
- Except where otherwise noted, data are given for materials in their standard state (at 25 °C [77 °F], 100 kPa). Infobox references

Caesium sulfide is an inorganic compound with the formula Cs_{2}S. The anhydrous compound is a white, moisture-sensitive and deliquescent solid that can form colourless transparent crystals. At ambient pressure it crystallises in an orthorhombic anticotunnite structure in the space group Pnma. It dissolves in water to give basic sulfide solutions and has been used as a precursor in laboratory syntheses of complex sulfides.

== Structure and properties ==
At ambient pressure, Cs_{2}S crystallises in the orthorhombic space group Pnma (No. 62) with four formula units per unit cell, in the anticotunnite (anti-PbCl_{2}) structure. A room-temperature refinement gave lattice parameters a = 8.541(1) Å, b = 5.365(1) Å and c = 10.354(2) Å. The structure contains two crystallographically distinct caesium sites: one is coordinated by five sulfur atoms in a distorted quadrangular-pyramidal environment, while the other is tetrahedrally coordinated by four sulfur atoms. Each sulfur atom is surrounded by nine caesium atoms in a tricapped trigonal-prismatic arrangement. In contrast, Li_{2}S, Na_{2}S, K_{2}S and Rb_{2}S adopt the antifluorite structure under ambient conditions.

Anhydrous Cs_{2}S has been reported as a white powder and as colourless transparent crystals. A density of about 4.15 g cm^{−3} was measured at 25 °C; a later pycnometric determination gave 4.19 g cm^{−3}, with no measurement temperature reported. In continuously pumped vacuum, Bergmann observed the onset of melting with decomposition at 510–520 °C; the experiment did not establish an equilibrium melting point at atmospheric pressure.

Under compression, Cs_{2}S undergoes a reversible structural evolution beginning below about 1 GPa and largely developed by about 5 GPa. The high-pressure arrangement approaches a distorted Ni_{2}In-type structure while retaining Pnma symmetry, and the anticotunnite structure is recovered on decompression. The diffraction experiments were carried out without a pressure-transmitting medium, so the reported pressure range is specific to those conditions. Near 19 GPa, an additional weak diffraction reflection was observed, but its origin was not resolved.

== Preparation ==
Anhydrous caesium sulfide can be prepared directly from caesium and sulfur. In one reported synthesis, stoichiometric amounts of the elements were sealed in an evacuated quartz ampoule and heated at 623 K (350 °C) for 48 hours; the product was a white powder identified by powder X-ray diffraction. The overall reaction is

$$\ce{2 Cs + S -> Cs2S}$$

It has also been prepared by reacting elemental caesium with sulfur in liquid ammonia, which serves as the reaction medium and is removed during isolation of the product.

Historical aqueous preparations yielded hydrated material instead. By reacting hydrogen sulfide with caesium hydroxide and adjusting the hydroxide-to-sulfur ratio, solutions with an overall composition corresponding to Cs_{2}S can be prepared. Biltz and Wilke-Dörfurt crystallised the tetrahydrate Cs_{2}S·4H_{2}O from such solutions, rather than anhydrous Cs_{2}S.

== Chemical properties ==
Anhydrous Cs_{2}S is highly sensitive to atmospheric moisture and deliquesces on exposure to humid air. Deliquescence to a colourless liquid has also been observed under moist nitrogen. On dissolving in water, sulfide undergoes hydrolysis:

$$\ce{S^{2-} + H2O <=> HS^- + OH^-}$$

Because hydroxide is produced, aqueous sulfide solutions are basic; the relative amounts of S^{2−}, HS^{−} and dissolved H_{2}S depend on the solution conditions. Acidification shifts this system toward molecular hydrogen sulfide, which can be released from solution.

Heating isolated Cs_{2}S with additional sulfur can produce caesium polysulfide media. In polysulfides, sulfur occurs in S–S-bonded S_{x}^{2−} units rather than solely as isolated S^{2−} ions. Caesium hexasulfide, Cs_{2}S_{6}, is one structurally characterised example and contains open S_{6}^{2−} chains. In sulfur-rich melts, a nominal Cs_{2}S_{x} composition need not correspond to a single discrete crystalline polysulfide.

== Uses in synthesis ==
Caesium sulfide has been used as a laboratory starting material in the synthesis of complex sulfides and other sulfur-rich solids. In reactive polysulfide-flux synthesis, preformed Cs_{2}S can be combined with elemental sulfur to form a low-melting medium that functions as both reaction medium and reagent; β- and γ-CsBiS_{2} have been prepared in this way. Cs_{2}S has also been used as a stoichiometric sulfide reagent, for example in the preparation of Cs_{2}B_{2}S_{4}, and in reactions with other binary sulfides.
