= Caesium selenide =

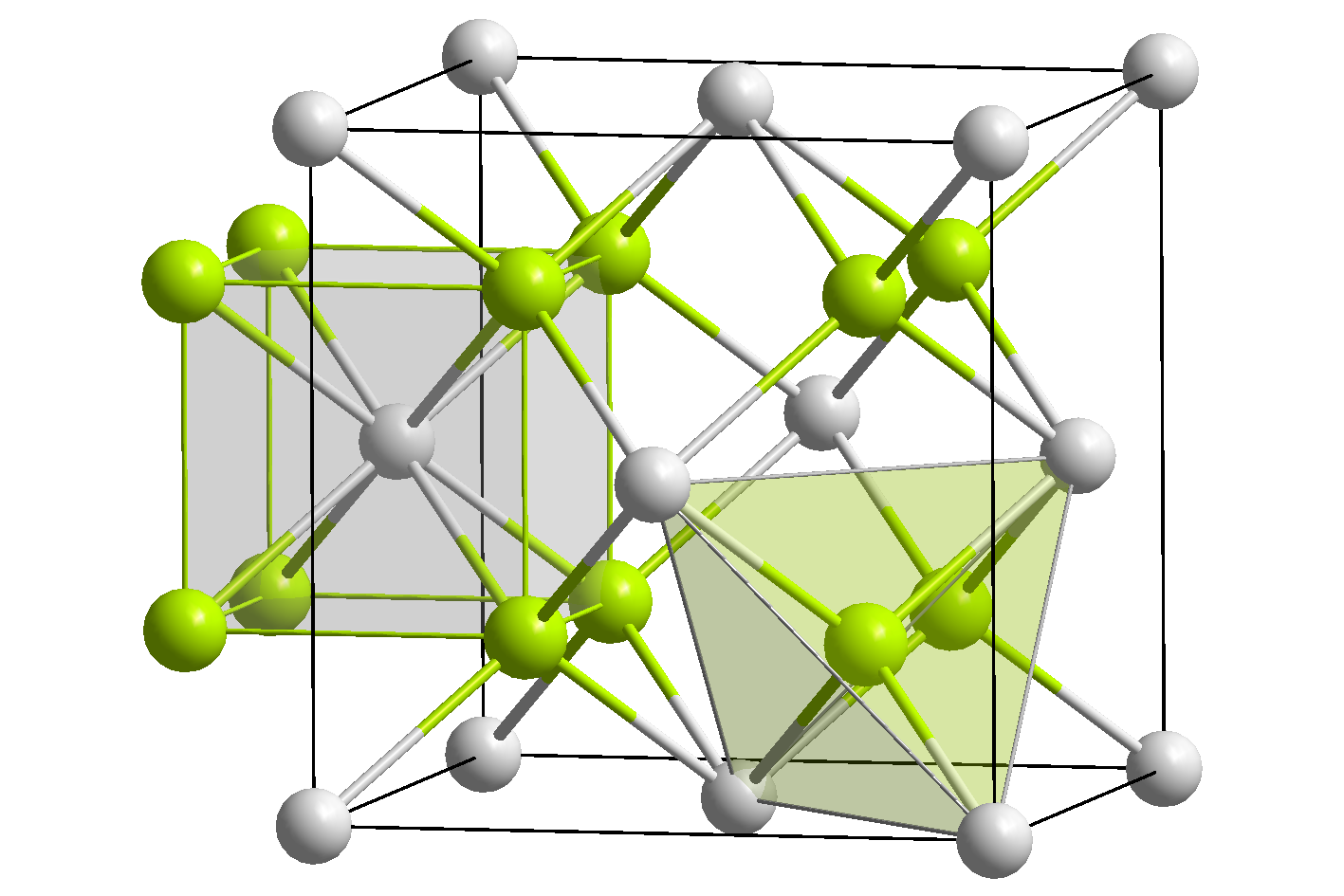
- Cs^{+}: __ Se^{2-}: __

Names
- Other names: Cesium selenide

Identifiers
CAS Number	31052-46-7
3D model (JSmol)	Interactive image
ChemSpider	148025
ECHA InfoCard	100.045.848
EC Number	250-448-8
PubChem CID	169244
CompTox Dashboard (EPA)	DTXSID70953155
- InChI: InChI=1S/2Cs.Se/q2*+1;-2 Key: KUBAIENASCDSDJ-UHFFFAOYSA-N
- SMILES: [Se-2].[Cs+].[Cs+]

Properties
Chemical formula	Cs_{2}Se
Molar mass	344.771 g/mol
Appearance	colourless, highly hygroscopic crystals
Density	4.33 g·cm^{−3}
Solubility in water	hydrolyses

Hazards
- GHS labelling
Pictograms	(GHS06: Toxic) (GHS08: Health hazard) (GHS09: Environmental hazard)
Signal word	Danger
Hazard statements	H301, H331, H373, H410

Related compounds
Other anions	Caesium oxide Caesium sulfide Caesium telluride Caesium polonide
Other cations	Lithium selenide Sodium selenide Potassium selenide Rubidium selenide
- Except where otherwise noted, data are given for materials in their standard state (at 25 °C [77 °F], 100 kPa). Infobox references

Caesium selenide is an inorganic compound with the chemical formula Cs_{2}Se. It has an inverse fluorite structure, with space group $Fm\bar{3}m$. There are 4 units per unit cell, and the other selenides from the same group are similar.

== Preparation ==
It can be prepared by reacting caesium and selenium. A mechanochemical technique utilizing reactive ball milling under an argon atmosphere has been reported.
