= Lithium sulfite =

Names
- IUPAC name Lithium sulfite
- Systematic IUPAC name Lithium sulfite; Dilithium sulfite
- Other names Lithium Sulphite

Identifiers
CAS Number	13453-87-7
3D model (JSmol)	Interactive image
ChemSpider	9840129
ECHA InfoCard	100.033.292
EC Number	236-636-2
PubChem CID	11665397
CompTox Dashboard (EPA)	DTXSID2094001
- InChI: InChI=1S/Li.H2O3S/c;1-4(2)3/h;(H2,1,2,3)/q+1;/p-1
- SMILES: [Li+].[O-]S(O)=O

Properties
Chemical formula	Li_{2}SO_{3}
Molar mass	93.943 g/mol

Hazards
- GHS labelling
Pictograms	(GHS07: Exclamation mark)
Signal word	Warning
Hazard statements	H335
Precautionary statements	P261, P271, P304+P340, P312, P403+P233, P405, P501

Related compounds
Other anions	lithium sulfate
Other cations	sodium sulfite
Related compounds	Lithium hydrogen sulfite
- Except where otherwise noted, data are given for materials in their standard state (at 25 °C [77 °F], 100 kPa). Infobox references

Lithium sulfite, or lithium sulphite, is an inorganic compound with the chemical formula Li_{2}SO_{3}.

== Preparation ==
Lithium sulfite can be prepared by treating lithium carbonate solution with sulfur dioxide. The anhydrous form can be prepared by heating the hydrate under vacuum.

It also occurs as a byproduct in the preparation of lithium sulfide from lithium hydroxide and sulfur.
