= Sodium sulfide =

Chemical compound

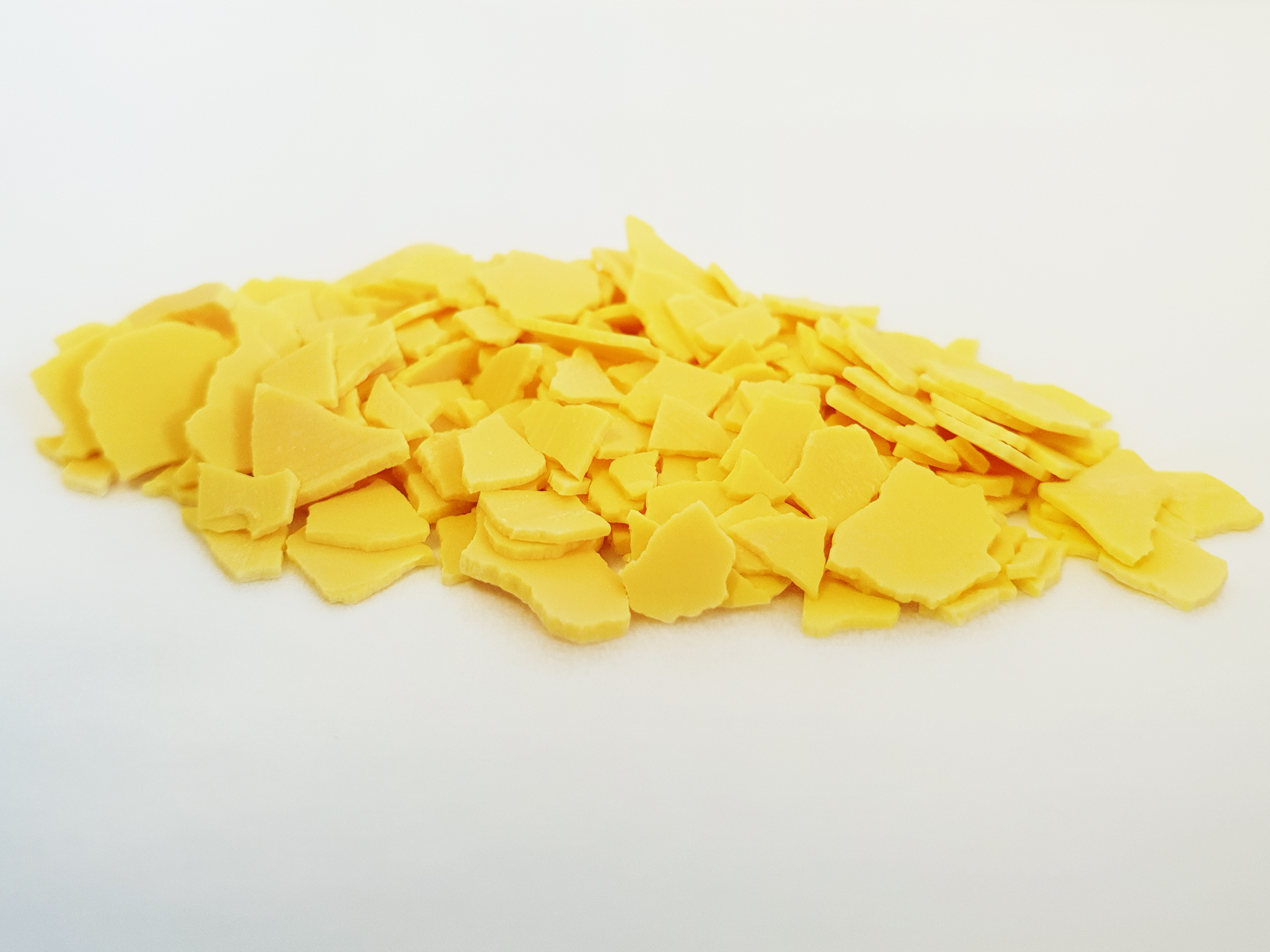

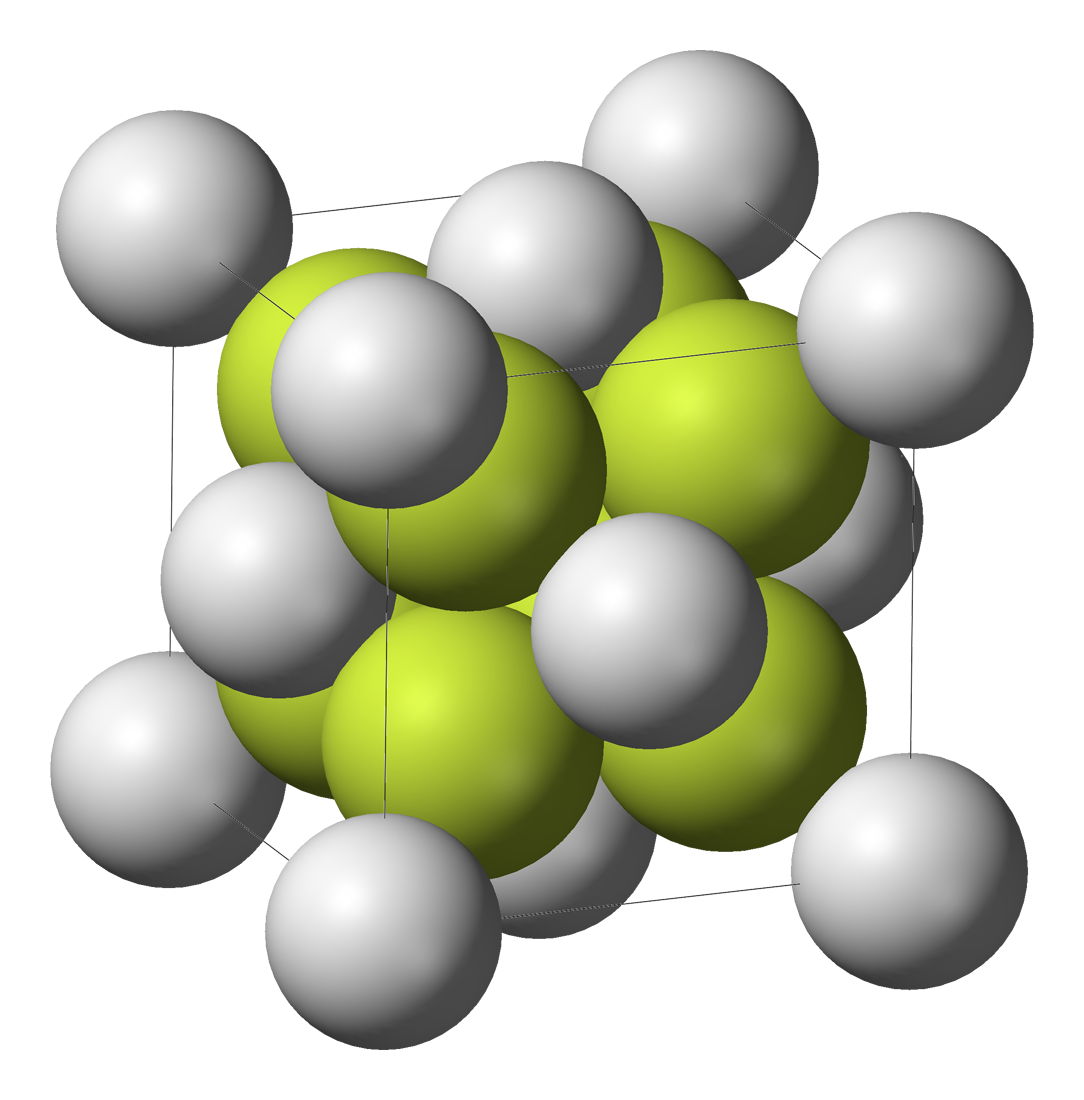

Names
- Other names Disodium sulfide

Identifiers
CAS Number	1313-82-2; 1313-83-3 (pentahydrate); 1313-84-4 (nonahydrate)
3D model (JSmol)	Interactive image
ChEBI	CHEBI:76208
ChemSpider	14120
ECHA InfoCard	100.013.829
EC Number	215-211-5
PubChem CID	14804 (anhydrous); 73972 (nonahydrate); 237873 (hydrate)
RTECS number	WE1905000
UNII	YGR27ZW0Y7; 6U55N59SZ2 (pentahydrate); C02T02993U (nonahydrate)
UN number	1385 (anhydrous); 1849 (hydrate)
CompTox Dashboard (EPA)	DTXSID0029636
- InChI: InChI=1S/2Na.S/q2*+1;-2 Key: GRVFOGOEDUUMBP-UHFFFAOYSA-N; InChI=1/2Na.S/q2*+1;-2 Key: GRVFOGOEDUUMBP-UHFFFAOYAP
- SMILES: [Na+].[Na+].[S-2]

Properties
Chemical formula	Na_{2}S
Molar mass	78.0452 g/mol (anhydrous); 240.18 g/mol (nonahydrate)
Appearance	colorless, hygroscopic solid
Odor	Foul, pungent, like that of rotten eggs (hydrolysis in atmospheric moisture to hydrogen sulfide)
Density	1.856 g/cm^{3} (anhydrous); 1.58 g/cm^{3} (pentahydrate); 1.43 g/cm^{3} (nonohydrate)
Melting point	1,176 °C (2,149 °F; 1,449 K) (anhydrous); 100 °C (pentahydrate); 50 °C (nonahydrate)
Solubility in water	12.4 g/100 mL (0 °C); 18.6 g/100 mL (20 °C); 39 g/100 mL (50 °C) (hydrolyses)
Solubility	insoluble in ether slightly soluble in alcohol
Magnetic susceptibility (χ)	−39.0·10^{−6} cm^{3}/mol

Structure
Crystal structure	Antifluorite (cubic), cF12
Space group	Fm3̅m, No. 225
Coordination geometry	Tetrahedral (Na^{+}); cubic (S^{2−})

Hazards
- GHS labelling
Pictograms	(GHS05: Corrosive) (GHS06: Toxic) (GHS07: Exclamation mark) (GHS09: Environmental hazard)
Signal word	Danger
Hazard statements	H302, H311, H314, H400
Precautionary statements	P260, P264, P270, P273, P280, P301+P312, P301+P330+P331, P302+P352, P303+P361+P353, P304+P340, P305+P351+P338, P310, P312, P321, P322, P330, P361, P363, P391, P405, P501
NFPA 704 (fire diamond)	3 1 1
Autoignition temperature	> 480 °C (896 °F; 753 K)
Safety data sheet (SDS)	ICSC 1047

Related compounds
Other anions	Sodium oxide Sodium selenide Sodium telluride Sodium polonide
Other cations	Lithium sulfide Potassium sulfide Rubidium sulfide Caesium sulfide
Related compounds	Sodium hydrosulfide
- Except where otherwise noted, data are given for materials in their standard state (at 25 °C [77 °F], 100 kPa). verify (what is ?) Infobox references

Sodium sulfide is a chemical compound with the formula Na_{2}S. More common is its hydrate Na_{2}S·9H_{2}O. Both the anhydrous and the hydrated salts are colorless solids, although technical grades of sodium sulfide are generally yellow to brick red owing to the presence of polysulfides. It is commonly supplied as a crystalline mass, in flake form, or as a fused solid. They are water-soluble, giving strongly alkaline solutions. When exposed to moisture, Na_{2}S is immediately hydrolyzed to give sodium hydrosulfide. Sodium sulfide has an unpleasant rotten egg smell due to the formation of hydrogen sulfide by hydrolysis in moist air.

Some commercial samples are described as Na_{2}S·xH_{2}O, where a weight percentage of Na_{2}S is specified. Commonly available grades have around 60% Na_{2}S by weight, which means that x is around 3. These grades of sodium sulfide are often marketed as "sodium sulfide flakes". These samples consist of NaSH, NaOH, and water.

== Structure ==
The structures of sodium sulfides have been determined by X-ray crystallography. The nonahydrate features S^{2-} hydrogen-bonded to 12 water molecules. The pentahydrate consists of S^{2-} centers bound to Na^{+} and encased by an array of hydrogen bonds. Anhydrous Na_{2}S, which is rarely encountered, adopts the antifluorite structure, which means that the Na^{+} centers occupy sites of the fluoride in the CaF_{2} framework, and the larger S^{2−} occupy the sites for Ca^{2+}.

== Production ==
Industrially Na_{2}S is produced by carbothermic reduction of sodium sulfate often using coal:

Na_{2}SO_{4} + 2 C → Na_{2}S + 2 CO_{2}

A similar process is used to regenerate sodium sulfide from sodium sulfate in the Kraft process, used to produce paper.

In the laboratory, the salt can be prepared by reduction of sulfur with sodium in anhydrous ammonia, or by sodium in dry THF with a catalytic amount of naphthalene (forming sodium naphthalenide):

2 Na + S → Na_{2}S

== Reactions with inorganic reagents ==
The sulfide ion in sulfide salts such as sodium sulfide can incorporate a proton, e.g. by hydrolysis:

S^{2−} + H_{2}O → SH^{−} + OH^{−}

When heated with oxygen and carbon dioxide, sodium sulfide can oxidize to sodium carbonate and sulfur dioxide:

2 Na_{2}S + 3 O_{2} + 2 CO_{2} → 2 Na_{2}CO_{3} + 2 SO_{2}

Oxidation with hydrogen peroxide gives sodium sulfate:

Na_{2}S + 4 H_{2}O_{2} → 4 H_{2}O + Na_{2}SO_{4}

Upon treatment with sulfur, sodium polysulfides are formed:

2 Na_{2}S + S_{8} → 2 Na_{2}S_{5}

== Pulp and paper industry ==
In terms of its dominant use, sodium sulfide is primarily used in the kraft process in the pulp and paper industry. It aids in the delignification process, affording cellulose, which is the main component of paper.

It is used in water treatment as an oxygen scavenger agent and also as a metals precipitant; in chemical photography for toning black and white photographs; in the textile industry as a bleaching agent, for desulfurising and as a dechlorinating agent; and in the leather trade for the sulfitisation of tanning extracts. It is used in chemical manufacturing as a sulfonation and sulfomethylation agent. It is used in the production of rubber chemicals, sulfur dyes and other chemical compounds. It is used in other applications including ore flotation, oil recovery, making dyes, and detergent. It is also used during leather processing, as an unhairing agent in the liming operation.

=== Reagent in organic chemistry ===
==== Installation of carbon-sulfur bonds ====
In view of its high basicity, sulfide essentially does not exist in solutions of protic solvents (water, alcohols). Nonetheless, sodium sulfide is a useful shorthand. It readily alkylates to give thioethers:

Na_{2}S + 2 RX → R_{2}S + 2 NaX

Even aryl halides participate in this reaction. Sodium sulfide can be used as nucleophile in Sandmeyer type reactions.

==== Reducing agent ====
Aqueous solution of sodium sulfide will reduce nitro groups to amine. This conversion is applied to production of some azo dyes since other reducible groups, e.g. azo group, remain intact. The reduction of nitro aromatic compounds to amines using sodium sulfide is known as the Zinin reaction in honor of its discoverer. Hydrated sodium sulfide reduces 1,3-dinitrobenzene derivatives to the 3-nitroanilines.

==== Other reactions ====
Sulfide has also been employed in photocatalytic applications.

== Safety ==
Consisting of the equivalent of sodium hydroxide, sodium sulfide is strongly alkaline and can cause chemical burns. It reacts rapidly with acids to produce hydrogen sulfide, a gas which is both highly toxic and potentially explosive. Sodium sulfide hydrolyses in water to form smaller amounts of hydrogen sulfide which also makes it very toxic to aquatic life.
