= Potassium selenide =

Inorganic compound

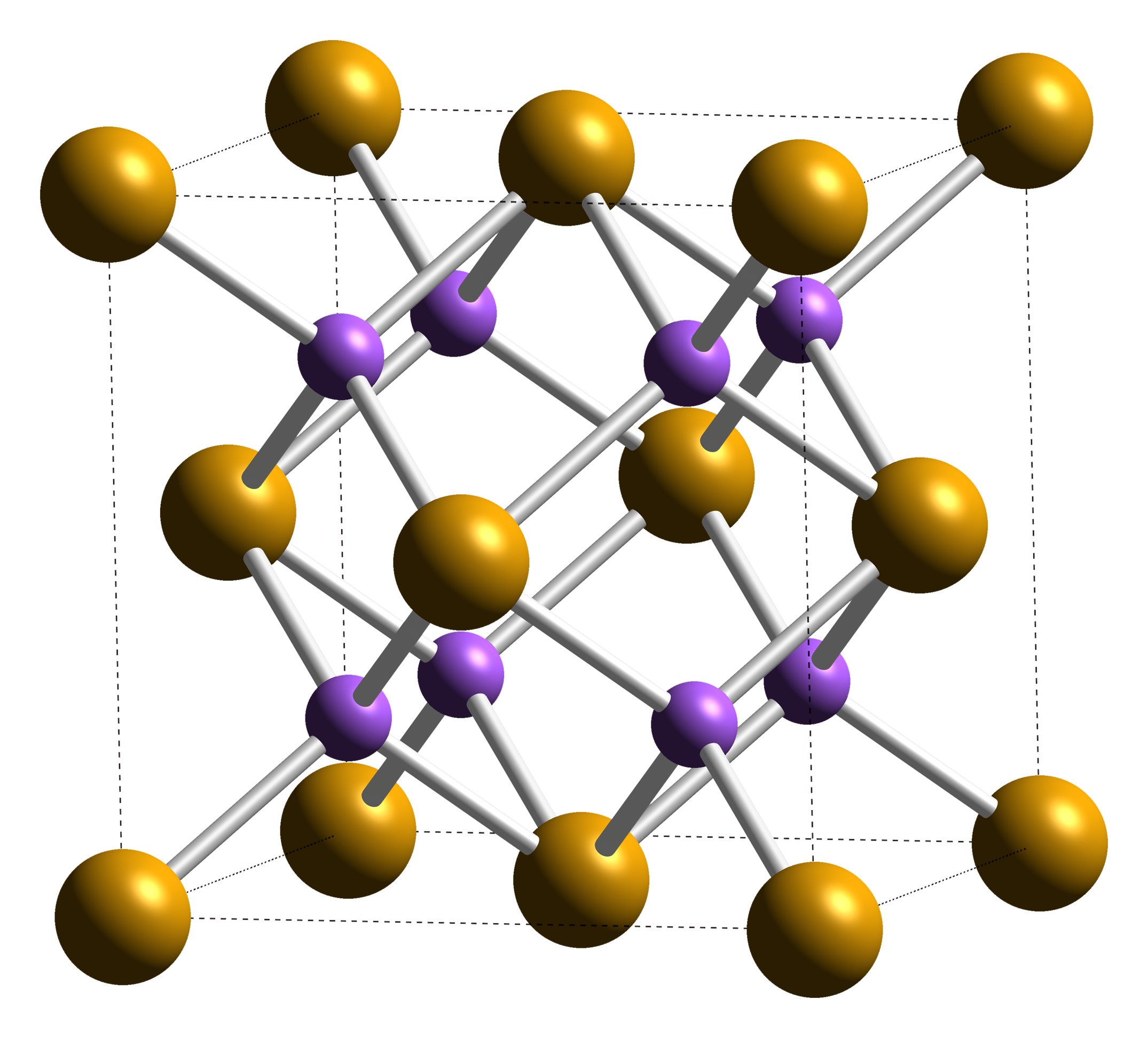

Names
- IUPAC name Potassium selenide
- Other names Dipotassium selenide

Identifiers
CAS Number	1312-74-9
3D model (JSmol)	Interactive image
ChemSpider	66596
ECHA InfoCard	100.013.817
EC Number	215-198-6
PubChem CID	73968
UNII	5B5516VCNR
CompTox Dashboard (EPA)	DTXSID6061658
- InChI: InChI=1S/2K.Se/q2*+1;-2 Key: VZZSRKCQPCSMRS-UHFFFAOYSA-N
- SMILES: [K+].[K+].[Se-2]

Properties
Chemical formula	K_{2}Se
Molar mass	157.16
Appearance	clearish wet crystal
Density	2.29 g/cm^{3}
Melting point	800 °C (1,470 °F; 1,070 K)
Solubility in water	reacts

Structure
Crystal structure	cubic: antifluorite

Hazards
- Occupational safety and health (OHS/OSH)
Main hazards	toxic
- GHS labelling
Pictograms	(GHS06: Toxic) (GHS08: Health hazard) (GHS09: Environmental hazard)
Signal word	Danger
Hazard statements	H301, H331, H373, H410
Precautionary statements	P260, P262, P264, P270, P271, P273, P280, P284, P301+P310, P304+P340, P310, P314, P320, P321, P330, P361, P363, P391, P403+P233, P405, P501

Related compounds
Other anions	Potassium oxide Potassium sulfide Potassium telluride Potassium polonide
Other cations	Lithium selenide Sodium selenide Rubidium selenide Caesium selenide
Related compounds	Potassium selenate
- Except where otherwise noted, data are given for materials in their standard state (at 25 °C [77 °F], 100 kPa). Infobox references

Potassium selenide (K_{2}Se) is an inorganic compound formed from selenium and potassium.

== Production ==
It can be produced by the reaction of selenium and potassium. If the two are combined in liquid ammonia, the purity is higher.

== Crystal structure ==
Potassium selenide has a cubic, antifluorite crystal structure.
