= Lithium selenide =

Chemical compound

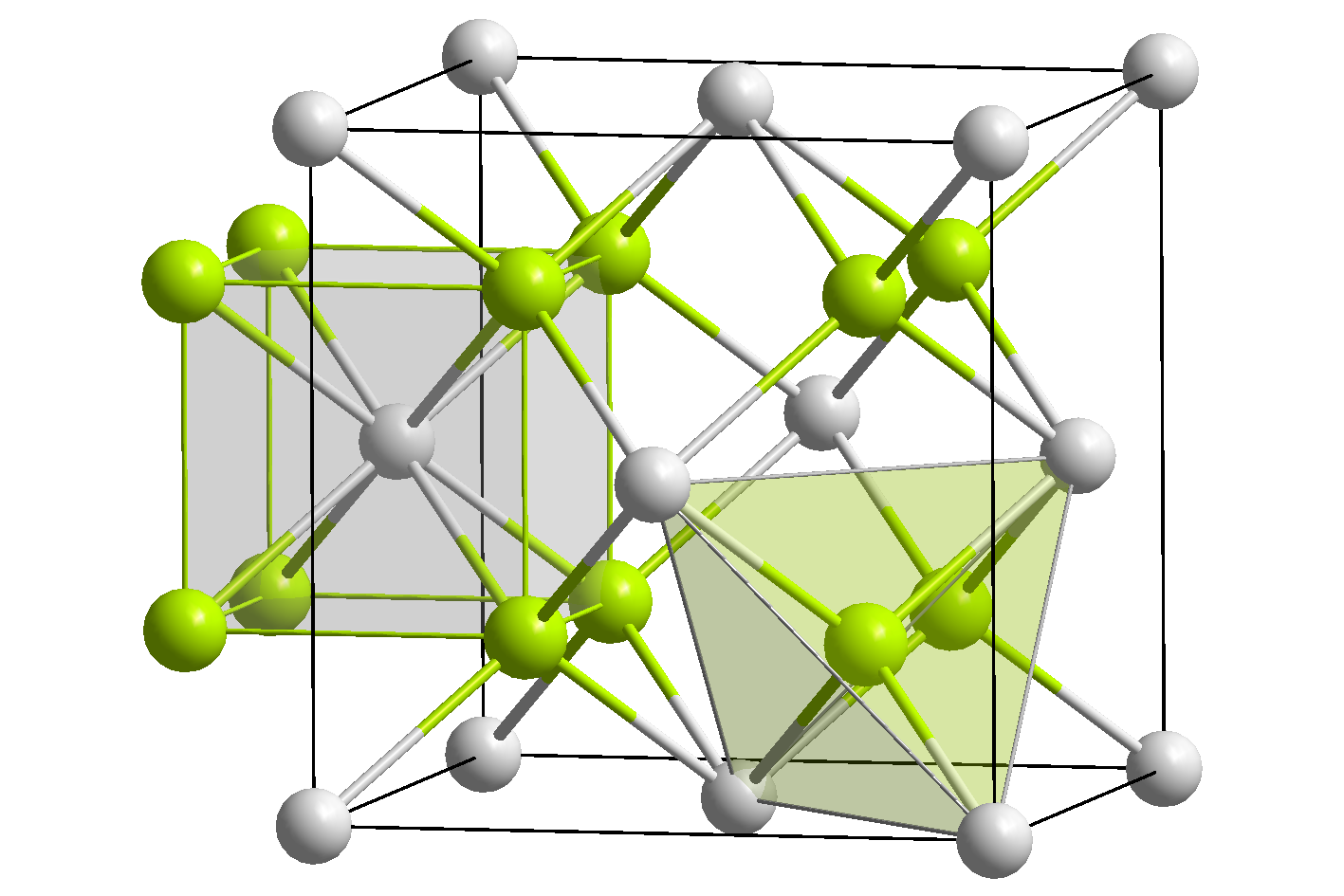
- Crystal structure of lithium selenide __ Li^{+} __ Se^{2-}

Names
- IUPAC name Lithium selenide

Identifiers
CAS Number	12136-60-6
3D model (JSmol)	Interactive image
ChemSpider	74834
ECHA InfoCard	100.032.015
EC Number	235-230-2
PubChem CID	82935
UNII	7ZFO96D8JS
CompTox Dashboard (EPA)	DTXSID2065252
- InChI: InChI=1S/2Li.Se Key: PEXNRZDEKZDXPZ-UHFFFAOYSA-N
- SMILES: [Li][Se][Li]

Properties
Chemical formula	Li_{2}Se
Molar mass	92.842
Appearance	clear crystal
Density	2.0 g/cm^{3}
Melting point	1,302 °C (2,376 °F; 1,575 K)
Solubility in water	hydrolysis

Structure
Crystal structure	cubic: anti-fluorite
Space group	Fm3̅m, No. 225
Formula units (Z)	4

Hazards
- GHS labelling
Pictograms	(GHS02: Flammable) (GHS06: Toxic) (GHS08: Health hazard) (GHS09: Environmental hazard)
Signal word	Danger
Hazard statements	H261, H301, H331, H373, H410
Precautionary statements	P231+P232, P260, P264, P270, P271, P273, P280, P301+P310, P304+P340, P311, P314, P321, P330, P370+P378, P391, P402+P404, P403+P233, P405, P501

Related compounds
Other anions	Lithium oxide Lithium sulfide Lithium telluride Lithium polonide
Other cations	Sodium selenide Potassium selenide Rubidium selenide Caesium selenide
- Except where otherwise noted, data are given for materials in their standard state (at 25 °C [77 °F], 100 kPa). Infobox references

Lithium selenide is an inorganic compound that formed by selenium and lithium. It is a selenide with a chemical formula Li_{2}Se. Lithium selenide has the same crystal form as other selenides, which is cubic, belonging to the anti-fluorite structure, the space group is $Fm\bar{3}m$, each unit cell has 4 units.

== Synthesis ==
Lithium Selenide can be synthesized via the reaction between 1.0 equivalents of grey elemental selenium and 2.1 equivalents of lithium trialkylborohydride. The reaction takes place in a solution of THF (tetrahydrofuran) under with stirring (minimum of 20 minutes) at room temperature according to the reaction below: To increase yields and harmful byproducts, naphthalene can be added to the reaction as a catalyst.

Se + 2Li(C_{2}H_{5})_{3}BH → Li_{2}Se + 2(C_{2}H_{5})_{3}B + H_{2}

Another method of synthesis involves the reduction of selenium with lithium in liquid ammonia. The Li_{2}Se can be extracted after evaporation of the ammonia.

== Uses ==
One of the most contemporary uses of Li_{2}Se compounds is in the creation of high-density capacitors and batteries. Lithium selenide can act as an excellent prelithiation agent, which helps to prevent the loss of capacity and efficiency during the formation of the solid electrolyte interphase (SEI). Additionally, the high relative conductivity and solubility of the products of lithium selenide decomposition makes it an ideal prelithiation agent. No harmful byproducts or gases are created during this decomposition of Li_{2}Se. One potential drawback to the use of Li_{2}Se is the dissolution and shuttle problems inherent to the transition metals like selenide. To avoid this problem, evolving heterostructure materials can be used to inhibit the dissolution and shuttle effects of Li_{2}Se.
