= Harker diagram =

Diagram of oxides content in rocks

In geology, a Harker diagram, a type of a variation diagram, is a plot of oxides of elements found in rocks vs. their silica content.

Typically, in igneous rocks, as silica content increases, iron, magnesium, calcium and titanium oxides decrease in abundance. In contrast, oxides of alkali metals such as Na_{2}O and K_{2}O increase in abundance as silica content increases, while aluminium and phosphorus oxides tend to increase in abundance and then fall.

Such diagrams are used as a visualization tool for exploring the fractionation history of igneous rocks.
