= Potassium sulfide =

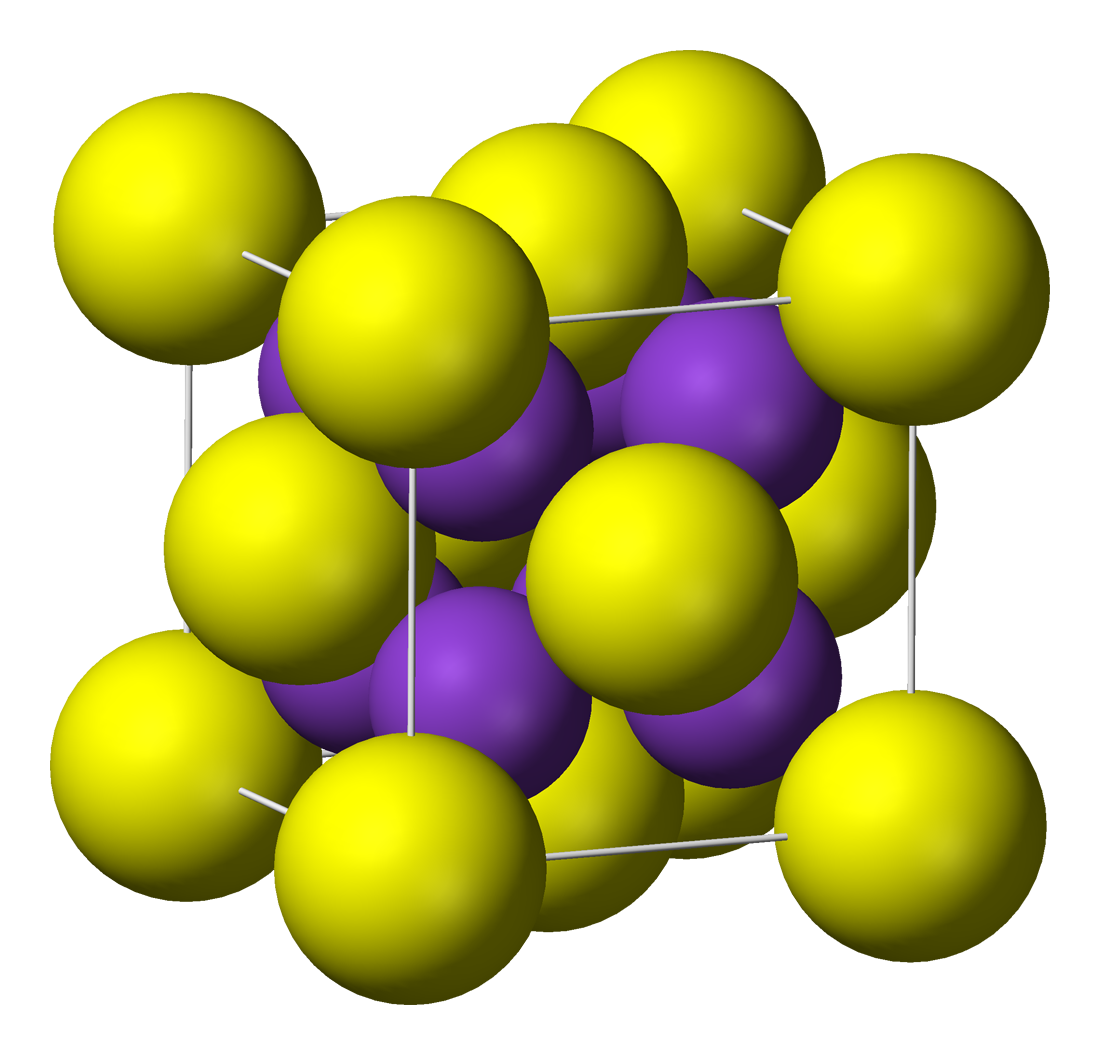
- Potassium sulfide

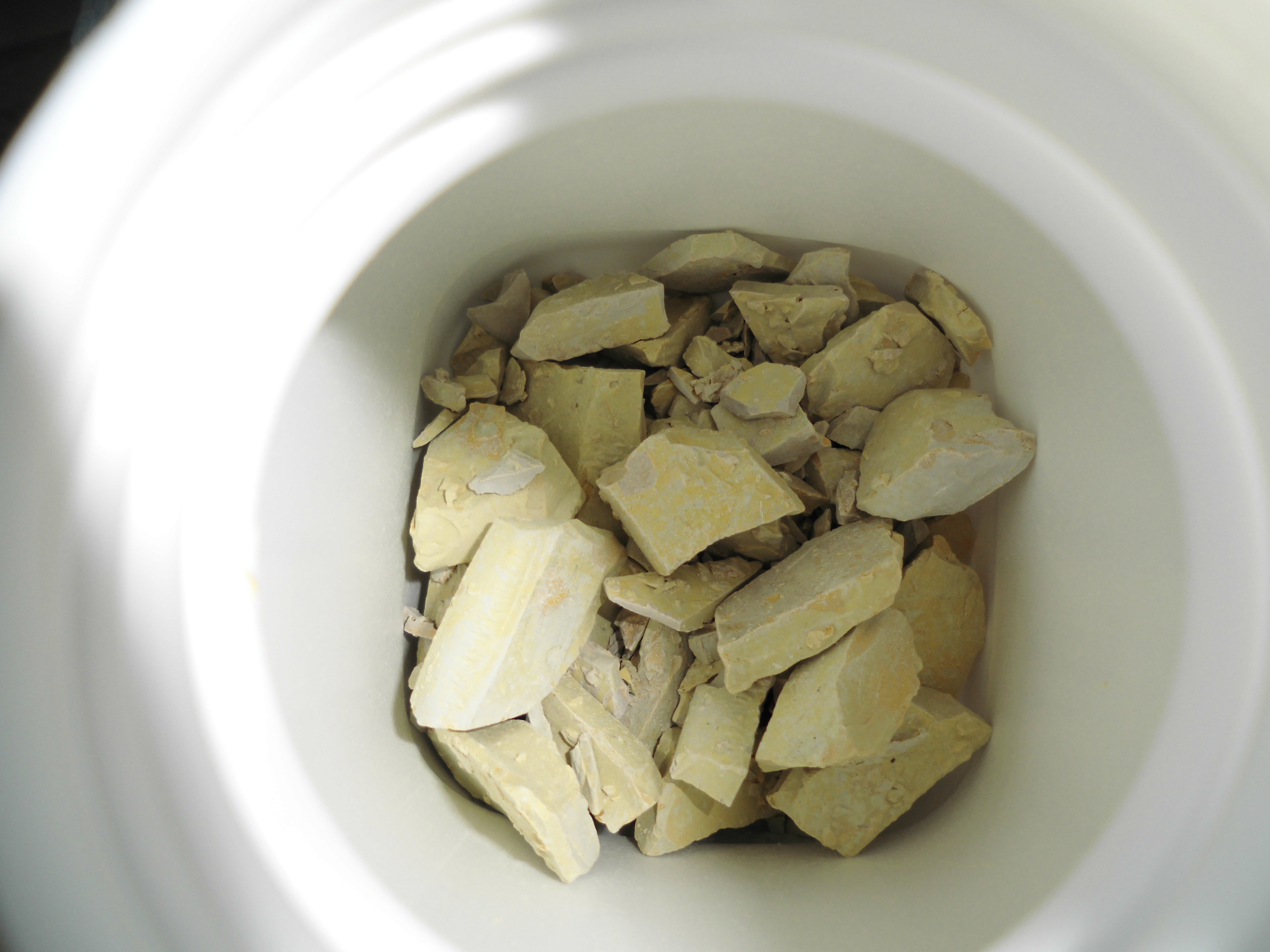

Names
- IUPAC name Potassium sulfide
- Other names Dipotassium monosulfide, Dipotassium sulfide, Potassium monosulfide, Potassium sulfide

Identifiers
CAS Number	1312-73-8
3D model (JSmol)	Interactive image
ChemSpider	142491
ECHA InfoCard	100.013.816
EC Number	215-197-0
PubChem CID	162263
RTECS number	TT6000000
UNII	31R0R7HD0N
UN number	1847 1382
CompTox Dashboard (EPA)	DTXSID70909738
- InChI: InChI=1S/2K.S/q2*+1;-2 Key: DPLVEEXVKBWGHE-UHFFFAOYSA-N
- SMILES: [S-2].[K+].[K+]

Properties
Chemical formula	K_{2}S
Molar mass	110.262 g/mol
Appearance	pure: colourless impure: yellow-brown
Odor	H_{2}S
Density	1.74 g/cm^{3}
Melting point	840 °C (1,540 °F; 1,110 K)
Boiling point	912 °C (1,674 °F; 1,185 K) (decomposes)
Solubility in water	converts to KSH, KOH
Solubility in other solvents	soluble in ethanol, glycerol insoluble in ether
Magnetic susceptibility (χ)	−60.0·10^{−6} cm^{3}/mol

Structure
Crystal structure	antifluorite

Thermochemistry
Std molar entropy (S^{⦵}_{298})	105.00 J·mol^{−1}·K^{−1}
Std enthalpy of formation (Δ_{f}H^{⦵}_{298})	−406.2 kJ·mol^{−1}
Gibbs free energy (Δ_{f}G^{⦵})	−392.4 kJ·mol

Hazards
- Occupational safety and health (OHS/OSH)
Main hazards	Causes skin burns. Dangerous for the environment
- GHS labelling
Pictograms	(GHS05: Corrosive) (GHS09: Environmental hazard)
Signal word	Danger
Hazard statements	H314, H400
Precautionary statements	P260, P264, P273, P280, P301+P330+P331, P303+P361+P353, P304+P340, P305+P351+P338, P310, P321, P363, P391, P405, P501

Related compounds
Other anions	Potassium oxide Potassium selenide Potassium telluride Potassium polonide
Other cations	Lithium sulfide Sodium sulfide Rubidium sulfide Caesium sulfide
Related compounds	Potassium hydrosulfide Potassium sulfite Potassium sulfate Iron(II) sulfide
- Except where otherwise noted, data are given for materials in their standard state (at 25 °C [77 °F], 100 kPa). verify (what is ?) Infobox references

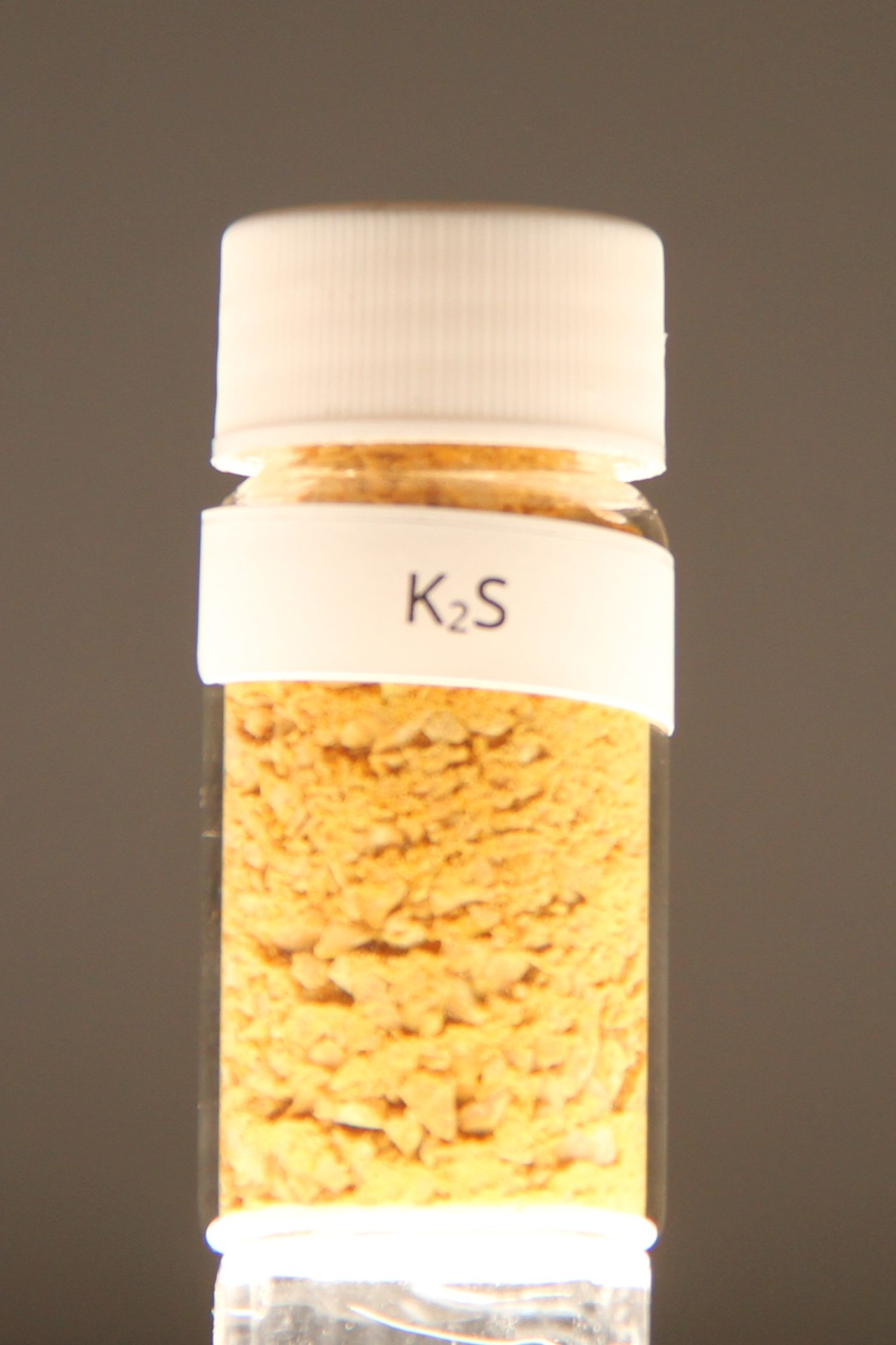
Powdered potassium sulfide anhydrous

Potassium sulfide is an inorganic compound with the formula K_{2}S. The colourless solid is rarely encountered, because it reacts readily with water, a reaction that produces potassium hydrosulfide (KSH) and potassium hydroxide (KOH). Most commonly, the term potassium sulfide refers loosely to this mixture, not the anhydrous solid.

== Structure ==
It adopts an antifluorite structure, which means that the small K^{+} ions occupy the tetrahedral (F^{−}) sites in fluorite, and the larger S^{2−} centers occupy the eight-coordinate sites. Li_{2}S, Na_{2}S, and Rb_{2}S crystallize similarly.

== Synthesis and reactions ==
It can be produced by heating K_{2}SO_{4} with carbon (coke):

K_{2}SO_{4} + 4 C → K_{2}S + 4 CO

In the laboratory, pure K_{2}S may be prepared by the reaction of potassium and sulfur in anhydrous ammonia.

Sulfide is highly basic, so K_{2}S completely and irreversibly hydrolyzes in water according to the following equation:

K_{2}S + H_{2}O → KOH + KSH

For many purposes, this reaction is inconsequential since the mixture of SH^{−} and OH^{−} behaves as a source of S^{2−}. Other alkali metal sulfides behave similarly.

Potassium polysulfides can be synthesized by reaction of K and S in different ratios:

2 K + 3 S → K_{2}S_{3}

== Use in fireworks ==
Potassium sulfides are formed when black powder is burned and are important intermediates in many pyrotechnic effects, such as senko hanabi and some glitter formulations.

== See also ==
- Liver of sulfur
