= Lithium tritelluride =

Identifiers
CAS Number	39327-86-1
3D model (JSmol)	Interactive image
- InChI: InChI=1S/Li.3H2Te/h;3*1H2 Key: AVUONMXBLBDKIN-UHFFFAOYSA-N
- SMILES: [Li].[Te].[Te].[Te]

Properties
Chemical formula	LiTe_{3}
Molar mass	389.74 g·mol^{−1}

Related compounds
Related compounds	lithium telluride
- Except where otherwise noted, data are given for materials in their standard state (at 25 °C [77 °F], 100 kPa). Infobox references

Lithium tritelluride is an intercalary compound of lithium and tellurium with empirical formula LiTe_{3}. It is one of four known members of the Li-Te system, the others being the raw metals and lithium telluride (Li_{2}Te).

LiTe_{3} was first discovered in 1969 by researchers at the US Atomic Energy Commission. Research into the compound has been primarily driven by the possibility of using molten tellurium salts to cool a nuclear reactor.

Lithium tritelluride can be synthesized by heating a mixture of the appropriate stoichiometry. It is unstable below 304 °C; if left below that temperature, it will decompose, releasing tellurium vapor.

Structurally, lithium tritelluride is composed of parallel graphene-like planes of tellurium. Atoms in these planes are aligned to form "vertical" columns of tellurium; the lithium ions then form columns running through the center of each tellurium hexagon.
