= Sodium selenide =

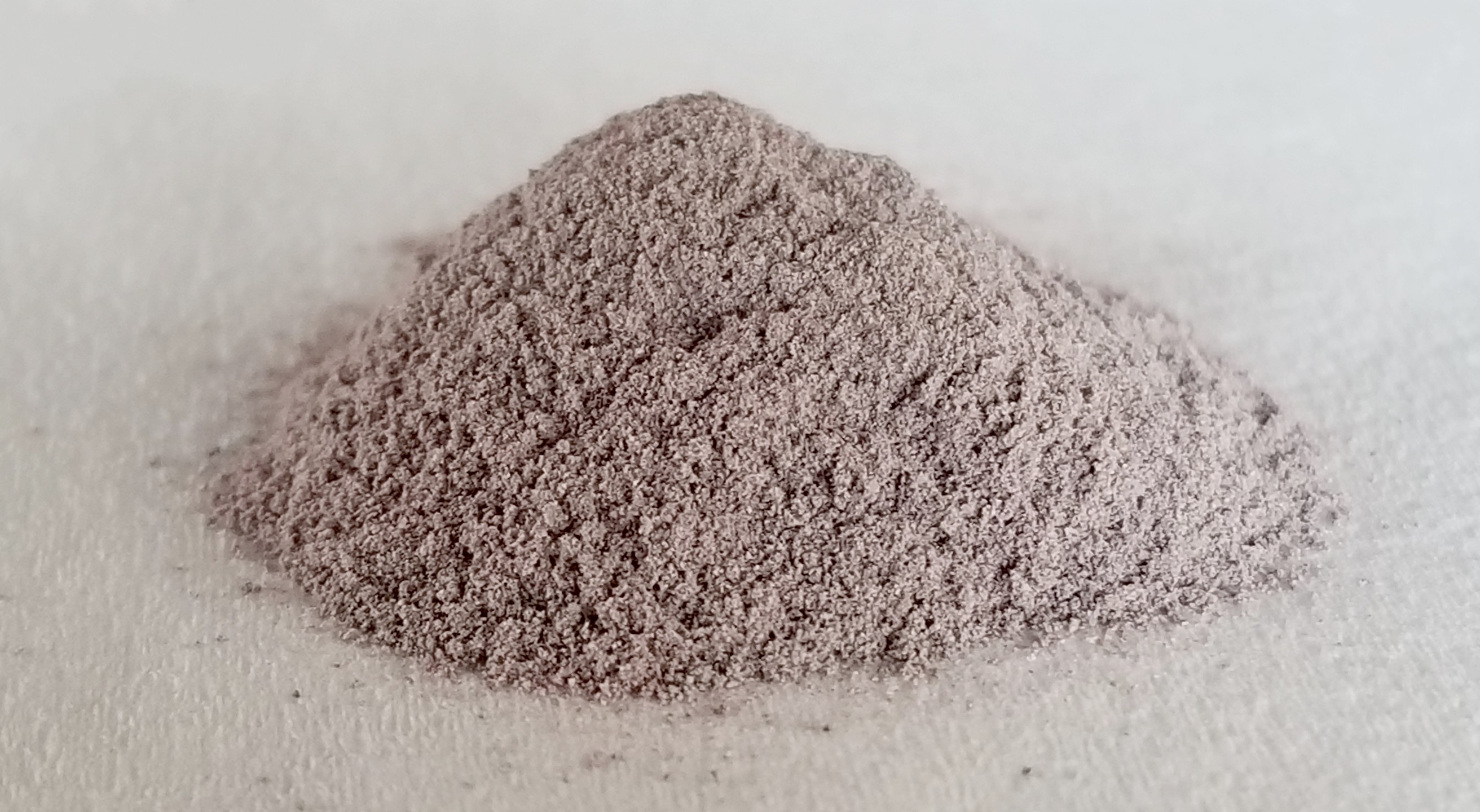

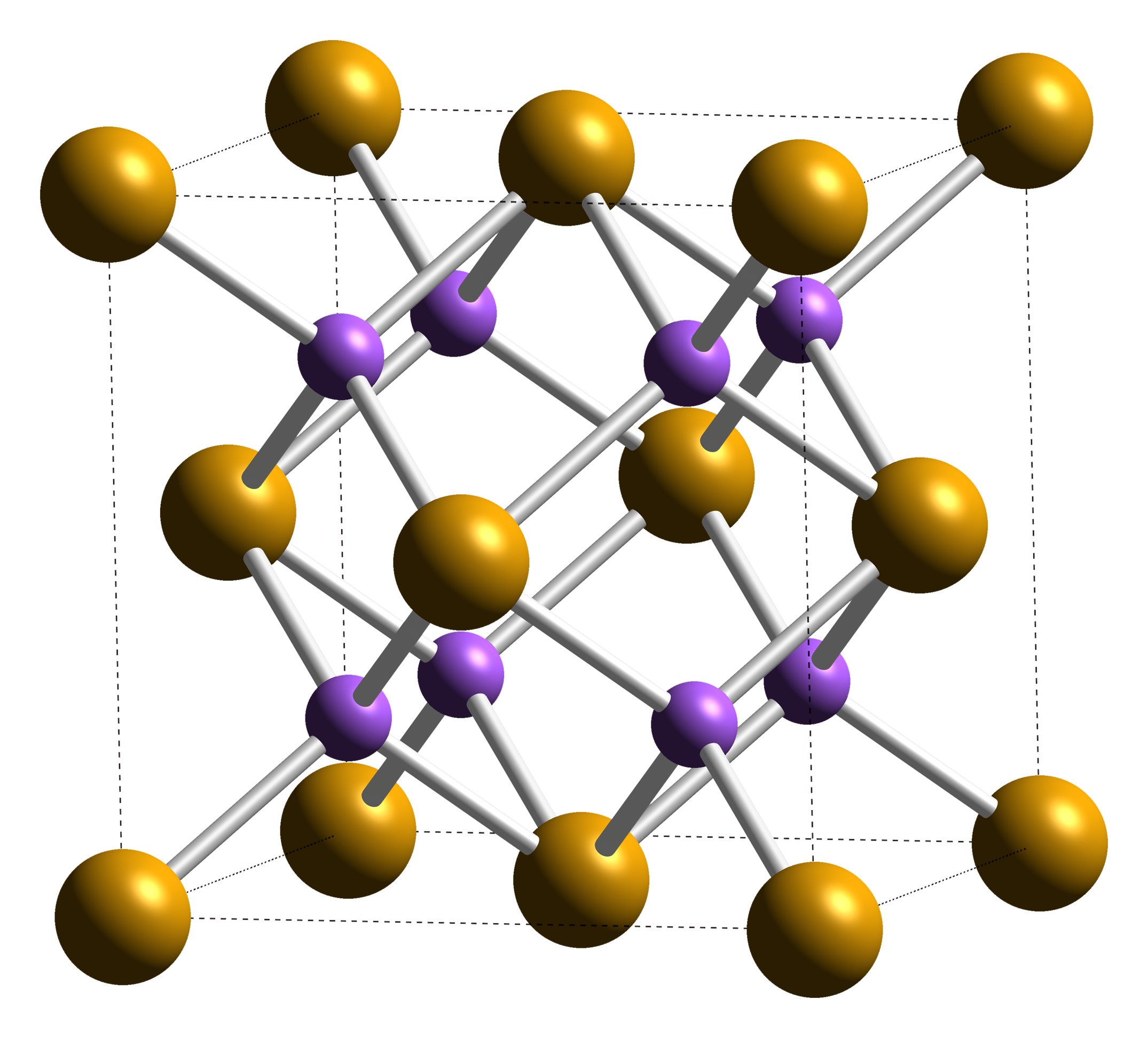

Names
- IUPAC name sodium selenide

Identifiers
CAS Number	1313-85-5
3D model (JSmol)	Interactive image
ChEBI	CHEBI:77773
ChemSpider	66601
ECHA InfoCard	100.013.830
EC Number	215-212-0
PubChem CID	73973
UNII	1FEK1K7WCE
CompTox Dashboard (EPA)	DTXSID5061661
- InChI: InChI=1S/2Na.Se/q2*+1;-2 Key: VPQBLCVGUWPDHV-UHFFFAOYSA-N
- SMILES: [Na+].[Na+].[Se-2]

Properties
Chemical formula	Na_{2}Se
Molar mass	124.951 g·mol^{−1}
Density	2.62 g cm^{−3}
Melting point	>875 °C
Solubility in water	reacts with water

Structure
Crystal structure	Cubic (fluorite), cF12
Space group	Fm3̅m, No. 225
Lattice constant	a = 0.6825 nm
Formula units (Z)	4

Hazards
- GHS labelling
Pictograms	(GHS06: Toxic) (GHS08: Health hazard) (GHS09: Environmental hazard)
Signal word	Danger
Hazard statements	H301, H331, H373, H410
Precautionary statements	P260, P264, P270, P271, P273, P301+P310, P304+P340, P311, P314, P321, P330, P391, P403+P233, P405, P501

Related compounds
Other anions	Sodium oxide Sodium sulfide Sodium telluride Sodium polonide
Other cations	Hydrogen selenide Lithium selenide Potassium selenide Rubidium selenide Caesium selenide
Related compounds	Sodium selenite Sodium selenate Aluminum selenide Antimony selenide
- Except where otherwise noted, data are given for materials in their standard state (at 25 °C [77 °F], 100 kPa). verify (what is ?) Infobox references

Sodium selenide is an inorganic compound of sodium and selenium with the chemical formula Na_{2}Se.

== Preparation ==
This colourless solid is prepared by the reaction of selenium with a solution of sodium in liquid ammonia at −40 °C. Alternatively, sodium selenide can be prepared by the reaction of gaseous hydrogen selenide with metallic sodium at 100 °C.

== Reactions ==
Like other alkali metal chalcogenides, this material is highly sensitive to water, easily undergoing hydrolysis to give mixtures of sodium biselenide (NaSeH) and hydroxide. This hydrolysis occurs because of the extreme basicity of the Se^{2−} ion.

Na_{2}Se + H_{2}O → NaHSe + NaOH

Similarly, sodium selenide is readily oxidized to polyselenides, a conversion signaled by off-white samples.

Sodium selenide reacts with acids to produce toxic hydrogen selenide gas.

Na_{2}Se + 2 HCl → H_{2}Se + 2 NaCl

The compound reacts with electrophiles to produce the selenium compounds. With alkyl halides, one obtains a variety of organoselenium compounds:

Na_{2}Se + 2 RBr → R_{2}Se + 2 NaBr

Organotin and organosilicon halides react similarly to give the expected derivatives:

Na_{2}Se + 2 Me_{3}XCl → (Me_{3}X)_{2}Se + 2 NaCl (X ∈ Si, Ge, Sn)
