= Caesium hydroxide =

Chemical compound

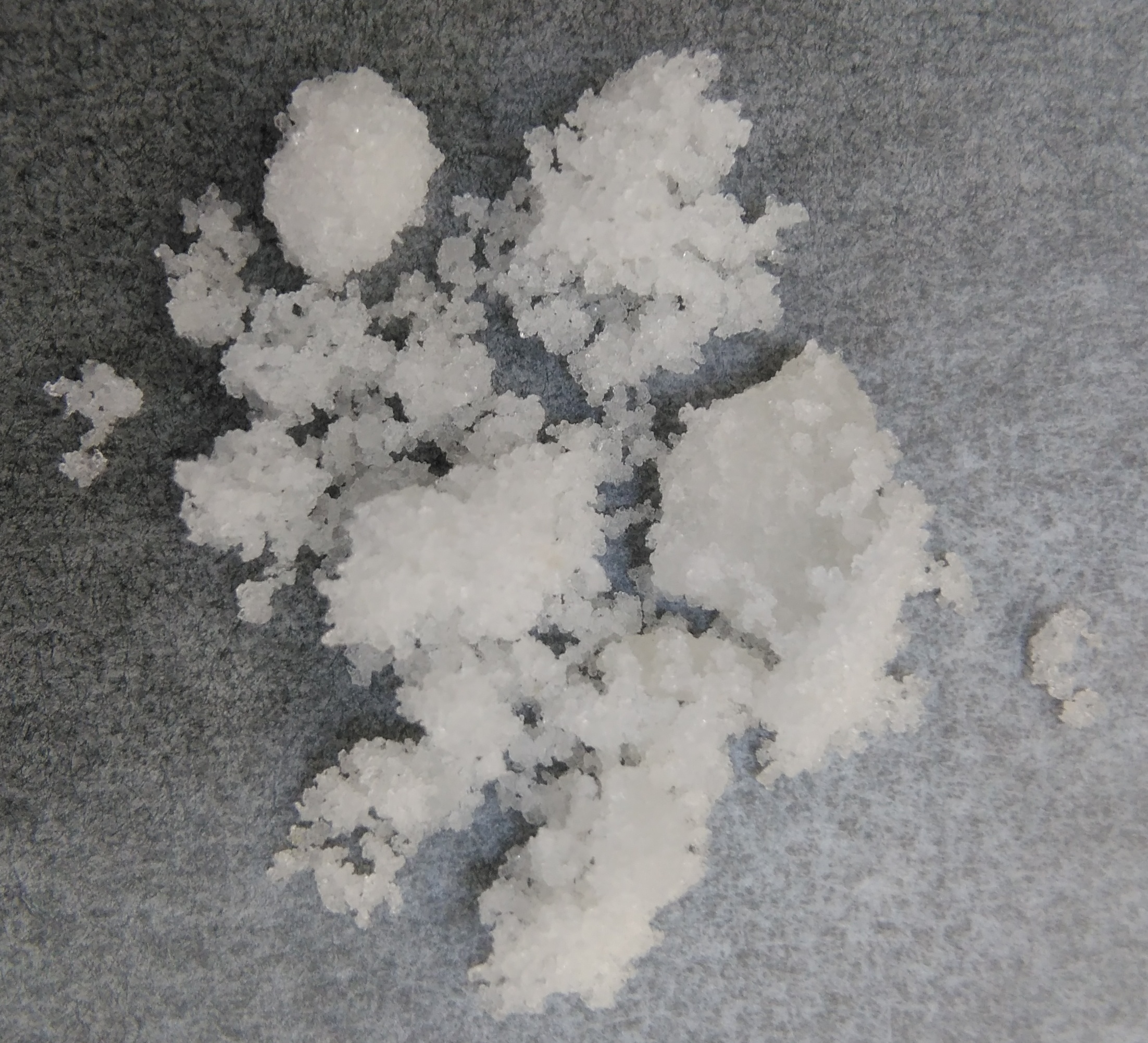

Names
- Other names Cesium hydrate

Identifiers
CAS Number	21351-79-1
3D model (JSmol)	Interactive image
ChEBI	CHEBI:33988
ChemSpider	56494
ECHA InfoCard	100.040.298
EC Number	244-344-1
PubChem CID	62750
RTECS number	FK9800000
UNII	458ZFZ6235
UN number	2682
CompTox Dashboard (EPA)	DTXSID7066699
- InChI: InChI=1S/Cs.H2O/h;1H2/q+1;/p-1 Key: HUCVOHYBFXVBRW-UHFFFAOYSA-M; InChI=1/Cs.H2O/h;1H2/q+1;/p-1 Key: HUCVOHYBFXVBRW-REWHXWOFAG
- SMILES: [OH-].[Cs+]

Properties
Chemical formula	CsOH
Molar mass	149.912 g/mol
Appearance	Whitish-yellow deliquescent crystals
Density	3.675 g/cm^{3}
Melting point	272 °C (522 °F; 545 K)
Solubility in water	300 g/100 mL at 30 °C
Solubility	Soluble in ethanol
Acidity (pK_{a})	15.76

Thermochemistry
Heat capacity (C)	69.9 J·mol^{−1}·K^{−1}
Std molar entropy (S^{⦵}_{298})	104.2 J·K^{−1}·mol^{−1}
Std enthalpy of formation (Δ_{f}H^{⦵}_{298})	−416.2 kJ·mol^{−1}

Hazards
- GHS labelling
Pictograms	(GHS05: Corrosive) (GHS07: Exclamation mark) (GHS08: Health hazard)
Signal word	Danger
Hazard statements	H302, H314, H361, H373
Precautionary statements	P201, P202, P260, P264, P270, P280, P281, P301+P312, P301+P330+P331, P303+P361+P353, P304+P340, P305+P351+P338, P308+P313, P310, P314, P321, P330, P363, P405, P501
NFPA 704 (fire diamond)	3 0 1 ALK
Flash point	Not flammable
- Lethal dose or concentration (LD, LC)
LD_{50} (median dose)	570 mg/kg (oral, rat)
- NIOSH (US health exposure limits)
PEL (Permissible)	none
REL (Recommended)	TWA 2 mg/m^{3}
IDLH (Immediate danger)	N.D.
Safety data sheet (SDS)	ICSC 1592

Related compounds
Other anions	Caesium oxide Caesium fluoride
Other cations	Lithium hydroxide Sodium hydroxide Potassium hydroxide Rubidium hydroxide
- Except where otherwise noted, data are given for materials in their standard state (at 25 °C [77 °F], 100 kPa). verify (what is ?) Infobox references

Caesium hydroxide is a strong base (pK_{a}= 15.76) containing the highly reactive alkali metal caesium, much like the other alkali metal hydroxides such as sodium hydroxide and potassium hydroxide. It is the strongest of the five alkali metal hydroxides. Fused caesium hydroxide has applications in bringing glass samples into a solution for analytical purposes in the commercial glass industry and a defense waste processing facility as it is able to dissolve glass by attacking its silica framework. The melting process is carried out in a nickel or zirconium crucible. Caesium hydroxide fusion at 750°C produces complete dissolution of glass pellets.

Due to its high reactivity, caesium hydroxide is extremely hygroscopic and deliquescent. Laboratory caesium hydroxide is typically a hydrate.

It is an anisotropic etchant of silicon, exposing octahedral planes. This technique can form pyramids and regularly shaped etch pits for uses such as Microelectromechanical systems. It is known to have a higher selectivity to etch highly p-doped silicon than the more commonly used potassium hydroxide.

This compound is not commonly used in experiments due to the high extraction cost of caesium and its reactive behavior. It acts in similar fashion to the compounds rubidium hydroxide and potassium hydroxide, although even more reactive.
