= Potassium oxide =

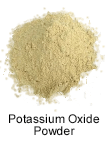
- Potassium Oxide spacefilling model

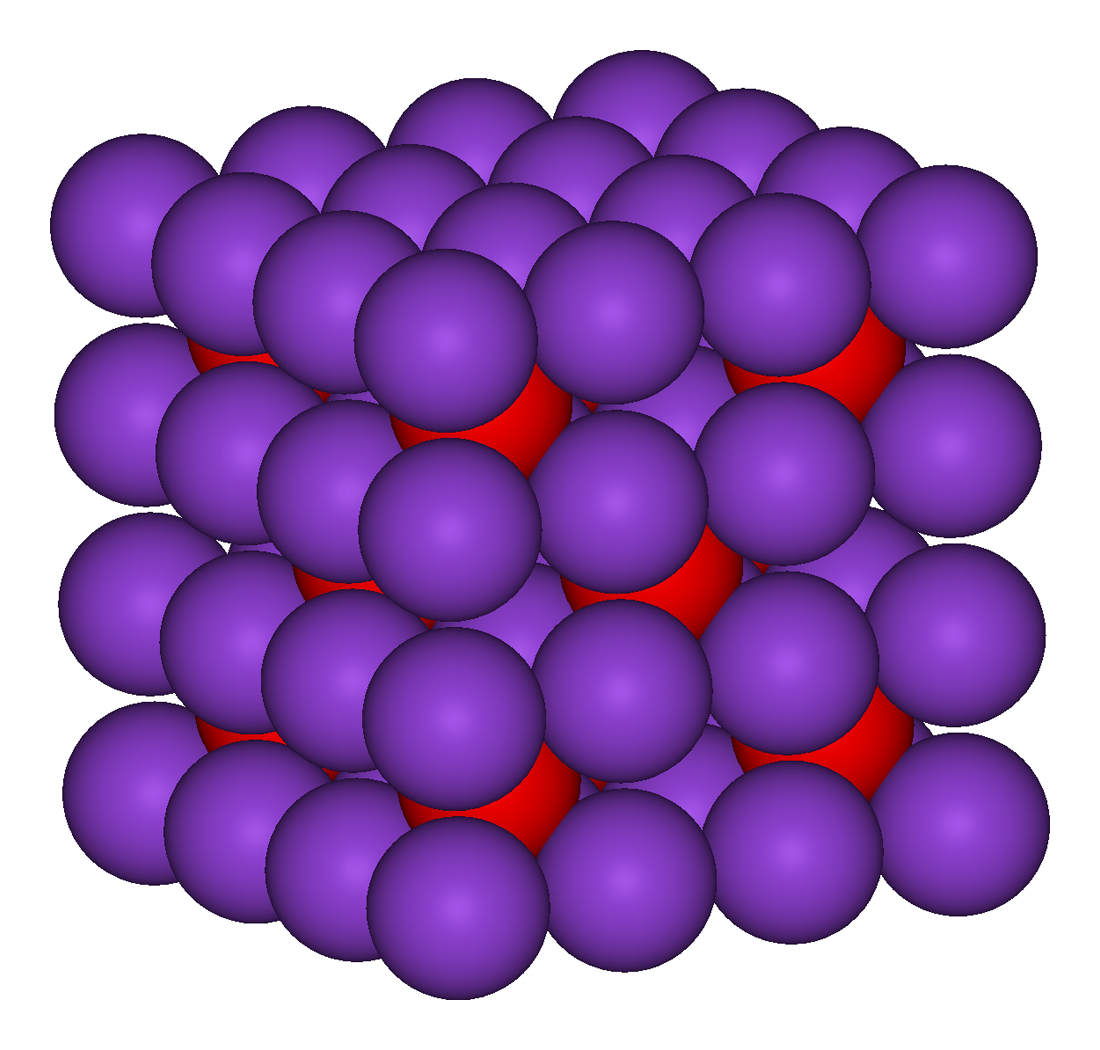

Names
- IUPAC name potassium oxide
- Systematic IUPAC name potassium oxidopotassium
- Other names potash, dipotassium oxide

Identifiers
CAS Number	12136-45-7
3D model (JSmol)	Interactive image
ChEBI	CHEBI:88321
ChemSpider	23354117
ECHA InfoCard	100.032.012
EC Number	235-227-6
MeSH	Potassium+oxide
PubChem CID	25520
UNII	58D606078H
UN number	2033
CompTox Dashboard (EPA)	DTXSID3049754
- InChI: InChI=1S/2K.O Key: NOTVAPJNGZMVSD-UHFFFAOYSA-N
- SMILES: O([K])[K]

Properties
Chemical formula	K_{2}O
Molar mass	94.196 g·mol^{−1}
Appearance	Pale yellow solid
Odor	Odorless
Density	2.32 g/cm^{3} (20 °C); 2.13 g/cm^{3} (24 °C)
Melting point	740 °C (1,360 °F; 1,010 K)
Solubility in water	Reacts forming KOH
Solubility	Soluble in diethyl ether

Structure
Crystal structure	Antifluorite cubic, cF12
Space group	Fm3̅m, No. 225
Lattice constant	a = 6.436 Å α = 90°, β = 90°, γ = 90°
Coordination geometry	Tetrahedral (K^{+}); Cubic (O^{2−})

Thermochemistry
Heat capacity (C)	83.62 J/mol·K
Std molar entropy (S^{⦵}_{298})	94.03 J/mol·K
Std enthalpy of formation (Δ_{f}H^{⦵}_{298})	−363.17 kJ/mol
Gibbs free energy (Δ_{f}G^{⦵})	−322.1 kJ/mol

Hazards
- Occupational safety and health (OHS/OSH)
Main hazards	Corrosive, reacts violently with water
- GHS labelling
Pictograms	(GHS05: Corrosive)
Signal word	Danger
Hazard statements	H314
Precautionary statements	P260, P264, P280, P301+P330+P331, P303+P361+P353, P304+P340, P305+P351+P338, P310, P321, P363, P405, P501
NFPA 704 (fire diamond)	3 0 1 W
Safety data sheet (SDS)	ICSC 0769

Related compounds
Other anions	Potassium sulfide Potassium selenide Potassium telluride Potassium polonide
Other cations	Lithium oxide Sodium oxide Rubidium oxide Caesium oxide
Related potassium oxides	Potassium peroxide Potassium superoxide Potassium ozonide
Related compounds	Potassium hydroxide
- Except where otherwise noted, data are given for materials in their standard state (at 25 °C [77 °F], 100 kPa). verify (what is ?) Infobox references

Potassium oxide (K_{2}O) is an ionic compound of potassium and oxygen. It is a base. This pale yellow solid is the simplest oxide of potassium. It is a highly reactive compound that is rarely encountered. Some industrial materials, such as fertilizers and cements, are assayed assuming the percent composition that would be equivalent to K_{2}O.

== Production ==
Potassium oxide is produced from the reaction of oxygen and potassium; this reaction affords potassium peroxide, K_{2}O_{2}. Treatment of the peroxide with potassium produces the oxide:

K_{2}O_{2} + 2 K → 2 K_{2}O

Alternatively and more conveniently, K_{2}O is synthesized by heating potassium nitrate with metallic potassium:

2 KNO_{3} + 10 K → 6 K_{2}O + N_{2} ↑

Other possibility is to heat potassium peroxide at 500 °C which decomposes at that temperature giving pure potassium oxide and oxygen.

2 K_{2}O_{2} → 2 K_{2}O + O_{2} ↑

Potassium hydroxide cannot be further dehydrated to the oxide but it can react with molten potassium to produce it, releasing hydrogen as a byproduct.

2 KOH + 2 K ⇌ 2 K_{2}O + H_{2} ↑

== Properties and reactions ==
K_{2}O crystallises in the antifluorite structure. In this motif the positions of the anions and cations are reversed relative to their positions in CaF_{2}, with potassium ions coordinated to 4 oxide ions and oxide ions coordinated to 8 potassium. K_{2}O is a basic oxide and reacts with water violently to produce the caustic potassium hydroxide. It is deliquescent and will absorb water from the atmosphere, initiating this vigorous reaction.

== Term use in industry ==
The chemical formula K_{2}O (or simply 'K') is used in several industrial contexts: the N-P-K numbers for fertilizers, in cement formulas, and in glassmaking formulas. Potassium oxide is often not used directly in these products, but the amount of potassium is reported in terms of the K_{2}O equivalent for whatever type of potash was used, such as potassium carbonate. For example, potassium oxide is about 83% potassium by weight, while potassium chloride is only 52%. Potassium chloride provides less potassium than an equal amount of potassium oxide. Thus, if a fertilizer is 30% potassium chloride by weight, its standard potassium rating, based on potassium oxide, would be only 18.8%.
