= Lithium telluride =

Identifiers
CAS Number	12136-59-3
3D model (JSmol)	Interactive image
ChemSpider	74833
ECHA InfoCard	100.032.014
EC Number	235-229-7
PubChem CID	82934
CompTox Dashboard (EPA)	DTXSID201311911
- InChI: InChI=1S/2Li.Te Key: GKWAQTFPHUTRMG-UHFFFAOYSA-N
- SMILES: [Li][Te][Li]

Properties
Chemical formula	Li_{2}Te
Molar mass	141.48 g·mol^{−1}
Appearance	Light grey or light yellow crystals
Melting point	1204.5°C

Structure
Crystal structure	Calcium fluoride structure (cubic)
Space group	Fm3̅m
Lattice constant	a = 0.6517 nm

Related compounds
Other anions	Lithium oxide Lithium sulfide Lithium selenide Lithium polonide
Other cations	Sodium telluride Potassium telluride Rubidium telluride Caesium telluride
- Except where otherwise noted, data are given for materials in their standard state (at 25 °C [77 °F], 100 kPa). Infobox references

Lithium telluride (Li_{2}Te) is an inorganic compound of lithium and tellurium. Along with LiTe_{3}, it is one of the two intermediate solid phases in the lithium-tellurium system. It can be prepared by directly reacting lithium and tellurium in a beryllium oxide crucible at 950°C.
