= Lithium sulfide =

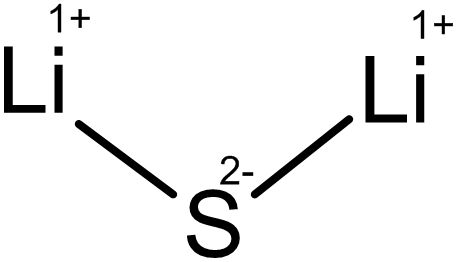

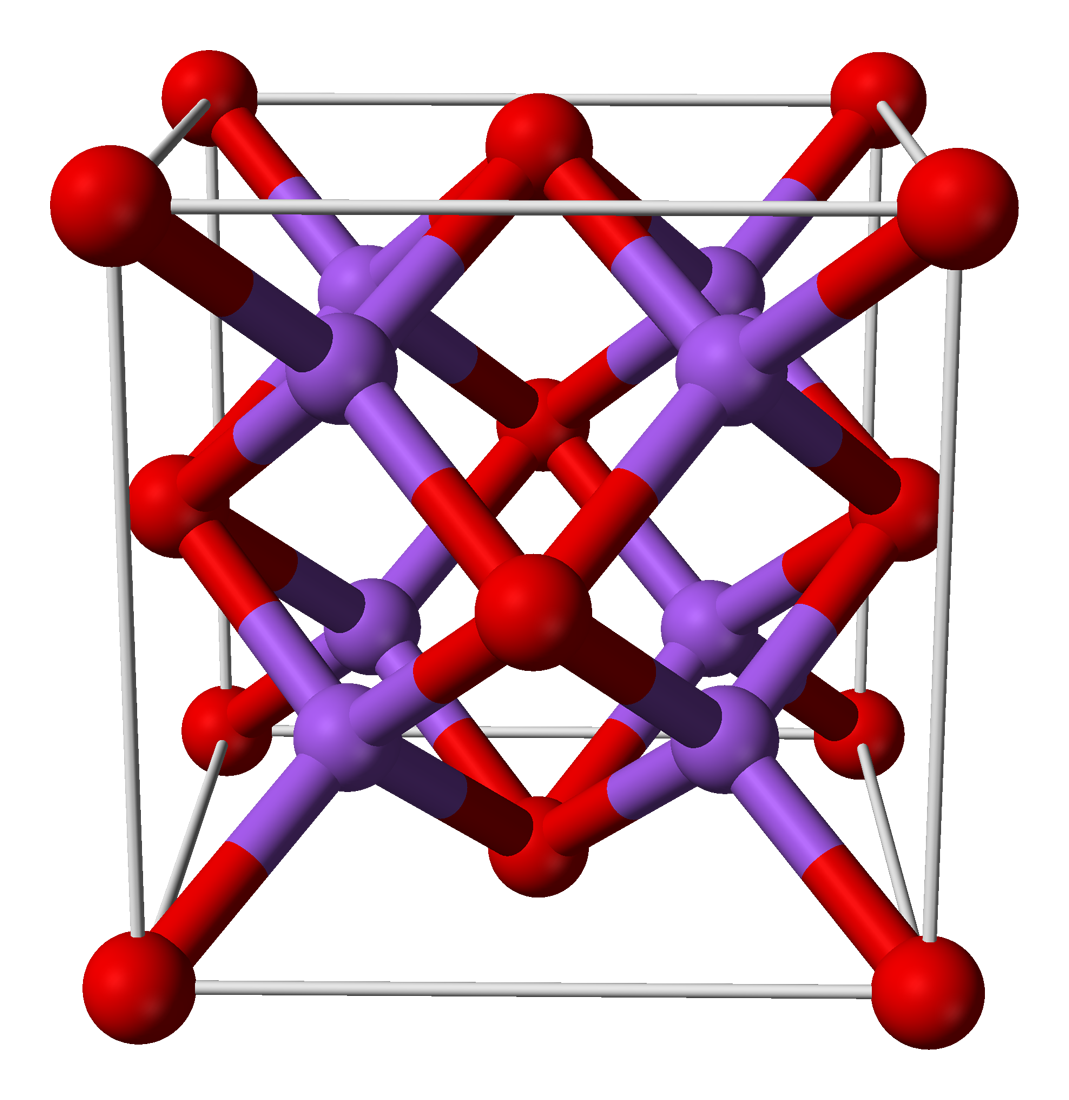

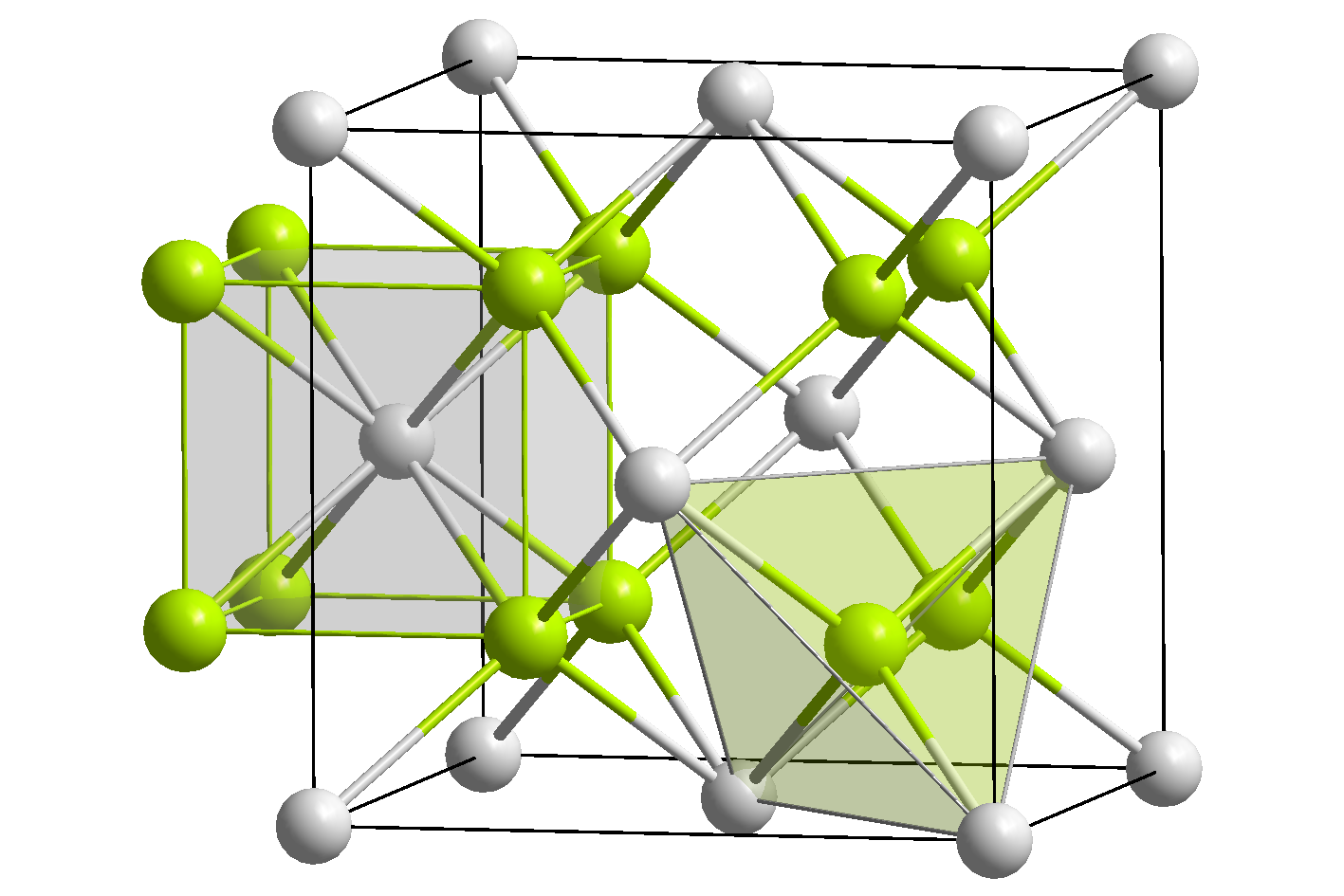
- __ Li^{+} __ S^{2−}

Names
- IUPAC name Lithium sulfide

Identifiers
CAS Number	12136-58-2
3D model (JSmol)	Interactive image; Interactive image
ChemSpider	8466196
ECHA InfoCard	100.032.013
EC Number	235-228-1
PubChem CID	10290727
RTECS number	OJ6439500
UNII	SW6C51V9JZ
CompTox Dashboard (EPA)	DTXSID7065251
- InChI: InChI=1S/2Li.S/q2*+1;-2 Key: GLNWILHOFOBOFD-UHFFFAOYSA-N; InChI=1S/2Li.S/q2*+1;-2; Key: GLNWILHOFOBOFD-UHFFFAOYSA-N
- SMILES: [Li+].[Li+].[S-2]; [Li+].[Li+].[S-2]

Properties
Chemical formula	Li_{2}S
Molar mass	45.95 g/mol
Appearance	white solid
Density	1.67 g/cm^{3}
Melting point	938 °C (1,720 °F; 1,211 K)
Boiling point	1,372 °C (2,502 °F; 1,645 K)
Solubility in water	decomposes to LiOH and H_{2}S
Solubility	very soluble in ethanol

Structure
Crystal structure	Antifluorite (cubic), cF12
Space group	Fm3̅m, No. 225
Coordination geometry	Tetrahedral (Li^{+}); cubic (S^{2−})

Thermochemistry
Std molar entropy (S^{⦵}_{298})	63 J/mol K
Std enthalpy of formation (Δ_{f}H^{⦵}_{298})	−9.401 kJ/g or −447 kJ/mol

Hazards
NFPA 704 (fire diamond)	3 1 1
- Lethal dose or concentration (LD, LC)
LD_{50} (median dose)	240 mg/kg (oral, rat)
Safety data sheet (SDS)	External MSDS

Related compounds
Other anions	Lithium oxide Lithium selenide Lithium telluride Lithium polonide
Other cations	Sodium sulfide Potassium sulfide Rubidium sulfide Caesium sulfide
Related compounds	Lithium hydrosulfide
- Except where otherwise noted, data are given for materials in their standard state (at 25 °C [77 °F], 100 kPa). verify (what is ?) Infobox references

Lithium sulfide is the inorganic compound with the formula Li_{2}S. It crystallizes in the antifluorite motif, described as the salt (Li^{+})_{2}S^{2−}. It forms a solid yellow-white deliquescent powder. In air, it easily hydrolyses to release foul smelling hydrogen sulfide gas.

== Preparation ==
Lithium sulfide is prepared by treating lithium with sulfur. This reaction is conveniently conducted in anhydrous ammonia.

2 Li + S → Li_{2}S

The THF-soluble triethylborane adduct of lithium sulfide can be generated using superhydride.

== Reactions and applications ==
Lithium sulfide has been considered for use in lithium–sulfur batteries.
