= Anti-structure =

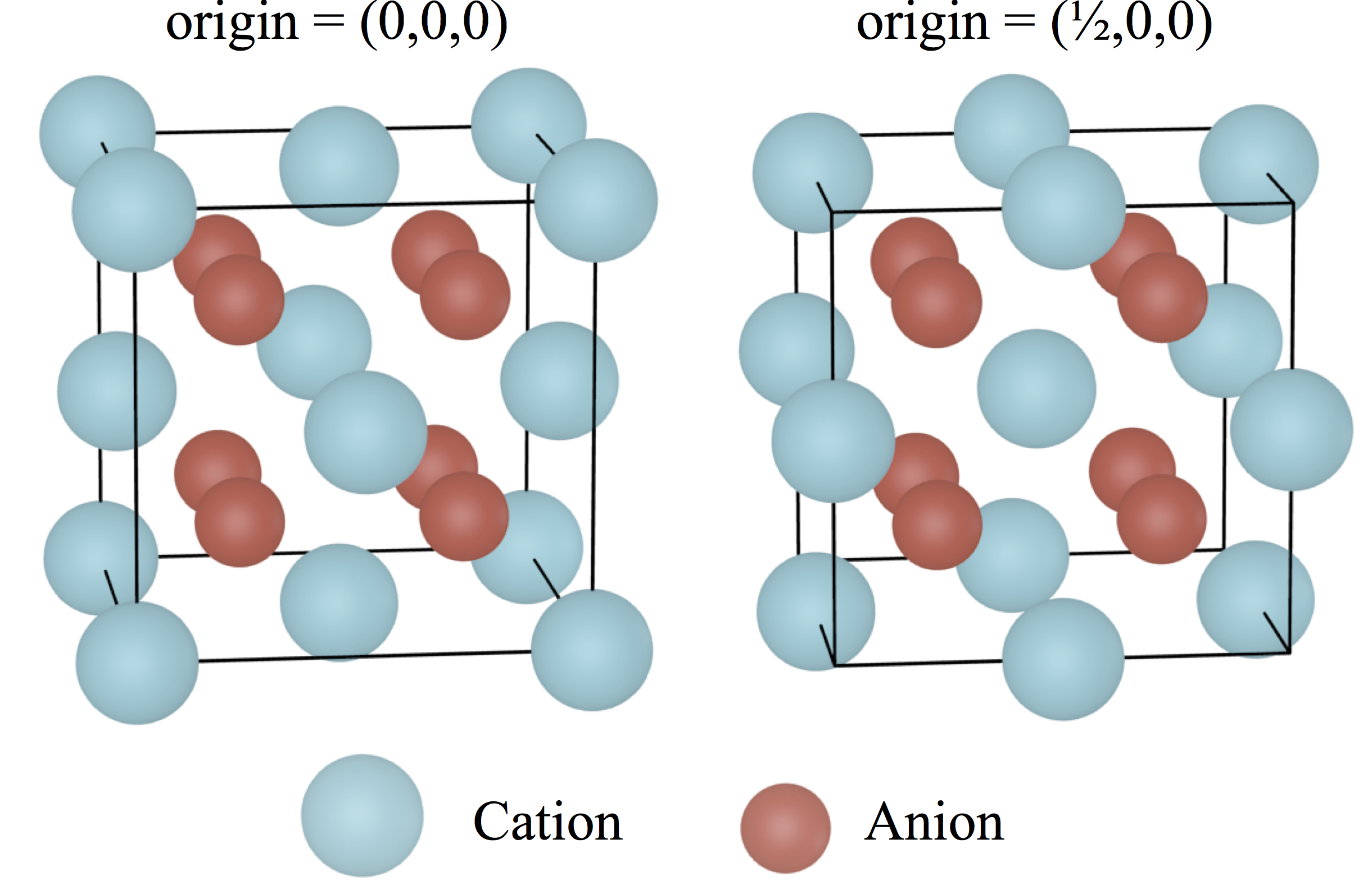
Unit cell of CaF_{2}, known as fluorite structure, from two equivalent perspectives. In the antifluorite structure (not shown in picture), the blue positions are taken by the anion, the red positions by the cation.

In crystallography, an anti-structure is obtained from a salt structure by exchanging anion and cation positions.

For instance, calcium fluoride, CaF_{2}, crystallizes in a cubic motif called the fluorite structure. The same crystal structure is found in numerous ionic compounds with formula AB_{2}, such as ceria (CeO_{2}), zirconia (cubic ZrO_{2}), uranium dioxide (UO_{2}). In the corresponding anti-structure, called the antifluorite structure, anions and cations are swapped, such as beryllium carbide (Be_{2}C) or lithium oxide (Li_{2}O), potassium sulfate (K_{2}SO_{4}).

Other anti-structures include:

- anti-SnO_{2}: Ti_{2}N
- anti-PbCl_{2}: Co_{2}P
- anti-CdCl_{2}: Co_{2}N
- anti-CdI_{2}: Cs_{2}O
- anti-NbS_{2}: Hf_{2}S
- anti-ReO_{3}: Cu_{3}N
- anti-LaF_{3}: Cu_{3}P, Cu_{3}As
