= Rubidium hydroxide =

Names
- IUPAC name Rubidium hydroxide

Identifiers
CAS Number	1310-82-3
3D model (JSmol)	Interactive image
ChEBI	CHEBI:32108
ChemSpider	56181
ECHA InfoCard	100.013.806
PubChem CID	62393
RTECS number	VL8750000
UNII	2692362HBM
CompTox Dashboard (EPA)	DTXSID1061655
- InChI: InChI=1S/H2O.Rb/h1H2;/q;+1/p-1 Key: CPRMKOQKXYSDML-UHFFFAOYSA-M; InChI=1/H2O.Rb/h1H2;/q;+1/p-1 Key: CPRMKOQKXYSDML-REWHXWOFAO
- SMILES: [Rb+].[OH-]

Properties
Chemical formula	RbOH
Molar mass	102.475 g·mol−1
Appearance	white solid, hygroscopic
Density	3.1 g/mL at 25 °C
Melting point	382 °C (720 °F; 655 K) dec
Boiling point	1,390 °C (2,530 °F; 1,660 K)
Solubility in water	173 g/100 mL (30 °C)
Solubility	soluble in ethanol
Acidity (pK_{a})	15.4

Thermochemistry
Std enthalpy of formation (Δ_{f}H^{⦵}_{298})	−413.8 kJ/mol

Hazards
- Occupational safety and health (OHS/OSH)
Main hazards	Corrosive
- GHS labelling
Pictograms	(GHS05: Corrosive) (GHS07: Exclamation mark)
Hazard statements	H302, H312, H314, H332
Precautionary statements	P260, P264, P270, P271, P280, P301+P317, P301+P330+P331, P302+P352, P302+P361+P354, P304+P340, P305+P354+P338, P316, P317, P321, P330, P362+P364, P363, P405, P501
NFPA 704 (fire diamond)	3 0 1 ALK
Flash point	Non-flammable

Related compounds
Other cations	Lithium hydroxide Sodium hydroxide Potassium hydroxide Cesium hydroxide
Related compounds	Rubidium oxide (+1)
- Except where otherwise noted, data are given for materials in their standard state (at 25 °C [77 °F], 100 kPa). verify (what is ?) Infobox references

Rubidium hydroxide is the inorganic compound with the formula RbOH. It consists of rubidium cations and an equal number of hydroxide anions. It is a colorless solid that is commercially available as aqueous solutions from a few suppliers. Like other strong bases, rubidium hydroxide is highly caustic. Rubidium hydroxide is formed when rubidium metal reacts with water.

== Uses ==
Rubidium hydroxide is rarely used in industrial processes because potassium hydroxide and sodium hydroxide can perform nearly all the same functions of rubidium hydroxide. Metal oxide catalysts are sometimes modified with rubidium hydroxide.
