= Caesium telluride =

Chemical compound, Cs2Te

Names
- IUPAC name Caesium telluridocaesium
- Other names: Cesium telluride; Dicaesium telluride

Identifiers
CAS Number	12191-06-9
3D model (JSmol)	Interactive image
ChemSpider	74859
ECHA InfoCard	100.032.137
EC Number	235-364-1
PubChem CID	82968
CompTox Dashboard (EPA)	DTXSID401312915
- InChI: InChI=1S/2Cs.Te Key: LZDVDTNBLCLMGQ-UHFFFAOYSA-N
- SMILES: [Cs][Te][Cs]

Properties
Chemical formula	Cs_{2}Te
Molar mass	393.4
Appearance	Crystalline solid
Boiling point	395.717128
- Except where otherwise noted, data are given for materials in their standard state (at 25 °C [77 °F], 100 kPa). Infobox references

Caesium telluride or Caesium telluridocaesium is an inorganic salt with a chemical formula Cs_{2}Te. Caesium telluride is used to make photo cathodes.

Caesium telluride is the photoemissive material used in many laser-driven radio frequency (RF) electron guns like in the TESLA Test Facility (TTF).
