= Fluorite structure =

Motif in solid state chemistry

The fluorite structure refers to a common motif for compounds with the formula MX_{2}. The X ions occupy the eight tetrahedral interstitial sites whereas M ions occupy the regular sites of a face-centered cubic (FCC) structure. Many compounds, notably the common mineral fluorite (CaF_{2}), adopt this structure.

Many compounds with formula M_{2}X have an antifluorite structure. In these the locations of the anions and cations are reversed relative to fluorite (an anti-structure); the anions occupy the FCC regular sites whereas the cations occupy the tetrahedral interstitial sites. For example, magnesium silicide, Mg_{2}Si, has a lattice parameter of 6.338 Å with magnesium cations occupying the tetrahedral interstitial sites, in which each silicide anion is surrounded by eight magnesium cations and each magnesium cation is surrounded by four silicide anions in a tetrahedral fashion.

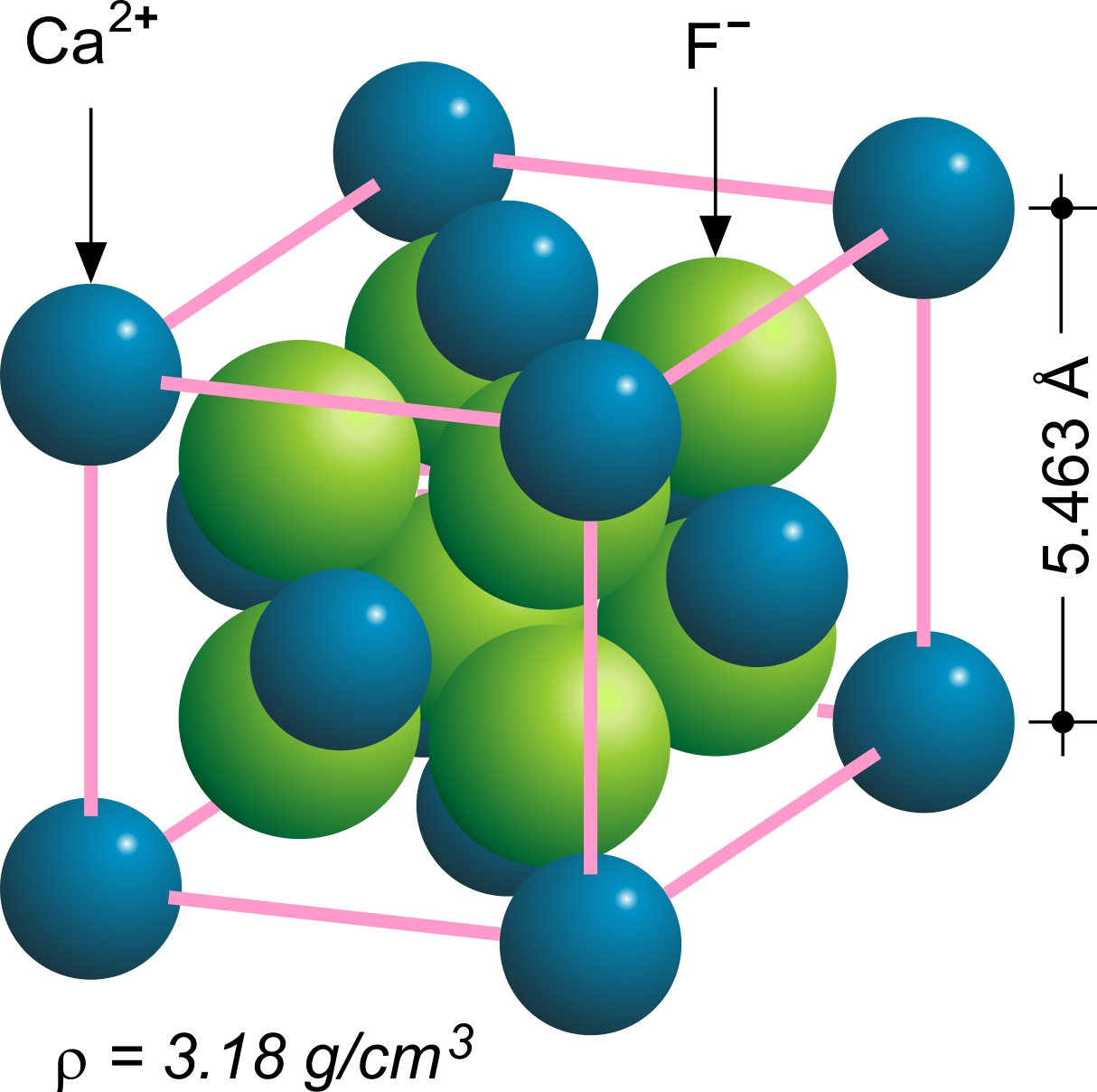
The fluorite structure of calcium fluoride CaF_{2}.

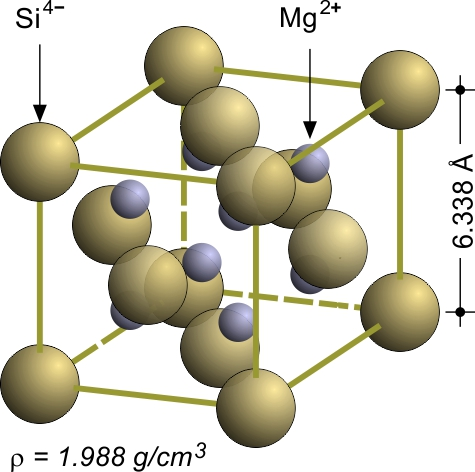
The antifluorite structure of magnesium silicide Mg_{2}Si.

Selected materials with fluorite and antifluorite structures at 300 K
Material	Lattice constant (Å)	Crystal structure
BaF_{2}	6.196	Fluorite (FCC)
β-PbF_{2}	5.94	Fluorite (FCC)
PuO_{2}	5.399	Fluorite (FCC)
SrF_{2}	5.7996	Fluorite (FCC)
UO_{2}	5.47065	Fluorite (FCC)
CaF_{2}	5.463	Fluorite (FCC)
ZrO_{2}	5.14	Fluorite (FCC)
LaOF	-	Fluorite (FCC)
K_{2}O	6.449	Antifluorite (FCC)
K_{2}S	7.406	Antifluorite (FCC)
Li_{2}O	4.61	Antifluorite (FCC)
Na_{2}O	5.55	Antifluorite (FCC)
Na_{2}S	6.54	Antifluorite (FCC)
Rb_{2}O	6.74	Antifluorite (FCC)
Mg_{2}Si	6.338	Antifluorite (FCC)

== Calcium fluoride example ==
Crystallography is a powerful tool to investigate the structures of crystalline materials. It is important to understand the crystal structure of materials to form structure-property relationships. These relationships can help predict the behavior of crystalline materials, as well as introduce the ability to tune their properties. Calcium fluoride is a classic example of a crystal with a fluorite structure. Crystallographic information can be collected via x-ray diffraction, providing information on the locations of electron density within a crystal structure. Using modern software such as Olex2, one can solve a crystal structure from crystallographic output files.

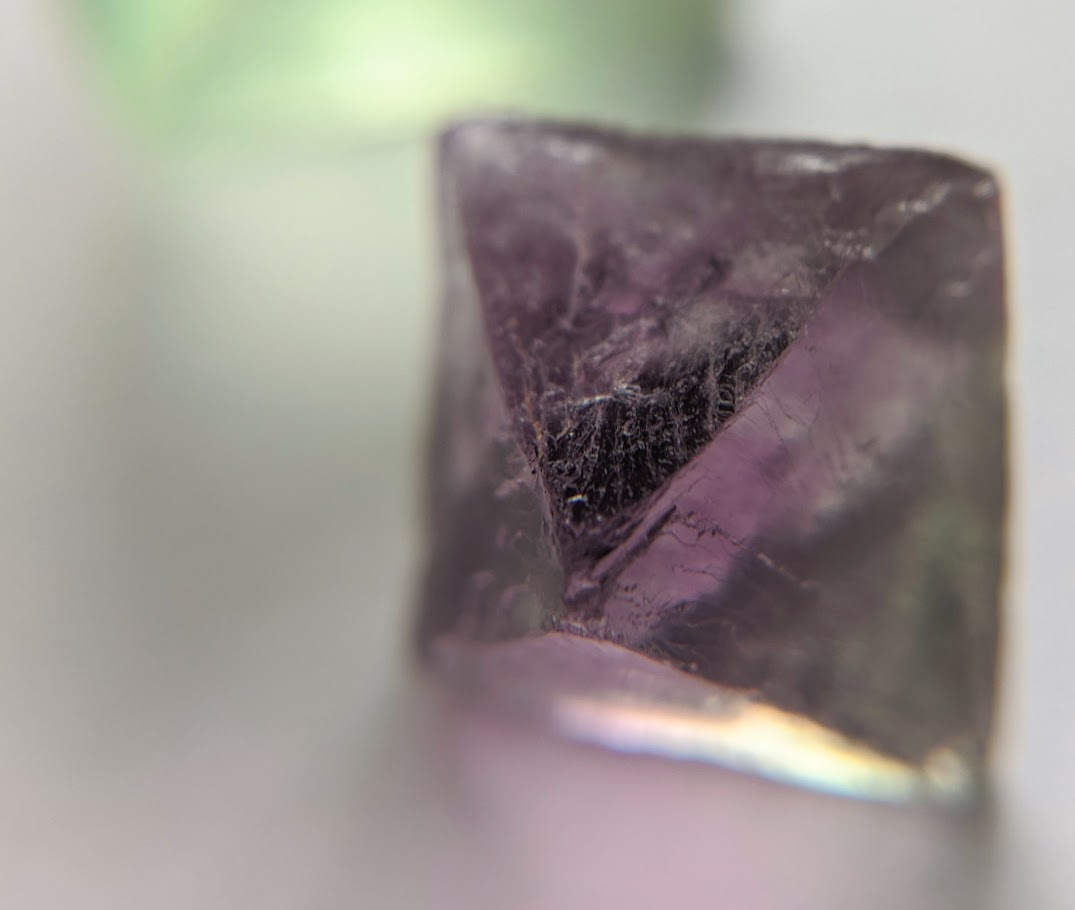
Extended crystal structure of calcium fluoride showing octahedral crystal.

=== Views of calcium fluoride crystal structure ===
In calcium fluoride, the calcium cations are surrounded by fluorine anions that occupy the tetrahedral sites, with an 8:4 coordination number, fluorine to calcium. This ratio is consistent with the stoichiometry of the compound, where the ratio of fluorine to calcium is 2:1. This relationship can be visualized as a cubic array of anions surrounding the calcium cations.

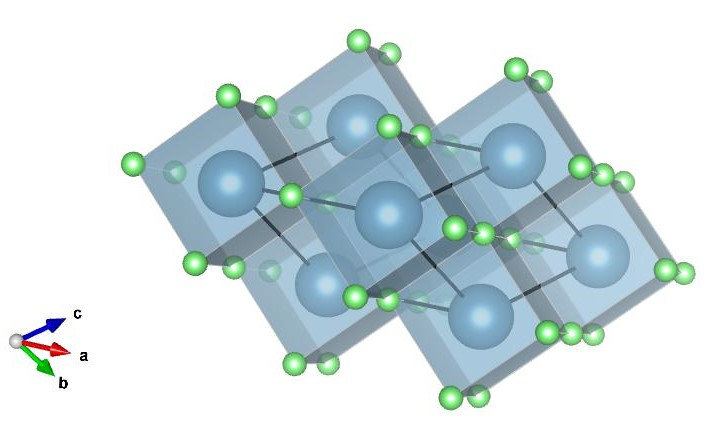
Cubic corner sharing visualization of calcium fluoride. Calcium in blue, fluorine in green.

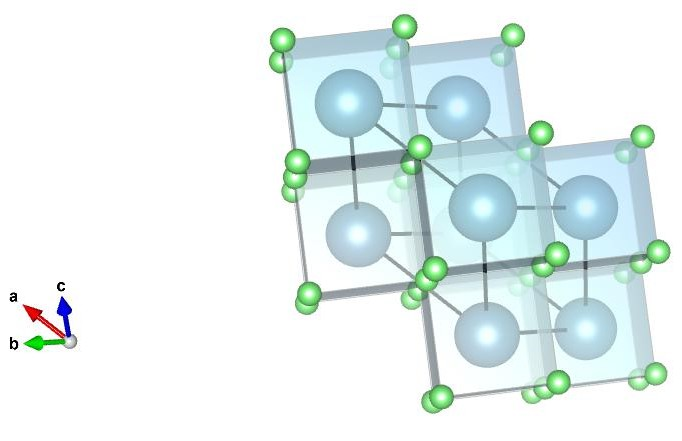
Cubic corner sharing visualized down a separate axis.

=== Extended fluorite structure ===
Beyond the until cell, the extended crystal structure of fluorite continues packing in a face-centered cubic (fcc) packing structure (also known as cubic close-packed or ccp). This pattern of spherical packing follows an ABC pattern, where each successive layer of spheres settles on top of the adjacent hole of the lattice. In contrast, hexagonal close-packed (hcp), are successively layered with an ABAB pattern. These two types of packing are the most closely packed forms of spherical packing.

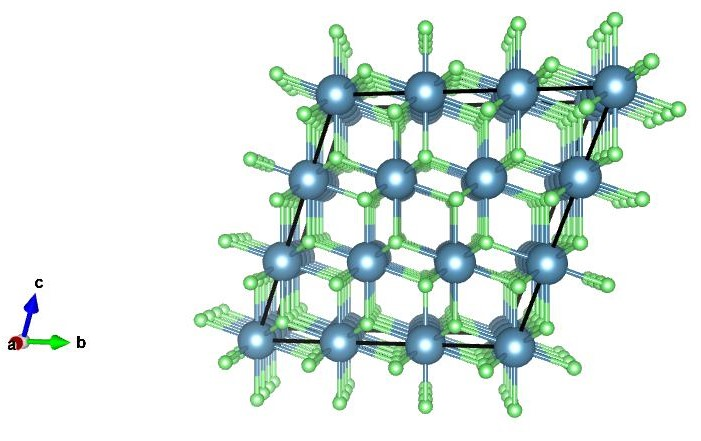
Extended crystal stacking structure of calcium fluoride; unit cell expanded by a unit of 3.

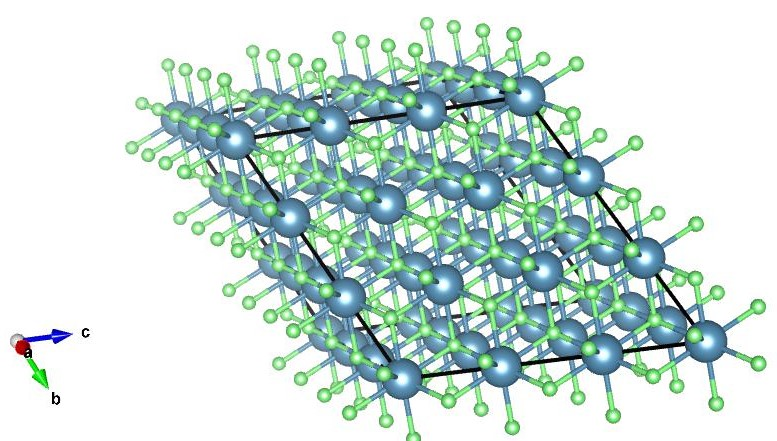
View of extended packing structure of calcium fluoride down a separate axis; expanded unit cell.

== See also ==
- Rock-salt structure
