= Lithium mining in Australia =

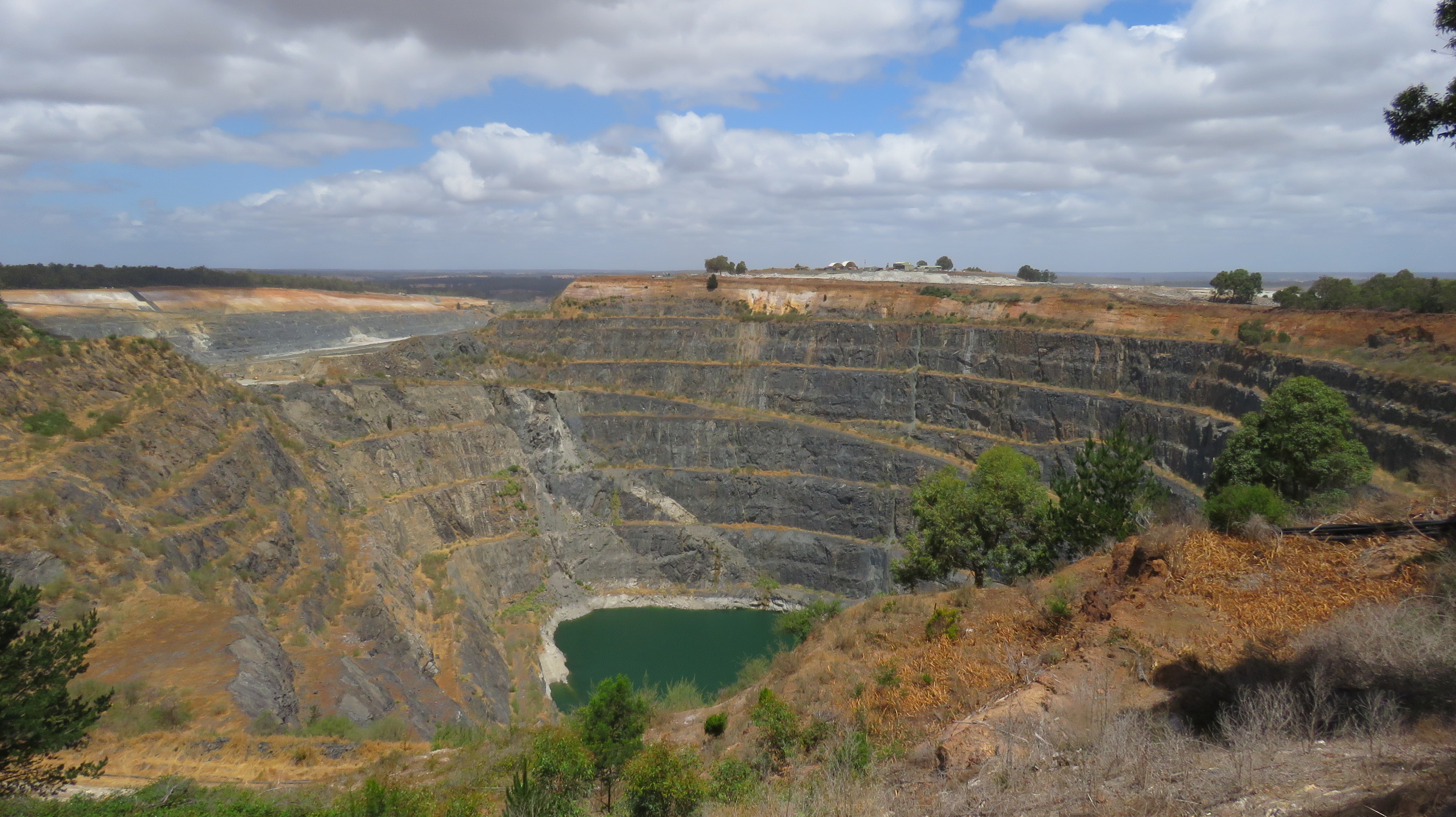
The Greenbushes mine in Western Australia is the largest hard-rock lithium mine in the world.

Australia has one of the biggest lithium reserves, and is the biggest producer of lithium by weight, with most of its production coming from mines in Western Australia. Most Australian lithium is produced from hard-rock spodumene, in contrast to other major producers like Argentina, Chile and China, which produce it mainly from salt lakes.

The world's largest hard-rock lithium mine, the Greenbushes mine, is in Western Australia. It is co-operated by the Chinese company Tianqi Lithium and the Australian companies Talison Lithium and IGO Limited. In 2021, it contributed 40% of the lithium mined in Australia.

Australia is home to lithium miners Orocobre, Core Lithium, Pilbara Minerals, Mineral Resources and Altura Mining.

A 2023 estimate suggests that lithium production in Australia will hit a cap of 1.2 million tonnes (2.6 billion pounds) of lithium carbonate equivalent by 2030, and that the country will by then remain the top producer but with a smaller proportion of the world's production compared with 2023.

== Major sites ==
=== Greenbushes mine ===
The Greenbushes mine in the southwest of Western Australia is Australia's oldest and biggest lithium mine. It was opened in 1984 by Greenbushes Tin, which had discovered major lithium deposits at the site four years previously while exploring for tantalum. The mine was purchased by Talison Minerals in 2007.

In the year to July 2022, Greenbushes produced 1.03 million tonnes (2.26 billion pounds) of spodumene concentrate.

=== Mount Marion ===
The Mount Marion mine is an open-pit mine in Western Australia near Kalgoorlie. It was originally developed by a joint venture between Mineral Resources and Neometals and became operational in 2017. Ganfeng Lithium purchased Neometals' stake in 2018. The mine is today co-owned equally by Mineral Resources and Ganfeng.

Mount Marion contains the world's second-biggest high-grade lithium mineral resources, with an estimated 71 million tonnes (160 billion pounds) of spodumene.

=== Pilgangoora ===
Pilbara Minerals produces out of its Pilgangoora lithium-tantalum project located in Western Australia's Pilbara region. The site is located 120 kilometres (75 mi) from Port Hedland. By 2018, the company had "attracted a group of high quality, experience global offtake partners including Gangfeng Lithium, General Lithium, Great Wall Motor Company and POSCO" as potential customers of its Pilgangoora project and was exploring options to scale the project.

The Pilgangoora mine was owned by Altura Mining until 2021, when the company went bankrupt. Its assets were purchased by Pilbara Minerals for A$201 million (US$151 million).

Pilbara Minerals commenced construction of its Pilgangoora project in January 2017 which was completed in late July 2018, producing its first lithium concentrate one month later. Pilbara Minerals delivered 111,199 dry tonnes (250 million pounds) to date for 2019 financial year with forecasted production for its March quarter between 47,000 and 52,000 dry tonnes (100 and 110 million pounds). On 28 March 2019 Pilbara announced it will commence a partnering process to support its expansion of the Pilgangoora project.

=== Mount Cattlin ===
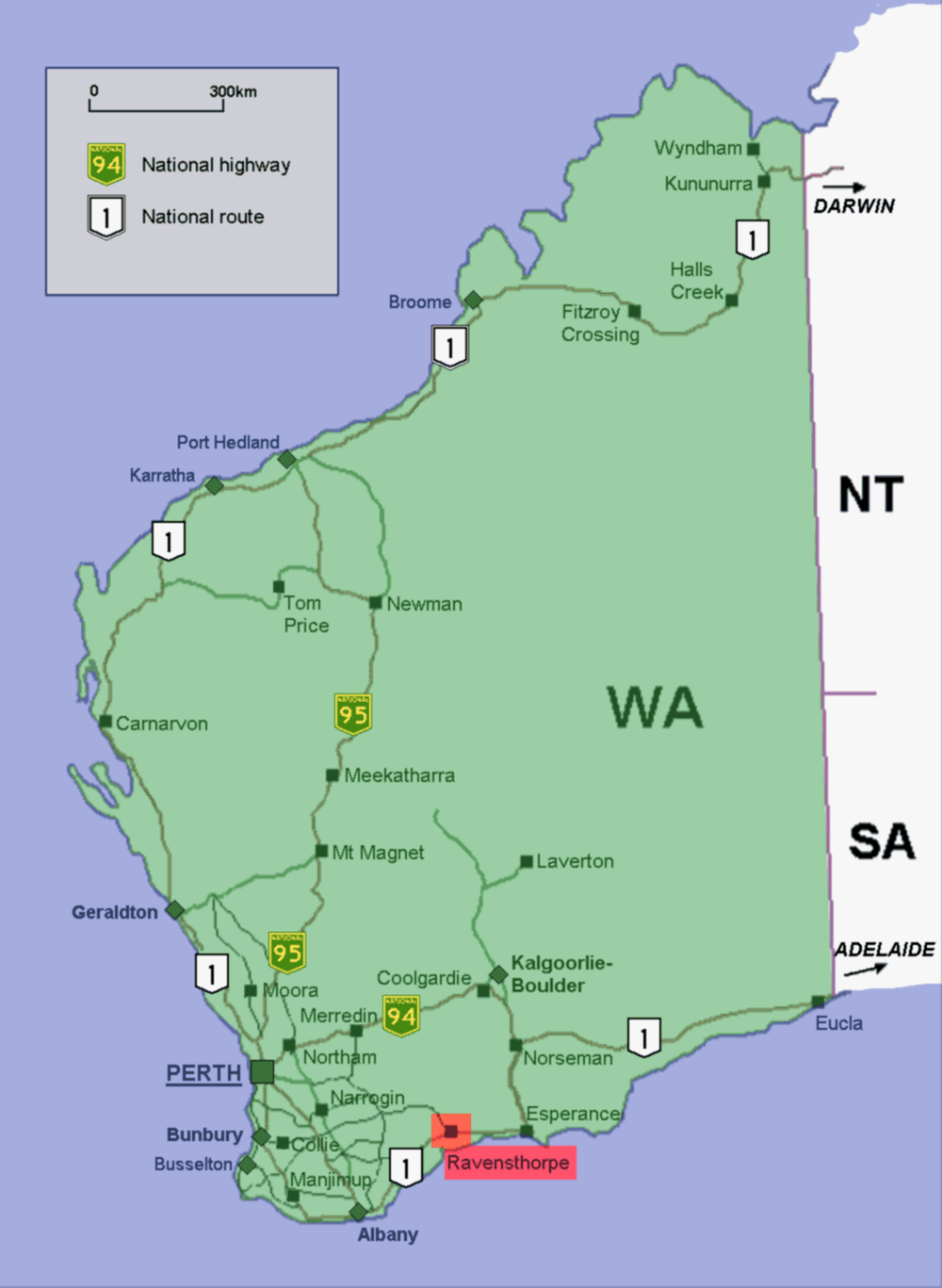
Ravensthorpe is located 541 kilometres (336 mi) east-southeast of Perth and 50 kilometres (31 mi) north-northwest of Hopetoun.

The Mt Cattlin mine is an open-pit mine near Ravensthorpe, Western Australia. It was developed by Galaxy Resources (now Allkem) and opened in 2010. The site contains an estimated 8.2 million tonnes (18 billion pounds) of lithium reserves with a lithium oxide equivalent content of 1.23%. In 2019, the mine produced 192,000 dry tonnes (420 million pounds) of spodumene. Mining was temporarily suspended there in 2013 due to a drop in lithium prices, but was restarted in 2016.

Processed ore is shipped out via the port of Esperance around 200 kilometres (120 mi) east of the mine.

=== Wodgina ===
The Wodgina lithium mine in Western Australia is operated by a joint venture between Albemarle and Mineral Resources. It has a theoretical annual production capacity of 750,000 tonnes (1.7 billion pounds). The site was inactive from 2019–2021, as low lithium prices made its operation unprofitable.

Historically, Wodgina was primarily an iron mine. Iron extraction there ceased in 2017.

=== Finniss Mine ===
The Finniss Lithium Project in the Northern Territory is the only Australian lithium mine outside of Western Australia. It opened in 2022 and is operated by Core Lithium. The project will unfold in stages, initially with open-pit mining near Grants and Hang Gong, as well as underground mining at the Grants, BP33, and Carlton prospects. The mine is estimated to contain 31 million tonnes (68 billion pounds) of lithium-containing minerals, with a lithium oxide-equivalent content of 1.3%. During construction, the project was given 'major project status' by the Australian government, which meant it was eligible for a streamlined federal approval process and help in dealing with local and state approval processes. Battery-grade lithium hydroxide was produced as part of the test works on spodumene mineral concentrate samples from the project in April 2021. Tesla contracted for 110,000 tonnes (240 million pounds) of spodumene concentrate over four years from the Finniss lithium mine.

=== Mount Holland ===
The Mount Holland mine is an open-pit mine situated 105 kilometres (65 mi) southeast of Southern Cross. Developed by Covalent Lithium (a joint venture between the Chilean company Sociedad Química y Minera and the Australian company Wesfarmers), with operations commencing in late 2023. The project plans to produce 380,000 tonnes (840 million pounds) of spodumene concentrate to a refinery in Kwinana. The refinery is planned to produce 50,000 tonnes (110 million pounds) of lithium hydroxide a year with a sodium sulfate by-product. In September 2025 the expansion of the Mount Holland mine was put on hold in view of low lithium prices.

Similar to Wodgina, the location was previously used for gold mining as the Bounty gold mine from 1989 to 2001, with much of the infrastructure removed prior to construction.

=== Other ===
Many Australian lithium producers also operate outside of Australia. For instance, Allkem, in addition to operating the Mt Cattlin mine, sources much of its lithium from various Argentinian sites and James Bay, Canada.

=== Lithium mines and deposits in Australia ===
Lithium mines and deposits in Australia
Name	Alternate names	State	Coordinates	Status	Commodities	Geological province	Geological age	Deposit model
Mount Marion		Western Australia	31.0738°S 121.4611°E	Operating	Lithium, lithium oxide	Yilgarn craton, Kalgoorlie Terrane		
Wodgina	Mt Cassiterite, Mt Francisco, Strelley	Western Australia	21.1746°S 118.6764°E	Operating	Lithium oxide, tantalum pentoxide, tin oxide/cassiterite, niobium, gemstones, tantalum, lithium, tin	Pilbara Craton	Archean	Environment: magmatic, group: pegmatite, type: LCT pegmatite
Pilgangoora (Altura)	Pilgangoora (Altura Mining)	Western Australia	20.9924°S 118.9197°E	Operating	Lithium oxide, lithium, tin, tantalum	Pilbara Craton	Archean	Environment: magmatic, group: pegmatite, type: LCT pegmatite
Greenbushes		Western Australia	33.8558°S 116.0668°E	Operating	Niobium, kaolin, tantalum pentoxide, lithium oxide, niobium pentoxide, (tin, lithium, tantalum)	Yilgarn craton, Southwest Terrane, Western Gneiss Terrane	Archean	Environment: magmatic, group: pegmatite, type: LCT pegmatite
Mount Cattlin		Western Australia	33.5624°S 120.038°E	Operating	Tantalum pentoxide, lithium, niobium pentoxide, niobium, tantalum, lithium oxide	Yilgarn craton		
Ravensthorpe		Western Australia	33.6074°S 120.3626°E	Mineral deposit	Lithium, lithium oxide			
Pilgangoora (Pilbara Minerals)	Pilgangoora (Pilbara Minerals)	Western Australia	21.0723°S 118.8953°E	Operating	Lithium, tantalum, tantalum pentoxide, lithium oxide		Archean	
Mount Holland	Earl Grey; Bounty	Western Australia	32.088°S 119.749°E	Operating	Iron oxide, lithium, lithium oxide			
Finniss Lithium Project		Northern Territory	12.6667°S 130.7775°E	Operating	Lithium, lithium oxide			

== Statistics ==
Australian lithium exports in lithium carbonate equivalents by weight and value (in Australian dollars) for the financial years 2013–2014 through 2021–2022

In financial year 2021-2022, Australia produced 330,000 tonnes (730 million pounds) of lithium carbonate equivalent. For comparison, Chile, the world's second biggest lithium producer, produced 45,000 tonnes (99 million pounds) in 2018. China, the third-biggest, produced 38,000 tonnes (84 million pounds). As of 2023, 53% of the world's annual lithium supply is mined in Australia, and 96% of it is exported to China for processing.

Worldwide production increased by 74 percent from 2016 to 2017, predominantly due to a "threefold increase in Australia's spodumene production". In 2017 Australia overtook Chile as the largest producer of lithium.

According to the United States Geological Survey,

five spodumene operations in Australia and two brine operations each in Argentina and Chile accounted for the majority of world lithium production [...]. The leading spodumene operation in Australia increased its spodumene concentrate production by about 40 percent in 2018 and remained the world's largest lithium producer [...].

== Environmental impact ==
Like all mines, lithium mines significantly impact their surrounding environments. Most lithium mines in Australia are surface mines. The most immediate impact of these mines is the removal of all plants, soil and wildlife on the site of the mine. The mining process generates inhalable and respirable dust particles.

Australian lithium extraction has a higher carbon footprint than lithium mining elsewhere. This is primarily because Australian lithium mines use extremely carbon-intensive power sources, especially diesel, for extraction and processing, and because most of it is subsequently shipped to China for further processing, which also uses highly carbon-intensive fuels.

== Investment in Australian lithium mining companies ==
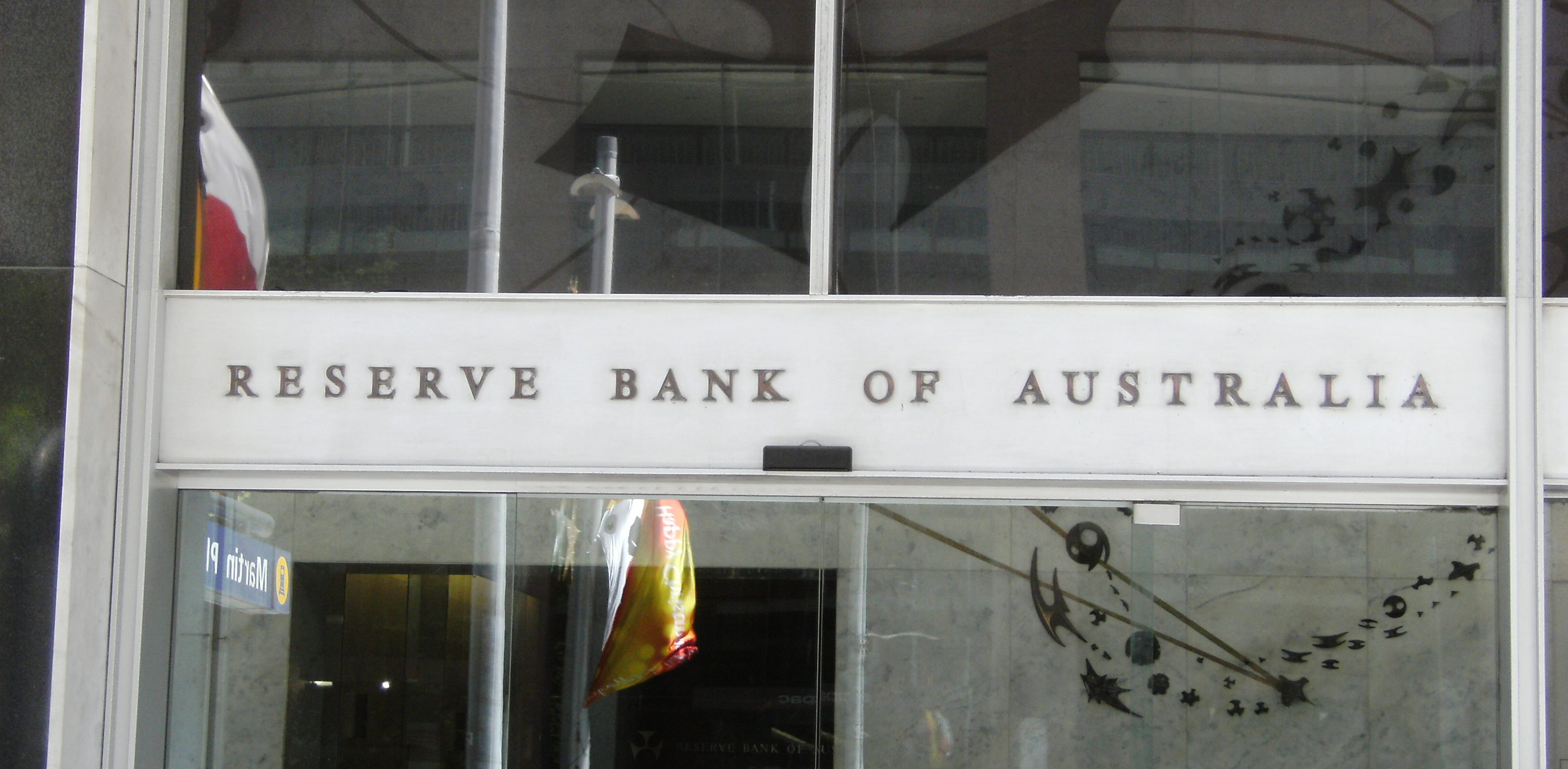
Reserve Bank of Australia Building, Sydney

Lithium may be extracted either by mining or from lithium brines. More capital outlay is needed for hard-rock spodumene mining than for lithium brines. This plays a role when identifying whether a project is worth an investment or conversely, if it should be abandoned.

Market demand is another major factor. The rapid growth and expansion of the electric vehicle sector has caused a surge in demand for lithium for lithium-ion batteries. This generates higher revenues for existing and new market entrants:

Pilbara Minerals managing director and chief executive Ken Brinsden said the demand for higher quality battery materials put WA in the drivers seat [...].

The rising demand in the market for lithium "shows no signs of slowing" in Australia, which hosts the "highest economic concentrations of lithium via several hard rock deposits". However, as reported by the Australian Financial Review, as supply of lithium grows, the value of existing companies falls. Supply continues to grow as a royal settlement struck by Chilean producer SQM gives the company permission over the next 7 years to more than triple its production, "but federal forecasts in the resources and energy quarterly found while WA will be pulling out a record 419,000 tonnes of lithium ore spodumene from the ground, it won't reap the same high prices the industry has experienced."

== Battery production ==
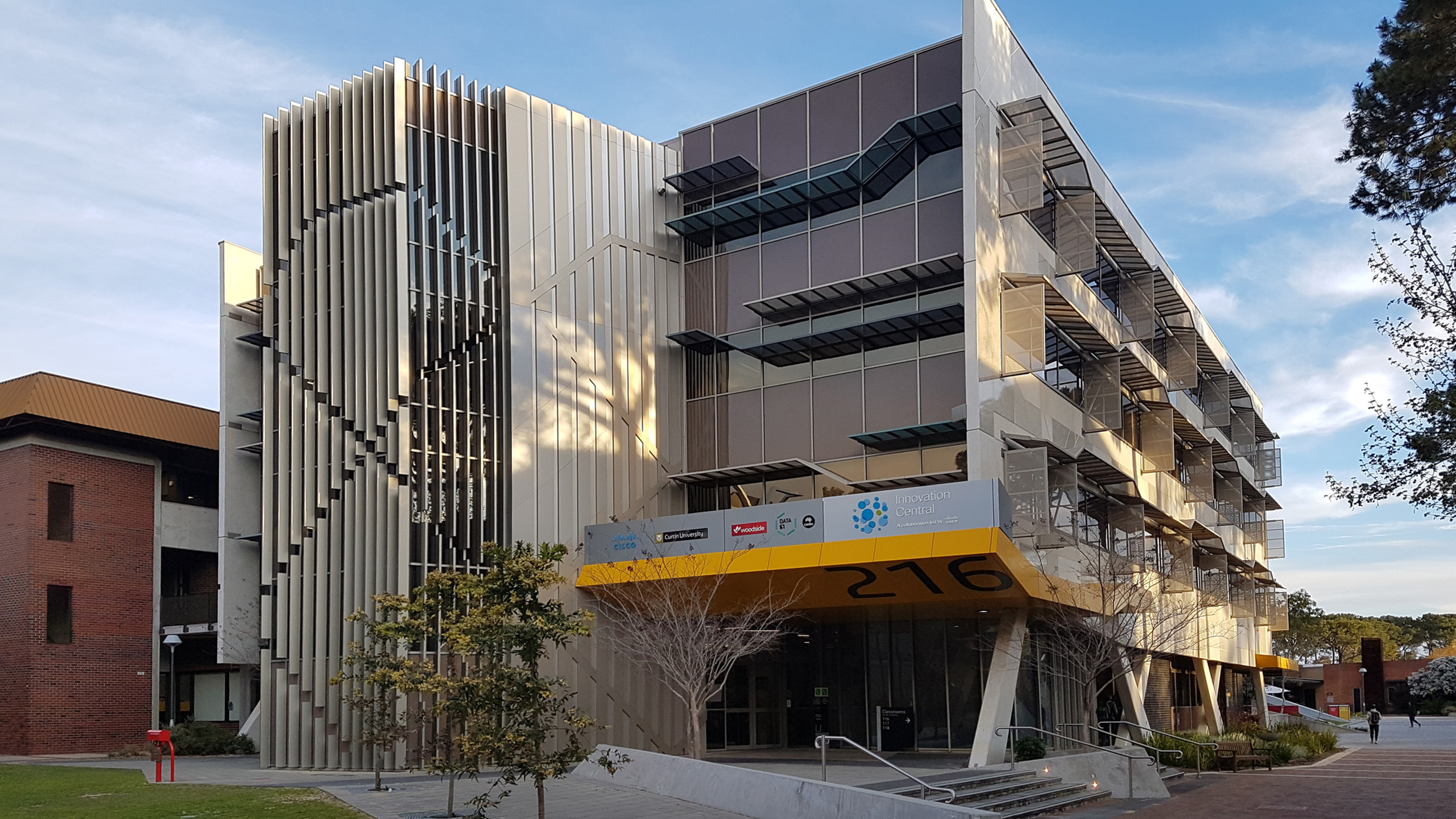
Building 216 on the Bentley campus of Curtin University

The Australian government has encouraged investment in the lithium industry. On 10 April 2019, the federal and state governments agreed to provide A$53 million in funding towards creating a modern national lithium research centre at Curtin University in Perth, with additional funding provided by industrial partners. The program and facility operated from the period of 2019 to 2025.
