= Finniss Lithium mine =

Lithium mine in the Northern Territory, Australia

- Location in Australia
- Location: Northern Territory, Australia; 12°42′47″S 130°47′20″E
- Products: Spodumene
- Production: 95,020 dmt Spodumene concentrate
- Financial year: 2024
- Opened: 2022
- Company: Core Lithium
- Website: Finniss Lithium Operation

The Finnis Lithium mine is a lithium mine situated near Darwin in the Northern Territory, Australia. It is being developed by Core Lithium.

The ore body was discovered in 2016, and feasibility work was done in 2018–2020 with a firm investment decision made in September 2021. Commercial production began in February 2023 with an 8-year lifespan.

== Geological setup ==
The mine comprises 500 km^{2} (190 sq mi) of leases, covering the Bynoe pegmatite field (BPF) and several pegmatites near Darwin. Specifically, it encompasses the five ore deposits "Grants, Carlton, Sandras, Hang Gong SW, and BP33." The:

ore bodies of the Finniss lithium project are characterised as lithium-cesium-tantalum (LCT) pegmatite deposits that are hosted within the Burrell Creek metasedimentary rock formation. The pegmatites at the deposits comprise lithium-bearing spodumene, quartz, albite, microcline as well as mica

with a consistent lithium content across the ore body.

== Description ==
Core Lithium is developing the mine, having completed a pre-feasibility study (PFS) in June 2018 and a definitive feasibility study (DFS) in April 2019. Revisions to the feasibility study were completed in 2020 to incorporate underground mining methods in the mining plan. A revised DFS was completed in July 2021 outlining a project that will occur in multiple stages. The first stage will involve open-pit mining near Grants and Hang Gong, as well as underground mining at the Grants, BP33, and Carlton prospects. The Australian JORC 2012 compliance process estimated 3.45 million tonnes (Mt) of mineral resource at 1.4 percent lithium oxide. Major Project Status (MPS) was granted by the Australian government in March 2021, recognizing the strategic significance of the project.

Battery-grade lithium hydroxide was produced as part of the test works on spodumene mineral concentrate sample from the mine in April 2021. Construction began in 2021 and full operational mining commenced in October 2022, with the first shipment of spodumene concentrate being exported from Port Darwin in May 2023.

Development of the mine is an $89 million project. Over the 12-year lifespan of the project 16 million tonnes (35 billion pounds) of ore are expected to be mined. Most lithium concentrate is expected to be exported overseas.

== Production and sales ==
In 2022, Tesla contracted for 110 thousand tonnes (240 million pounds) of spodumene concentrate over four years from the Core Lithium and its Finniss lithium mine.

== See also ==
- Lithium mining in Australia
