= Lithium batteries in China =

China produced more than 15 billion units of lithium-ion batteries in 2019, which accounts for 73% of the world's 316 gigawatt-hours capacity. China is a significant producer of lithium batteries and electric vehicles, supported by government policies. Lithium-ion batteries produced in China are primarily exported to Hong Kong, the United States, Germany, Korea, and Vietnam. The electric vehicle industry significantly drives the demand for lithium-ion batteries due to their high energy density relative to their weight. Global lithium production has tripled over the past decade. Noteworthy is the sizeable recent jump between 2016 and 2017 when global lithium production increased by over 75%, and by a further 23% from 2017 to 2018.

== Background ==
China is the leading producer of lithium-ion batteries. Chinese companies supply 80 percent of the world's battery cells and account for nearly 60 percent of the EV battery market. Even some US companies that produce batteries rely on lithium-ion cell components produced by Chinese manufacturers.

== History ==
In the 1990s, China had its first breakthrough with its state enterprise China Electronics Corporation successfully developing its own Model 18650 lithium battery which was ready for mass production. Although in this early stage, there was not much capital invested in the market, most of the research was dedicated to small consumer electronic products such as translators, music players, or cameras. With all of the varying consumer products, there are different needs for its battery, thus there is not a centralized demand for heavy research in the field. From 2001 to 2008, early players like BYD, Shenzhen Bike Battery, and Tianjin Lishen Battery have grown their investments in battery research and brought growth to the Chinese lithium battery industry.

However, there were moments of stagnation during this period with issues of scaling and meaning the demands from across the world. Also during this time, concepts such as electric vehicles have become more prominent but require more research. Since 2016, the Chinese government has set favorable policies for electric vehicle development. These policies include providing loans to manufacturers, different tax breaks received by the entire supply line, or invitations for foreign investments and consumption of their battery products. Currently, the lithium battery industry in China continues to grow under the accelerating trend for electric vehicles, applications in military equipment, 5G services, and more.

== Market ==
Before the 2000s, lithium-ion battery production was dominated by Japan with its superior technologies, by companies like Panasonic. Japan alone made 88% of the world's battery supply. In the following two decades, China invested heavily in its sourcing and manufacturing processes. Since 2015, China surpassed Japan, Korea, and the rest of the world and became the largest exporter of lithium batteries. Combined with Japan and Korea, the countries account for 95% of lithium battery production in the world.

China has the fourth-largest known lithium reserve with 1 million tons, behind Chile, Australia, and Argentina. Thus making them one of the biggest exports and capable candidates for developing lithium battery technologies. China continues to buy stakes in mining operations around the world. The world's largest lithium mine in Australia, Greenbushes, is controlled by China's Tianqi Lithium with its 51% stake.

In the decade since 2010, the market capitalization of China's lithium battery has had an average annual growth of 14%. Of China's more than 15 billion units of lithium batteries produced in 2019, China mainly exported to Hong Kong, United States, Germany, Korea, Vietnam, and others, where products and applications of the batteries are manufactured.

Top Chinese lithium battery exporting countries
	Destination	Exports (in dollars)
1	Hong Kong, China	2,207,253,444
2	United States	1,866,464,43
3	Germany	1,213,838,120
4	Korea	1,030,050,679
5	Vietnam	996,689,537
6	India	784,287,720
7	Japan	712,403,804
8	The Netherlands	455,132,698
9	Poland	287,811,484
10	Taiwan	269,490,560

Source: The General Administration of Customs of China

=== Production ===
China's crucial role in the development of lithium batteries can be highlighted by its lithium cell manufacturing capacity which accounts for 73% of the world's 316 gigawatt-hours capacity. Its competitive edge comes from the low labor and production costs which attract foreign companies that can only find more expensive quotes from their local suppliers. In 2019, there were 131.6GWH produced in China, and in the 2023, reached to 940GWH The battery production concerning the consumer demand is near saturation in China, however consumer demand for lithium batteries applications on vehicles is expected to have continual growth in the upcoming decades.

The market capitalization for lithium batteries in China is estimated at 190 billion yuan (approximately 30 billion dollars) and is projected to reach 268 billion yuan (42 billion dollars) by 2026.

=== Market segment ===
Lithium battery products are divided into many categories with the selection in electrolyte material, battery shape, anode/cathode material, covering material, and whether or not it is rechargeable. Recently, the use of man-made graphite has increased, replacing natural graphite ore. In 2020, man-made graphite accounted for 84% of the market share for anode and cathode materials. In the upstream of lithium battery production, there is material sourcing from lithium, cobalt, manganese, and nickel mines, along with graphite ore.

Upstream also includes processing these materials from the mines into electrolytes, cathodes, anodes, etc. Midstream involves the design of the battery and manufacturing the batteries from electrolytes, cathodes, anodes, and other pre-processed parts. Downstream is the application of lithium batteries, such as cellphones, laptops, and cars.

There are three main categories for products in the downstream - energy storage, consumer, and motor. The motor has the largest share with 53.95%, with consumers in second at 43.16%. The consumer segment is near saturation, while the motor segment is witnessing fast growth in global policies favoring electric vehicles. There are currently 72 Chinese companies in the race to produce lithium car batteries with Contemporary Amperex Technology leading with 50% of the market share.

== Electric vehicles in China ==
China is the world's largest consumer of electric vehicles, with 400,000 electric buses in 2019, it houses 99% of the world's electric buses. With Chinese policies favoring electric cars both for manufacturers and consumers, 1.3 million EVs were sold in China in 2020 alone, which represented 41% of global EV sales. China has the goal of pushing electric vehicles to become 40 percent of all car sales by 2030.

In 2020, 46.5% of lithium battery demand comes from electric vehicles, far exceeding the previous lead of smart mobile devices. As the largest consumer of EVs, China itself has a large demand for lithium batteries to produce these EVs. In April 2021, China has reported a total of 8.4 GWh of lithium batteries installed in their electric vehicles, this represents a 134% increase from the year before.

== Lithium battery related companies in China ==
=== Ganfeng ===
Ganfeng Lithium is the largest lithium supplier in China and the third-largest in the world. It is vertically integrated, including refining and processing, battery manufacturing, battery recycling, and others in its business resource development. It has patented inventions throughout battery production such as extraction technologies, recycling technologies from lithium wastes, and more. These technologies contribute to a high energy conversion efficiency and long-life energy storage. The company is also involved in the development of lithium extraction projects internationally, such as in Sonora Mexico, with the prospect to produce 35,000 tonnes of lithium per year.

=== Contemporary Amperex Technology ===
Contemporary Amperex Technology is one of the largest lithium battery producers in China and was responsible for 45.5% of battery installation in the country. In 2019, Contemporary Amperex Technology had a net income of 39.14 billion yuan, with 18% of China's lithium battery exports. During that year it had more than 32 GWh of lithium battery installation for electric vehicles, placing it first in the world ahead of Panasonic of Japan and LG of Korea. CATL provides lithium batteries for many companies around the world (including Tesla). Lithium iron phosphate batteries (LFP) tend to have a lower energy density compared to traditional lithium batteries (which also utilize cobalt) but have been sought after by the competitive price advantage without the expensive element.

=== China Aviation Lithium Battery Technology Co. ===
China Aviation Lithium Battery Technology Co. (CALB) was formed in 2015 as part of state-owned aerospace and defense firm Aviation Industry Corp of China Ltd. In 2022, it is going to become public in Hong Kong for $2 billion. As of July 2022, CALB has a market share in China of 11.2 percent. It is the second-largest maker of ternary nickel batteries.

=== BYD Company ===
As one of the early leaders in China's lithium battery industry, BYD Company along with other early players were responsible for the rapid development that transitioned China from a mimicker to a leading developer. It has since transitioned itself into the automaker industry. With a split focus, it was responsible for 14.6% of the lithium batteries installed in electric vehicles countrywide in the first quarter of 2021.

== Challenges and controversies ==
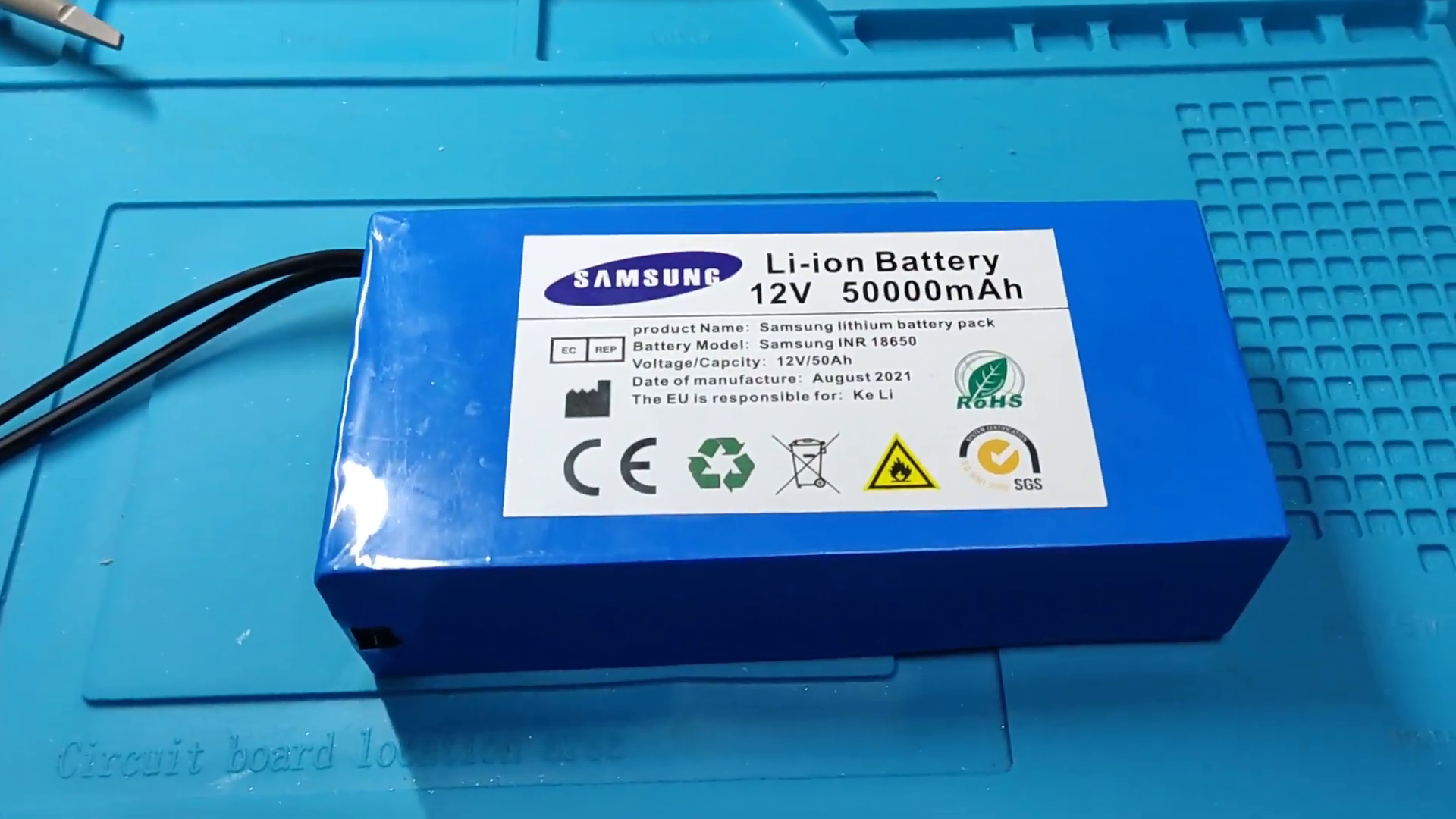
A Chinese counterfeit product of a Samsung Lithium-ion battery which was sold on AliExpress

The procedure to produce lithium batteries is long and complex, from mining to refining, cathode production, cell production, to module assembly, before passing on to original equipment manufacturers. Each of those steps encompasses many micro-steps that require precision and time to ensure its quality. For the procedure of formation or aging within module assembly, it could take up to 3 weeks for each batch which contributes to 30% of the manufacturing cost.

As most mining processes are invasive to the surrounding area, lithium mining has also met serious controversies about the impact it has on the surrounding area. The controversy of lithium mining comes from its need for water - mining one ton of lithium requires 500,000 US gallons (1,900,000 L; 420,000 imp gal) of water. Yet, the largest mines in the world reside in Argentina, Bolivia, and Chile, which often face droughts and have serious demand for fresh water from the local farmers. Thus the extraction of lithium has often been linked to increased droughts. In several of the lithium mines there are reports of chemical leaks in the nearby water source, these chemicals such as hydrochloric acid are toxic to living organisms. Other reports may attribute lithium mining to damage to the soil and air contamination. Thus, some activists have warned about the environmental impact of lithium mining.

== Environmental implications ==
As the world starts to act on the climate crisis, many countries have set targets to lower carbon emissions. Many countries are slowly moving to ban gasoline-powered vehicles on the road - Norway with targeted transition completed by 2025, and the U.S., Japan, and many other European countries set their timeline near 2035. During this transition, lithium would continue to have a trending relevance in the production of electric vehicles. In 2019 transportation accounts for 28% of energy consumption in the United States. This means a total shift from petroleum, biofuels, natural gas, or other fuels that currently power our cars could mean a 28% CO_{2} reduction. While we are searching for alternative energy sources from windmills, solar panels, hydropower, or nuclear fusions, lithium batteries play an important role as storage units for applications such as electric vehicles.

Lithium batteries and electric vehicles do not directly reduce carbon emissions, as the energy that is stored in car batteries can still come from many different sources, including fossil fuel burning. However, the advancement of lithium batteries has contributed to the development of electric vehicles which removed our dependence on gasoline to power our vehicles.

A bottleneck in the development of electric vehicles comes from the availability of charging stations. Although China has currently set up the most charging stations in the world, with more than 1.32 million stations, of which 550,000 of those are for public use, these numbers are still far from the needs of all-electric vehicle users if it wishes to scale.

== See also ==
- List of electric vehicle battery manufacturers
- Electric vehicle battery
