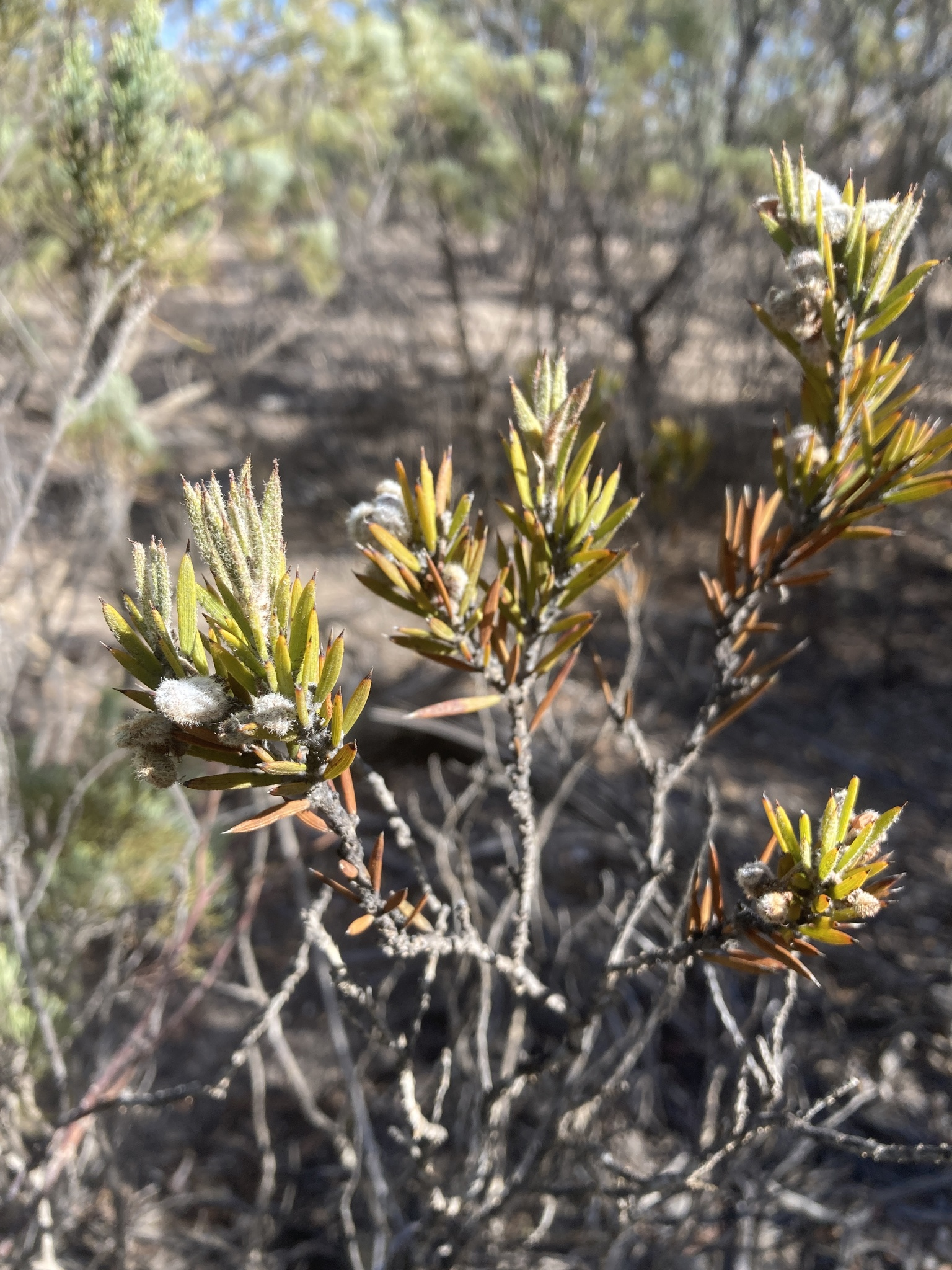

Conservation status
- Priority One — Poorly Known Taxa (DEC)

Scientific classification
- Kingdom: Plantae
- Clade: Embryophytes
- Clade: Tracheophytes
- Clade: Spermatophytes
- Clade: Angiosperms
- Clade: Eudicots
- Clade: Rosids
- Order: Fabales
- Family: Fabaceae
- Subfamily: Caesalpinioideae
- Clade: Mimosoid clade
- Genus: Acacia
- Species: A. lachnocarpa

Binomial name
- Acacia lachnocarpa R.W.Davis & Hislop

= Acacia lachnocarpa =

Woolly-fruited wattle

Species of legume

Acacia lachnocarpa, commonly known as woolly-fruited wattle, is a species of flowering plant in the family Fabaceae and is endemic to a small area in the inland of Western Australia. It is a dense, rounded shrub with rough branchlets, narrowly elliptic, flat, rigid phyllodes, spherical heads of yellow flowers and oblong, leathery to slightly crusty pods raised over the seeds and not constricted between them.

== Description ==
Acacia lachnocarpa is a dense, rounded shrub that typically grows to 70–100 cm (28–39 in) high and 70–90 cm (28–35 in) wide with terete branchlets densely covered with grey white hairs. Its phyllodes are flat, narrowly elliptic, 18–35 mm (0.71–1.38 in) long and 1.5–3.5 mm (0.059–0.138 in) wide, often asymmetric, rigid and sharply pointed, with six to nine longitudinal veins on each side. The pulvinus is 1.5–2.5 mm (0.059–0.098 in) long and there are tapering to narrowly triangular stipules 1.8–2.5 mm (0.071–0.098 in) long, 0.3–1.0 mm (0.012–0.039 in) wide at the base of the phyllode, and a prominent elliptic gland on the upper margin 8–12 mm (0.31–0.47 in) from the base of the pulvinus. The flowers are borne in a spherical head on a hairy peduncle 4–7 mm (0.16–0.28 in) long, the heads are 4.5–5.5 mm (0.18–0.22 in) in diameter with 23 to 30 yellow flowers. Flowering apparently occurs mostly in winter and early spring, and the pods are oblong, 11–15 mm (0.43–0.59 in) long and 6–8 mm (0.24–0.31 in) wide, leathery to slightly crusty, and hairy. The seeds are elliptic, about 3 mm (0.12 in) long,2 mm (0.079 in) wide and glossy black with a white aril about 3 mm (0.12 in) long on the end.

== Taxonomy ==
Acacia lachnocarpa was first formally described in 2020 by Robert Davis and Michael Hislop in the journal Nuytsia south of Southern Cross in 2018. The specific epithet (lachnocarpa) means 'soft wool-fruited'.

== Distribution and habitat ==
Woolly-fruited wattle grows in open woodlands in sandy clay mostly near Mount Holland in the Avon Wheatbelt and Coolgardie, about 100 km (62 mi) south of Southern Cross.

== Conservation status ==
Acacia lachnocarpa is listed as "Priority One" by the Western Australian Government Department of Biodiversity, Conservation and Attractions, meaning that it is known from only one or a few locations which are potentially at risk.

== See also ==
- List of Acacia species
