= Chinese sailless submarine =

Submarine

History

PRC
- Launched: 2018
- In service: 2019

General characteristics
- Length: 150 ft
- Beam: 15 ft

A sailless submarine was launched in 2018 at Jiangnan Shipyard, for the People's Liberation Army Navy (PLAN) of the People's Republic of China (PRC).

First launched in 2018 at Jiangnan Shipyard, this submarine is rather unique in that it lacks the conning tower commonly found on submarines, but instead, has a tiny bump where the conning tower is usually located, and hence called "Chinese sailless submarine" by western analysts and observers. It's speculated that this submarine is powered by lithium batteries, and used as a test bed for Chinese submarine technologies.

Specifications:

- Length (ft): 150
- Beam (ft): 15

Type	NATO designation	Pennant No.	Name (English)	Name (Han 汉)	Commissioned	Displacement	Fleet	Status
Unknown	Not yet assigned	Unknown	Unknown	Unknown	2019	? t	All fleet	Active
