= Sodium polonide =

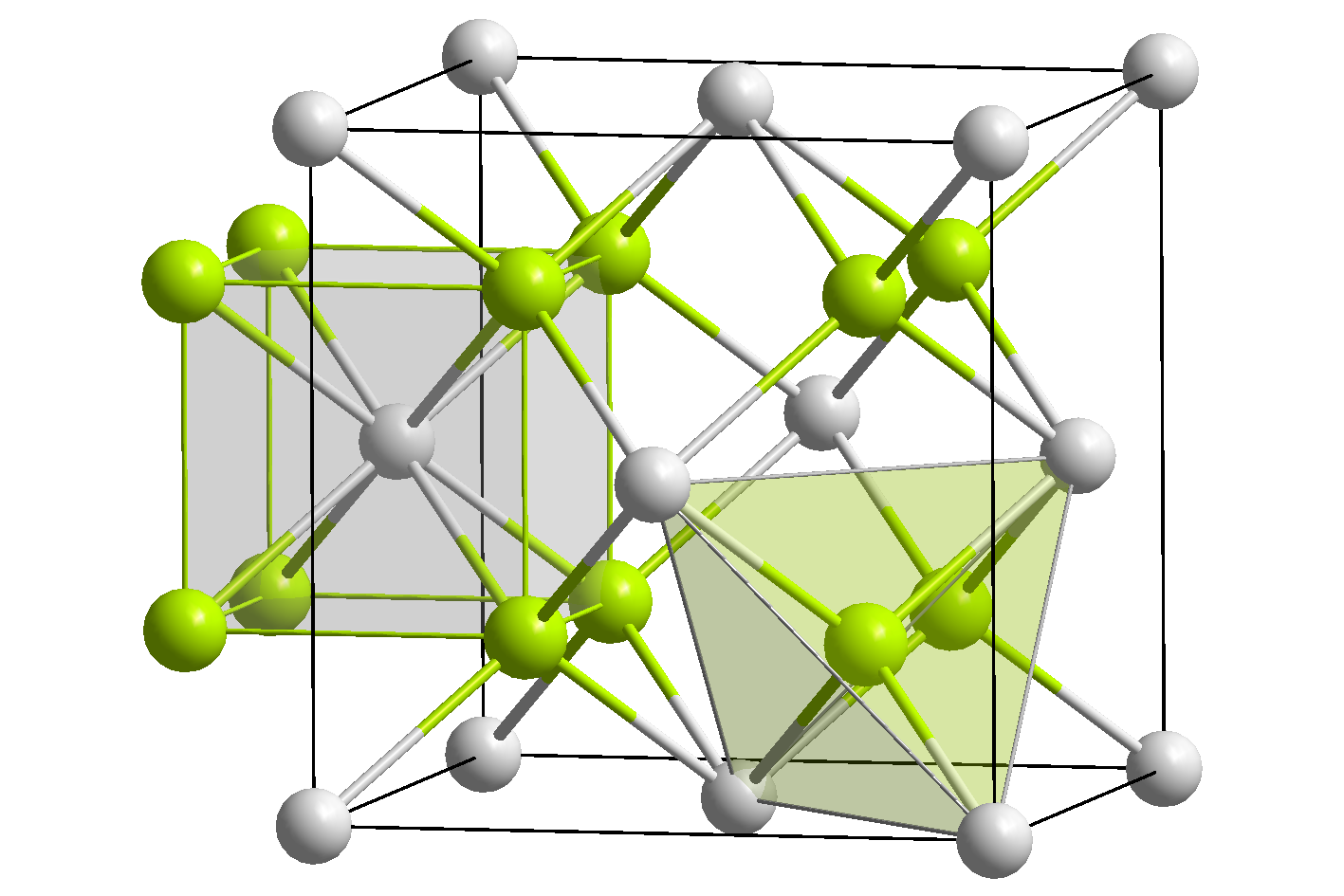
- Crystal structure of sodium polonide __ Na^{+} __ Po^{2−}

Names
- Preferred IUPAC name Sodium polonide

Identifiers
3D model (JSmol)	Interactive image
- InChI: InChI=1S/2Na.Po/q2*+1;-2
- SMILES: [Na+].[Na+].[Po-2]

Properties
Chemical formula	Na_{2}Po
Molar mass	254.96 g/mol
Appearance	greyish

Related compounds
Other anions	Sodium oxide; Sodium sulfide; Sodium selenide; Sodium telluride
Other cations	Polonium hydride; Lithium polonide; Potassium polonide
- Except where otherwise noted, data are given for materials in their standard state (at 25 °C [77 °F], 100 kPa). Infobox references

Sodium polonide is a radioactive chemical compound with the formula Na_{2}Po. This salt is a polonide, a set of very chemically stable compounds of polonium. Due to the difference in electronegativity (ΔEN) between sodium and polonium (≈ 1.1 under the Pauling system) and the slight non-metallic character of polonium, it is intermediate between intermetallic phases and ionic compounds.

== Production ==
This salt may be produced from the reaction between aqueous polonium hydride and sodium metal:

H_{2}Po + 2 Na → Na_{2}Po + H_{2}

This method of synthesis is hampered by the chemical instability of hydrogen polonide.

Sodium polonide may also be produced by heating sodium and polonium together at 300–400 °C.

== Crystal structure ==
Like lithium polonide and potassium polonide, sodium polonide has the antifluorite structure.
