= Lithium polonide =

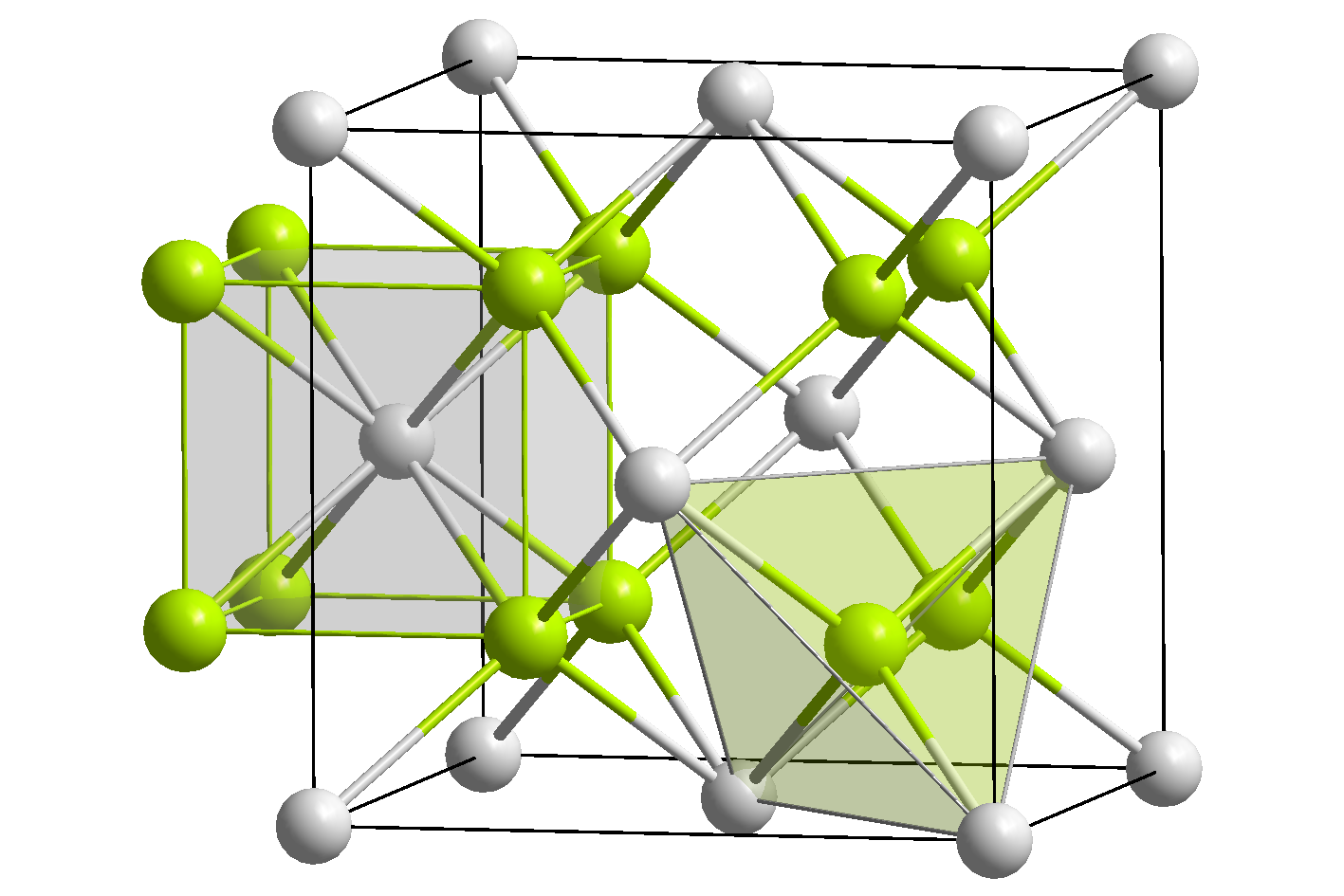
- Crystal structure of lithium polonide __ Li^{+} __ Po^{2-}

Names
- Preferred IUPAC name Lithium polonide

Identifiers
3D model (JSmol)	Interactive image
- InChI: InChI=1S/2Li.Po/q2*+1;-2
- SMILES: [Li+].[Li+].[Po-2]

Properties
Chemical formula	Li_{2}Po
Molar mass	222.86 g/mol
Appearance	greyish

Related compounds
Other anions	Lithium oxide Lithium sulfide Lithium selenide Lithium telluride
Other cations	Polonium hydride Sodium polonide Potassium polonide
- Except where otherwise noted, data are given for materials in their standard state (at 25 °C [77 °F], 100 kPa). Infobox references

Lithium polonide is a chemical compound with the formula Li_{2}Po. It is a polonide, a set of very chemically stable compounds of polonium.

== Production ==
Lithium polonide may be produced from a redox reaction between aqueous polonium hydride and lithium metal or from an acid-base reaction of H_{2}Po with strong lithium-containing bases:

H_{2}Po + 2 Li → Li_{2}Po + H_{2}

It may also be produced by heating lithium and polonium together at 300–400 °C.

== Crystal structure ==
Like sodium polonide, lithium polonide has the antifluorite structure.
