= Potassium polonide =

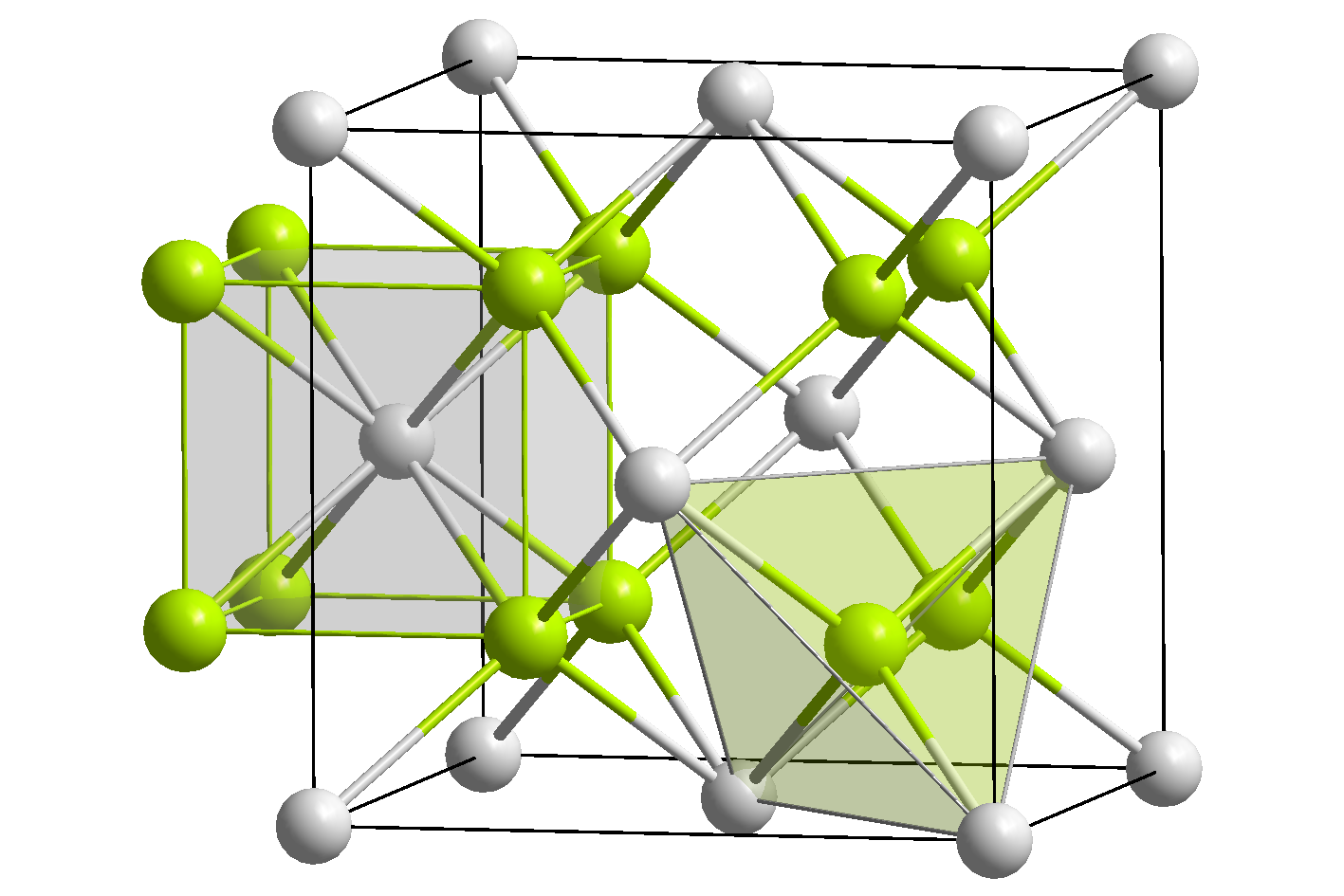
- Crystal structure of potassium polonide __ K^{+} __ Po^{2-}

Names
- Preferred IUPAC name Potassium polonide

Identifiers
3D model (JSmol)	Interactive image
- InChI: InChI=1S/2K.Po/q2*+1;-2 Key: NUJFXRJXZUAAQT-UHFFFAOYSA-N
- SMILES: [K+].[K+].[Po-2]

Properties
Chemical formula	K_{2}Po
Molar mass	287.18 g/mol
Appearance	greyish

Related compounds
Other anions	Potassium oxide Potassium sulfide Potassium selenide Potassium telluride
Other cations	Lithium polonide Sodium polonide Rubidium polonide Caesium polonide
- Except where otherwise noted, data are given for materials in their standard state (at 25 °C [77 °F], 100 kPa). Infobox references

Potassium polonide is a chemical compound with the formula K_{2}Po. It is a polonide, a set of very chemically stable compounds of polonium.

== Characteristics ==
Potassium polonide is thermally more unstable and has stronger electron affinity than potassium telluride (K_{2}Te).

== Production ==
Potassium polonide may be produced from a redox reaction between polonium hydride and potassium metal:

H_{2}Po + 2 K → K_{2}Po + H_{2}

It may also be produced by heating potassium and polonium together at 300–400 °C. At higher temperature, this reaction may reverse.

== Crystal structure ==
Like sodium polonide, potassium polonide has the antifluorite structure.
