= Talison Minerals =

Australian mining company

Talison Minerals Pty Ltd was a mining company based in Australia. It was split into Talison Lithium (as of 2020 a 51:49 joint venture between Tianqi Lithium and Albemarle Corporation) and Talison Tantalum, now known as Global Advanced Metals, in 2009. The two largest mining operations of the company were the Greenbushes mine near Greenbushes, Western Australia and Wodgina, Pilbara Region, Western Australia.
