= Greenbushes mine =

Lithium mine in Western Australia

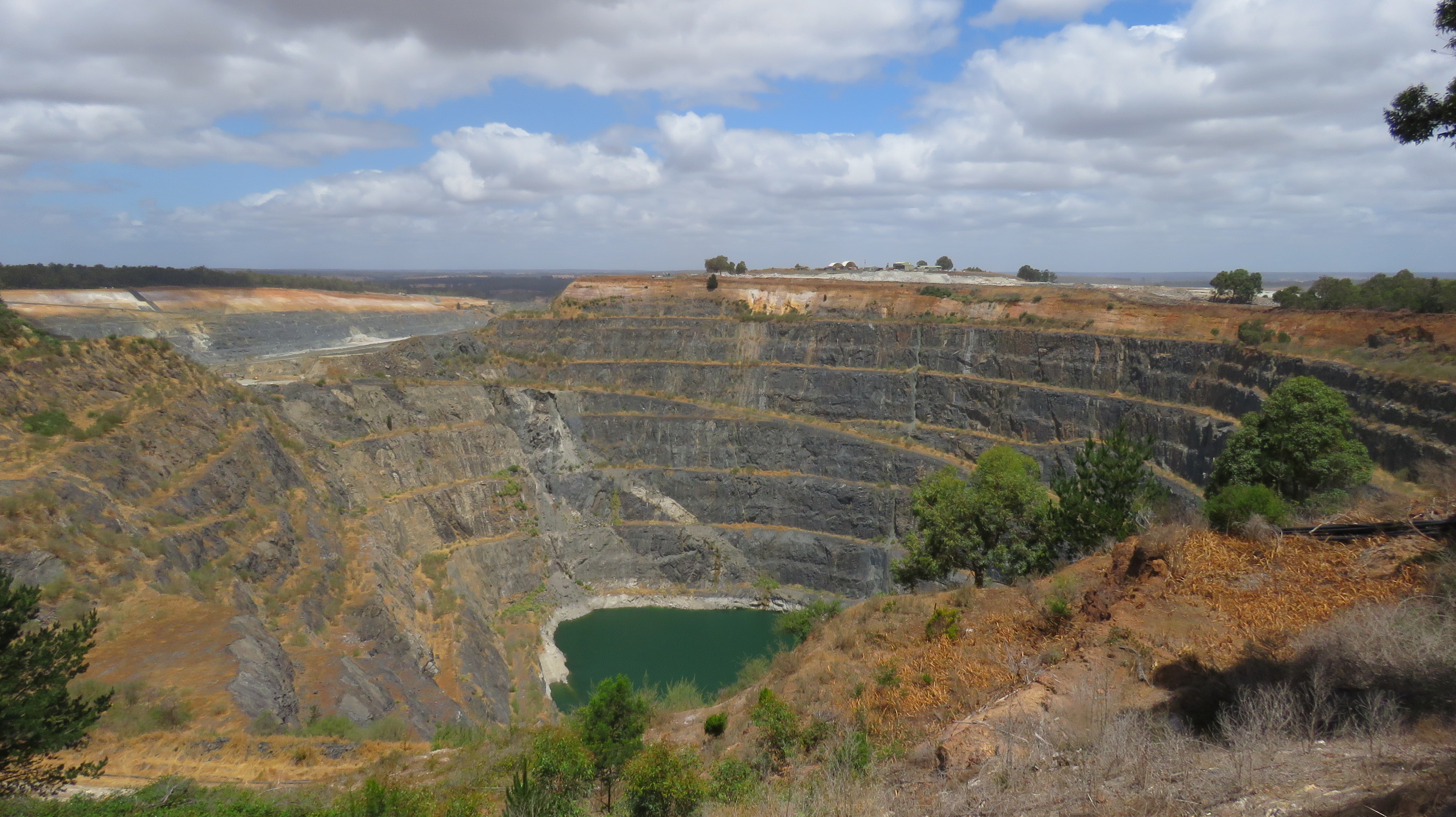
- View of the open pit at the Greenbushes mine in January 2023

- Location in Western Australia
- Interactive map of Greenbushes mine
- Location: Greenbushes, Western Australia, Australia; 33°51′58″S 116°03′53″E
- Products: Lithium
- Production: 1.95 million t (4.3 billion lb)
- Financial year: 2020
- Type: Open-pit
- Discovered: 1906
- Opened: 1983
- Company: Talison Lithium
- Website: www.talisonlithium.com/greenbushes-project
- Acquired: 2014

Greenbushes mine is an open-pit lithium mining operation located south of the town of Greenbushes, Western Australia. It is the world's largest hard-rock lithium mine, producing approximately 1.95 million tonnes (4.3 billion pounds) of lithium spodumene annually. The mine is 257 kilometres (160 miles) south of Perth and 90 kilometres (56 miles) southeast of the port of Bunbury.

The mine is owned and operated by Talison Lithium, which is a joint venture partnership as of 2014 between the Tianqi Lithium Corporation (owning 51%) and the Albemarle Corporation (49%). At the mine's current size, it can fulfil a third of the worldwide demand for lithium spodumene concentrate, which is used to produce lithium hydroxide, a component of lithium-ion batteries.

Global demand for lithium is expected to grow at a rate of 33.3% annually, and as such the mine is undergoing expansion along with the construction of the two nearby lithium processing facilities. The Kemerton facility is owned by Albemarle Corporation and the Kwinana facility is owned by Tianqi. Lithium industry revenue has increased at an annual rate of 8.6% from 2019–2020, to a total of $2.7 billion.

== Operations ==
The Greenbushes mine is the world's largest hard rock lithium mine in terms of reserves, resources, production, and capacity. The facility's operations are made up of the mine and two nearby processing facilities that convert the raw lithium spodumene concentrate into lithium hydroxide before being sold to global battery manufacturers including LG Chem, CATL and Northvolt.

In the past, brine mining for lithium has been more cost effective and easier than hard-rock lithium mining. However, projections show that the Greenbushes mine may be the first site where hard-rock mining is as cost effective and profitable as brine mining, as the processing will take place next to the extraction site.

As of 2018, Talison was operating the Greenbushes mine at 60% of its total capacity. It is estimated that if the facility were operated at 100% capacity it could fulfil total global lithium demand by itself. In January 2024 production was scaled down as the market for lithium deteriorated in the face of weak electric vehicle uptake.

=== Processing facilities ===
The twin processing facilities nearby (Albemarle's Kemerton plant and Tianqi's Kwinana plant, located in nearby Kemerton and Kwinana, respectively) are currently under construction.

==== Kwinana ====
The Kwinana plant is located 250 kilometres (160 mi) north of the Greenbushes site, and is undergoing the final stage of commissioning for the first part of its operation. The total capacity of the plant is reported as 48 thousand tonnes (110 million pounds) per annum. It will be Australia's first lithium recycling plant.

The Kwinana facility is the first fully automated battery-grade lithium hydroxide manufacturing facility outside of mainland China and can operate 24/7. The facility is also the first hard-rock sourced lithium chemical manufacturing facility outside of China.

The Kwinana facility is expected to provide 200 local jobs for the Kwinana community when it begins operations.

The Kwinana facility was due to be completed by 2019 however, due to financial constraints of their parent Tianqi and the COVID-19 outbreak have seen it still awaiting the commencement of production as of December 2020.

==== Kemerton ====
The Kemerton plant is 100 kilometres (62 mi) north of the Greenbushes facility, and is still undergoing preliminary construction.

Albemarle has recently announced that they have delayed the start of construction of their Kemerton plant until sometime in 2021 and have scaled back growth plans due to lithium growing pains.

== Greenbushes lithium deposit ==
The Greenbushes deposit contains the highest-grade quality lithium spodumene in the world. The recently discovered nearby Kapanga deposit is described as,

a giant pegmatite dike of Archean age with substantial Li-Sn-Ta mineralization, including half the world’s tantalum resource.

The mine is estimated to have resources of 8.7 million tonnes (19 billion pounds) LCE and reserves of 6.8 million tonnes (15 billion pounds) LCE. The mine sets a chemical-grade specifications benchmark of 6.0% Li_{2}O minimum and 0.8% Fe_{2}O_{3} maximum.

== Ownership ==
The mine was bought by Tianqi Lithium Corporation in 2013. However, Tianqi soon came into financial difficulties and was forced to offload the minority stake in the mine to the competing bidder, the American-based Albemarle Corporation in 2014. The 49% owner, Albemarle Corporation is based in Charlotte, North Carolina, and is one of the world's largest lithium producers.

The majority owner, Tianqi Lithium Corporation, is based in Chengdu, China, and is listed on the Shanghai stock exchange. As of 2018, the company controls more than 46% of the world's global production of lithium. Tianqi Lithium Corporation is the second largest lithium company in the world by revenue and the largest in China.

The entity Windfield Holdings (51% ownership) was established to purchase the mine and later 49% of its stock was sold. Windfield wholly owns Talison Lithium, the entity that owns and operates the Greenbushes mine.

Similarly, Albemarle owns their 49% stake in Windfield through an entity known as RT Lithium. The mine was originally owned and built by Talison Lithium that has been operating for over 128 years mining tin, tantalum, and lithium. The mine has been producing lithium concentrates for over 20 years, since 1983 when it became the world's first company to produce lithium concentrates from a hard-rock facility.

The lithium production industry is dominated by only four companies – Talison, SQM, Albemarle and FMC. Geographically, Australia, China and Chile also account for about 85% of global lithium production.

== Recent events ==
The joint venture partnership has come into turmoil recently due to Tianqi Corporation's financial problems, exhibited in part by the fact that in March 2020, MSP Engineering took Tianqi Lithium Kwinana – the entity that operates the Kwinana processing facility – to the Supreme Court of Western Australia with a lawsuit claiming unpaid invoices of A$35.9 million. Part of Tianqi's problems emerged from their recent purchase of 20% of Chilean lithium producer SQM. As of October 2020 the case is undergoing legal arbitration. SQM is also a Wesfarmers partner in their new Kwinana processing facility. In 2020, Wesfarmers announced that they intend to continue with their plans for their facility despite the financial trouble of current producers. They did, however, postpone the final investment decision on their Mount Holland lithium project to build a 45-thousand-tonne (99-million-pound) per annum lithium hydroxide processing facility until sometime in the first quarter of 2021.

Tianqi ultimate parent notes in their financial disclosures that they may be forced to offload part of its 49% stake in the mine or the Kwinana processing facility nearby. Albemarle was named as a potential bidder, while they have also delayed the expansion plans of their Kwinana plant.

Albemarle has recently announced that they have delayed the start of construction of their Kemerton plant until sometime in 2021 and have scaled back growth plans due to lithium growing pains. Although, demand for lithium-ion batteries has grown rapidly the lithium mining industries expansion has largely outpaced demand for lithium hydroxide. As such lithium mining has proved less profitable than mining for other minerals that are also inputs for batteries such as cobalt. Lithium is also relatively more abundant than other minerals that are seeing similar growth in demand.

The Kwinana facility was due to be completed by 2019, however due to financial constraints of their parent Tianqi and the COVID-19 outbreak has seen it still awaiting the commencement of production as of the end of 2020.
