= Ganfeng Lithium =

Chinese lithium company

Ganfeng Lithium Co., Ltd.
- Native name: 赣锋锂业股份有限公司
- Type: publicly traded company
- Traded as: SZSE: 002460; SEHK: 1772
- Industry: Mining
- Founded: 2000; 26 years ago
- Headquarters: Longteng Road, Economic Development Zone, Xinyu, Jiangxi Province, China
- Key people: Li Liangbin (李良彬, chair); Wang Xiaoshen (王晓申, vice-chair and president)
- Products: Lithium products and other metals
- Number of employees: 7,870 (2020)
- Website: http://www.ganfenglithium.com/

Ganfeng Lithium
- Simplified Chinese: 赣锋锂业
- Traditional Chinese: 贛鋒鋰業
Transcriptions
Standard Mandarin
- Hanyu Pinyin: Gànfēng Lǐ Yè

Ganfeng Lithium Co., Ltd. is a company that produces lithium, lithium products, other metals, and batteries in mainland China and globally. It was founded by Li Liangbin in 2000 and is headquartered in Xinyu, Jiangxi. It is the largest lithium salt producer in China and the third largest in the world, as well as the second largest lithium processor in the world (after the Chilean Sociedad Química y Minera). It is traded on both the Shenzhen Stock Exchange (SZSE: 002460) and the Hong Kong Stock Exchange (SEHK: 1772) and has a market capitalization of US$26 billion.

== Origins ==
Ganfeng Lithium was founded in 2000 by Li Liangbin (李良彬) and Li Huabiao (李华彪) in Xinyu City, Jiangxi. In 2003, the company built a lithium production base. The company's leaders, Li Liangbin and Wang Xiaoshen (王晓申), are both of poor, rural origins.

The company started out in chemical processing, but it has expanded its scope by developing mines internationally. In 2017 it began producing batteries for the growing electric vehicle industry. Wang said Ganfeng's battery production would benefit from an economy of scope: "We are the leading supplier of lithium chemicals which will benefit our battery plant."

== Products and activities ==
Described as a "lithium supermarket", Ganfeng sells a wide variety of lithium and related products, including lithium salts, other metals, and batteries. Its lithium salt production capacity was estimated at 120,000 tons per year as of 2021. As of 2019, it is the largest pure lithium producer in the world. As of 2022, it is also the largest lithium salt producer in China and the third largest in the world, as well as the second largest lithium processor in the world (after the Chilean Sociedad Química y Minera). In 2020, Ganfeng produced an estimated 24% of the world's lithium hydroxide. It sells products to clients including Tesla, BMW, and LG Chem.

Ganfeng invests in lithium projects overseas and says its "strategy is to secure long-term competitive resources". It owns three lithium brine projects in Argentina and was the largest shareholder of Lithium Americas in 2021. In 2014, Ganfeng invested in the Mariana lithium-potassium brine project in Argentina. In 2015, the company invested in the Australian company Reed Industrial Minerals, gaining rights to its Mount Marion spodumene project. In 2021, it acquired a 50% ownership stake in the Goulamina mine, a lithium mine in Mali's Ségou Region. The company also has investments and contracts in China, Ireland, Mexico, and the Democratic Republic of the Congo.

This international scope makes Ganfeng vulnerable to geopolitical tension. Its former supplier Joe Lowry said that the company would be "treading a fine line" between international pressures; Ganfeng risks being affected by US government actions targeting Chinese companies or by Chinese government intervention in the electric vehicle industry. Governments in Latin America have also taken steps that may limit Ganfeng's opportunities there; for instance, Mexican president Andrés Manuel López Obrador has worked to nationalize the country's lithium.

== Stock market listings ==
The company is dual-listed on the Hong Kong Stock Exchange and the Shenzhen Stock Exchange. As of August 2022, it has a market capitalization of US$26 billion.

On 10 August 2010, the company had an IPO on the Shenzhen Stock Exchange. It issued 25 million new shares at a price of 20.7 RMB each, raising 517.5 million RMB.

On 11 October 2018, it had an IPO on the main board of the Hong Kong Stock Exchange at a list price range of 16.50–26.50 HKD. The company issued 200,185,800 H shares, raising 3.171 billion HKD, which it used to expand its lithium-related activities. China Structural Reform Fund, LG, Samsung, Dongfeng Motor Corporation, FAW Group, and GoldenSand Capital were the six cornerstone investors.

In July 2022, Ganfeng announced that it was being investigated by the China Securities Regulatory Commission in a possible insider trading case. The company's stock fell 7% on the Shenzhen stock exchange after the announcement.

== See also ==
- Tianqi Lithium
