= Spodumene =

Pyroxene, inosilicate mineral rich in lithium

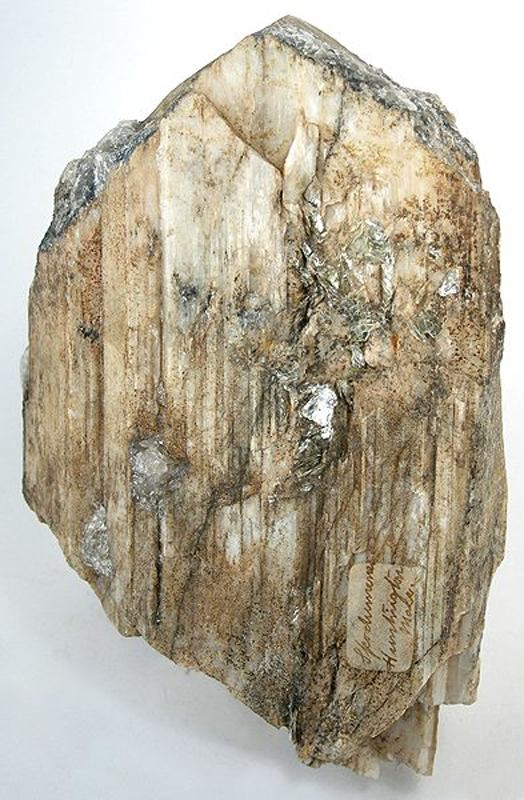
- Walnut Hill Pegmatite Prospect, Huntington, Hampshire County, Massachusetts, U.S. (size: 14.2 × 9.2 × 3.0 cm)

General
- Category: Inosilicate minerals (single chain)
- Group: Pyroxene group, clinopyroxene subgroup
- Formula: lithium aluminium silicate, LiAl(SiO_{3})_{2}
- IMA symbol: Spd
- Strunz classification: 9.DA.30
- Dana classification: 65.1.4.1
- Crystal system: Monoclinic
- Crystal class: Prismatic (2/m) (same H-M symbol)
- Space group: C2/c
- Unit cell: a = 9.46 Å, b = 8.39 Å c = 5.22 Å β = 110.17°; Z = 4

Identification
- Color: Highly variable: white, colorless, gray, pink, lilac, violet, yellow and green, may be bicolored; emerald green – hiddenite; lilac – kunzite; yellow – triphane
- Crystal habit: prismatic, generally flattened and elongated, striated parallel to {100}, commonly massive
- Twinning: Common on {100}
- Cleavage: Perfect prismatic, two directions {110} ∧ {11̅0} at 87°
- Fracture: Uneven to subconchoidal
- Tenacity: Brittle
- Mohs scale hardness: 6.5–7
- Luster: Vitreous, pearly on cleavage
- Streak: white
- Specific gravity: 3.03–3.23
- Optical properties: Biaxial (+)
- Refractive index: n_{α} = 1.648–1.661 n_{β} = 1.655–1.670 n_{γ} = 1.662–1.679
- Birefringence: δ = 0.014–0.018
- Pleochroism: Strong in kunzite: α-purple, γ-colorless; hiddenite: α-green, γ-colorless
- 2V angle: 54° to 69°
- Fusibility: 3.5
- Solubility: insoluble
- Other characteristics: Tenebrescence, chatoyancy

Spodumene is a pyroxene mineral consisting of lithium aluminium inosilicate, LiAl(SiO_{3})_{2}, and is a commercially important source of lithium. It occurs as colorless to yellowish, purplish, or lilac kunzite (see below), or alternatively yellowish-green or emerald-green hiddenite; it takes the form of prismatic crystals, often of great size. Single crystals of 14.3 m (47 ft) in size are reported from the Black Hills of South Dakota, United States.

The naturally occurring low-temperature form α-spodumene is in the monoclinic system, and the high-temperature β-spodumene crystallizes in the tetragonal system. α-Spodumene converts to β-spodumene at temperatures above 900 °C. Typically crystals are heavily striated along the principal axis. Crystal faces are often etched and pitted with triangular markings.

== Discovery and occurrence ==
Spodumene was first described in 1800 for an occurrence in the type locality in Utö, Södermanland, Sweden. It was discovered by Brazilian naturalist Jose Bonifacio de Andrada e Silva. The name is derived from the Greek spodumenos (σποδούμενος), meaning "burnt to ashes", owing to the opaque ash-grey appearance of material refined for use in industry.

Spodumene occurs in lithium-rich granite pegmatites and aplites. Associated minerals include quartz, albite, petalite, eucryptite, lepidolite, and beryl.

Transparent material has long been used as a gemstone with varieties kunzite and hiddenite noted for their strong pleochroism. Source localities include the Democratic Republic of Congo (DRC), Afghanistan, Australia, Brazil, Madagascar (see mining), Pakistan, Québec in Canada, and North Carolina and California in the U.S.

As of 2018, the DRC was known to have the largest lithium spodumene hard-rock deposit in the world, with mining operations occurring in the central DRC territory of Manono, Tanganyika Province. As of 2021, the Australian company AVZ Minerals was developing the Manono Lithium and Tin project, and had a resource size estimate of 400 million tonnes of high-grade low-impurity ore at 1.65% lithium oxide (Li_{2}O) spodumene hard-rock based on studies and drilling of Roche Dure, one of several pegmatites in the deposit.
Mount Marion contains the world's second-biggest high-grade lithium mineral resources, with an estimated 71 million tonnes (160 billion pounds) of the mineral spodumene under ownership of Mineral Resources and Jiangxi Ganfeng Lithium

== Economic importance ==
Spodumene is an important source of lithium, for use in ceramics, mobile phones and batteries (including for automotive applications), medicine, Pyroceram, and as a fluxing agent. As of 2019, around half of lithium is extracted from mineral ores, which mainly consist of spodumene. Lithium is recovered from spodumene by dissolution in acid, or extraction with other reagents, after roasting to convert it to the more reactive β-spodumene. The advantage of spodumene as a lithium source compared to brine sources is the higher lithium concentration, but at a higher extraction cost.

In 2016, the price of spodumene concentrate was forecast to be $500–600/ton for years to come. However, price spiked above $800 in January 2018, and production increased more than consumption, resulting in the price declining to $400 by September 2020.

World production of lithium via spodumene was around 80,000 metric tonnes per annum in 2018, primarily from the Greenbushes pegmatite of Western Australia and from some Chinese and Chilean sources. The Talison Minerals mine in Greenbushes, Western Australia (involving Tianqi Lithium, Albemarle Corporation, and Global Advanced Metals), is reported to be the world's second-largest and to have the highest grade of ore at 2.4% Li_{2}O (2012 figures).

In 2020, Australia expanded spodumene mining to become the leading lithium-producing country in the world.

An important economic concentrate of spodumene, known as spodumene concentrate 6 or SC6, is a high-purity lithium ore with around 6% lithium content being produced as a raw material for the subsequent production of lithium-ion batteries for electric vehicles.

== Refining ==
Extraction of lithium from spodumene, often SC6, is challenging due to the tight binding of lithium in the crystal structure.

Traditional lithium refining in the 2010s involves acid leaching of lithium-containing ores, precipitation of impurities, concentration of the lithium solution, and then conversion to lithium carbonate or lithium hydroxide. These refining methods result in significant quantities of caustic waste effluent and tailings, which are usually either highly acidic or alkali. Suitable extraction reagents include alkali metal sulfates, such as sodium sulfate, sodium carbonate, chlorine, or hydrofluoric acid.

Crystal structure of α-Spodumene

Another processing method relies on pyrometallurgical processing of SC6—roasting at high temperatures exceeding 800 °C (1,470 °F) to convert the spodumene from the tightly bound alpha structure to a more open beta structure from which the lithium is more easily extracted—then cooling and reacting with various reagents in a sequence of hydrometallurgical processing steps. Some offer the use of noncaustic reagents and result in reduced waste streams, potentially allowing the use of a closed-loop refining process.

Tesla developed and, as of 2025, is operationalizing at scale, a similar 6-8 step process of lithium refinement that does not require acids. They mix sodium chloride with the open-beta-structure spodumene concentrate and water. Agitation at high temperatures produces a lithium-rich slurry that can be filtered and purified into lithium hydroxide. Waste products include analcime, sands and limestone, which can be repurposed as construction materials. A Tesla refinery located on 1,200 acres in Robstown, Texas, uses this process. It began partial operation in December 2024. The site was chosen for its proximity to the Port of Corpus Christi, where spodumene can conveniently be imported.

A common form of refined lithium from both of the above processes is lithium hydroxide, commonly used as an input in the battery industry to manufacture lithium-ion (Li-ion) battery cathode material.

== Gemstone varieties ==
=== Hiddenite ===
Hiddenite is a pale, emerald-green gem variety first reported from Alexander County, North Carolina, U.S. It was named in honor of William Earl Hidden (16 February 1853 – 12 June 1918), mining engineer, mineral collector, and mineral dealer.

This emerald-green variety of spodumene is colored by chromium, just as for emeralds. Some green spodumene is colored with substances other than chromium; such stones tend to have a lighter color; they are not true hiddenite.

=== Kunzite ===
Kunzite is a purple-colored gemstone, a variety of spodumene, with the color coming from minor to trace amounts of manganese. Exposure to sunlight can fade its color.

Kunzite was discovered in 1902, and was named after George Frederick Kunz, Tiffany & Co's chief jeweler at the time, and a noted mineralogist. It has been found in Brazil, the U.S., Canada, CIS, Mexico, Sweden, Western Australia, Afghanistan, and Pakistan.

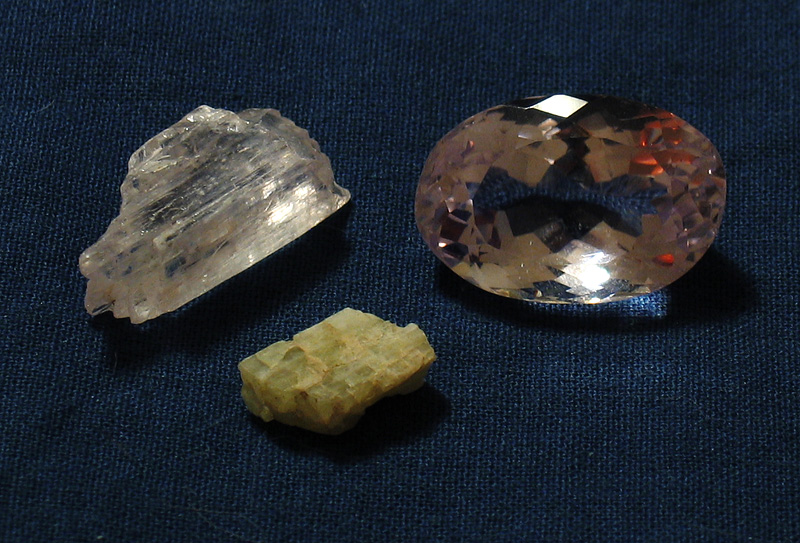
An almost colorless kunzite crystal (upper left), a cut pale pink kunzite (upper right), and a greenish hiddenite crystal (below) (unknown scale)

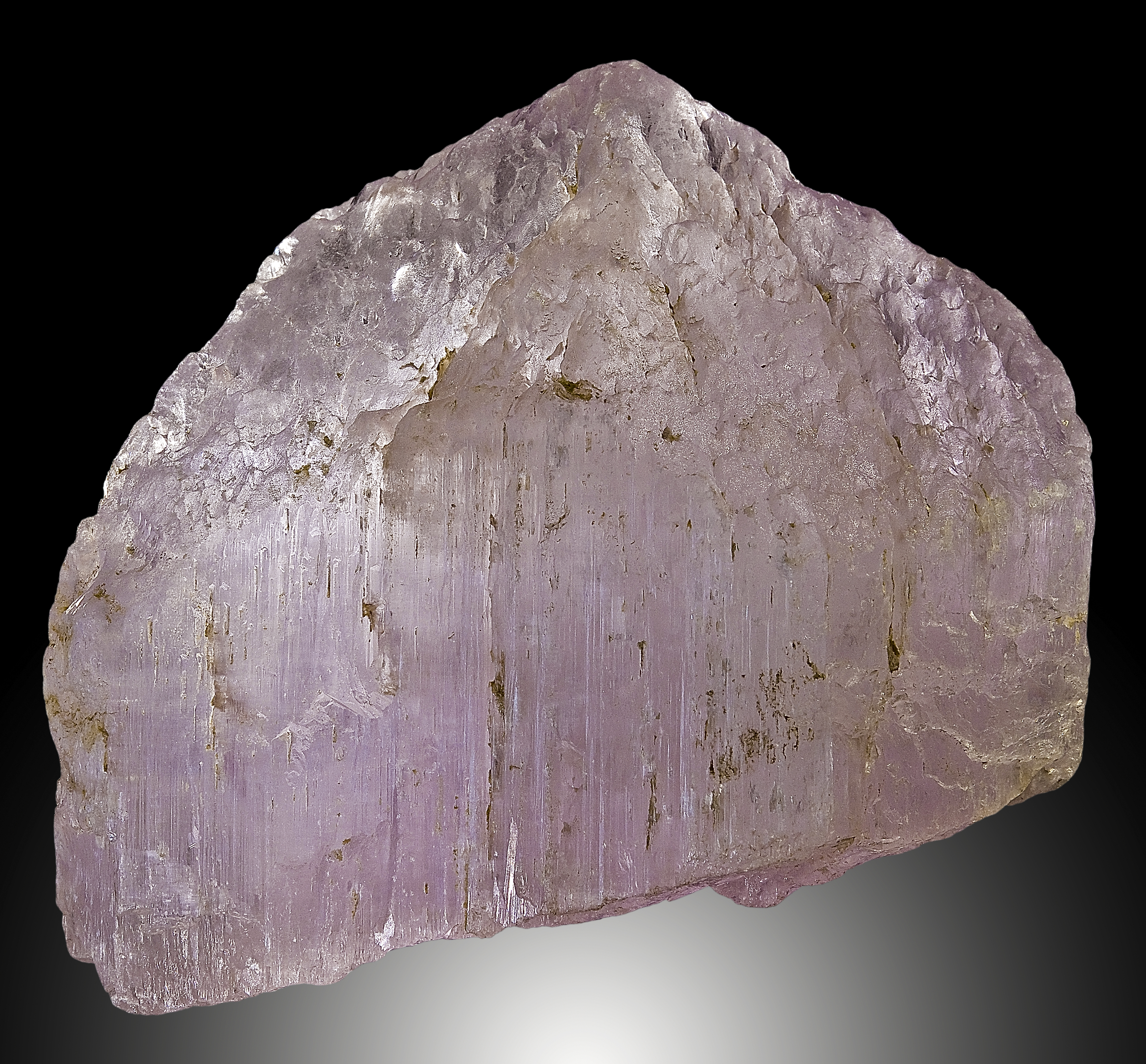
Kunzite, Nuristan Province, Afghanistan

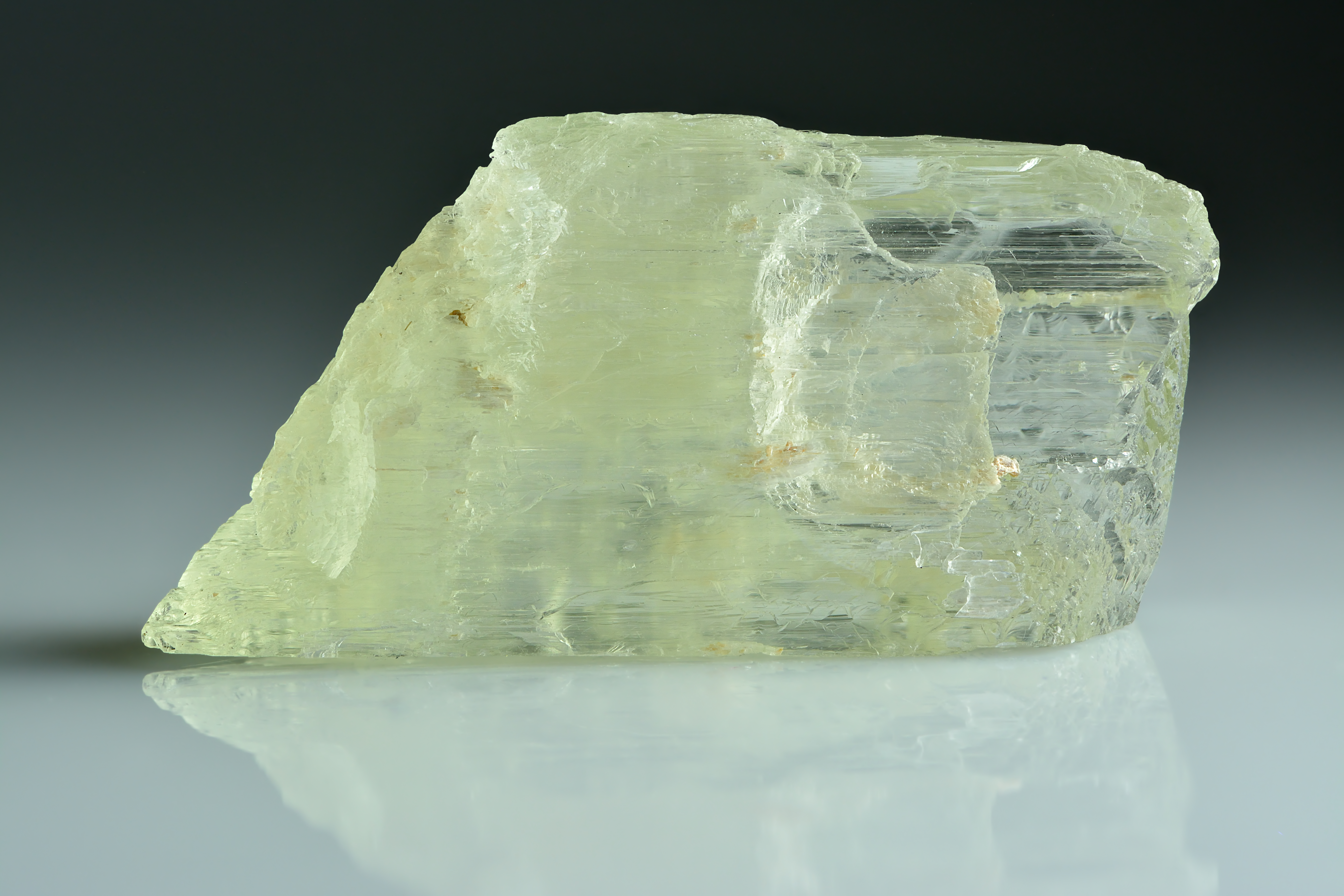
Hiddenite from Araçuaí, Minas Gerais, Brazil

=== Triphane ===
Triphane is the name used for yellowish varieties of spodumene.

== See also ==
- List of minerals
