= James Bay project =

Lithium mine in Quebec, Canada

- Location: James Bay, Quebec, Canada
- Products: Lithium

The James Bay project is a proposed lithium pegmatite mine in Canada. The project is located in eastern Canada in Quebec. The James Bay mine has reserves amounting to 22,200,000 tonnes (4.89×10^{10} lb) of lithium ore grading 0.58% lithium thus resulting in 130,000 tonnes (290,000,000 lb) of lithium.
