= Lithium oxide =

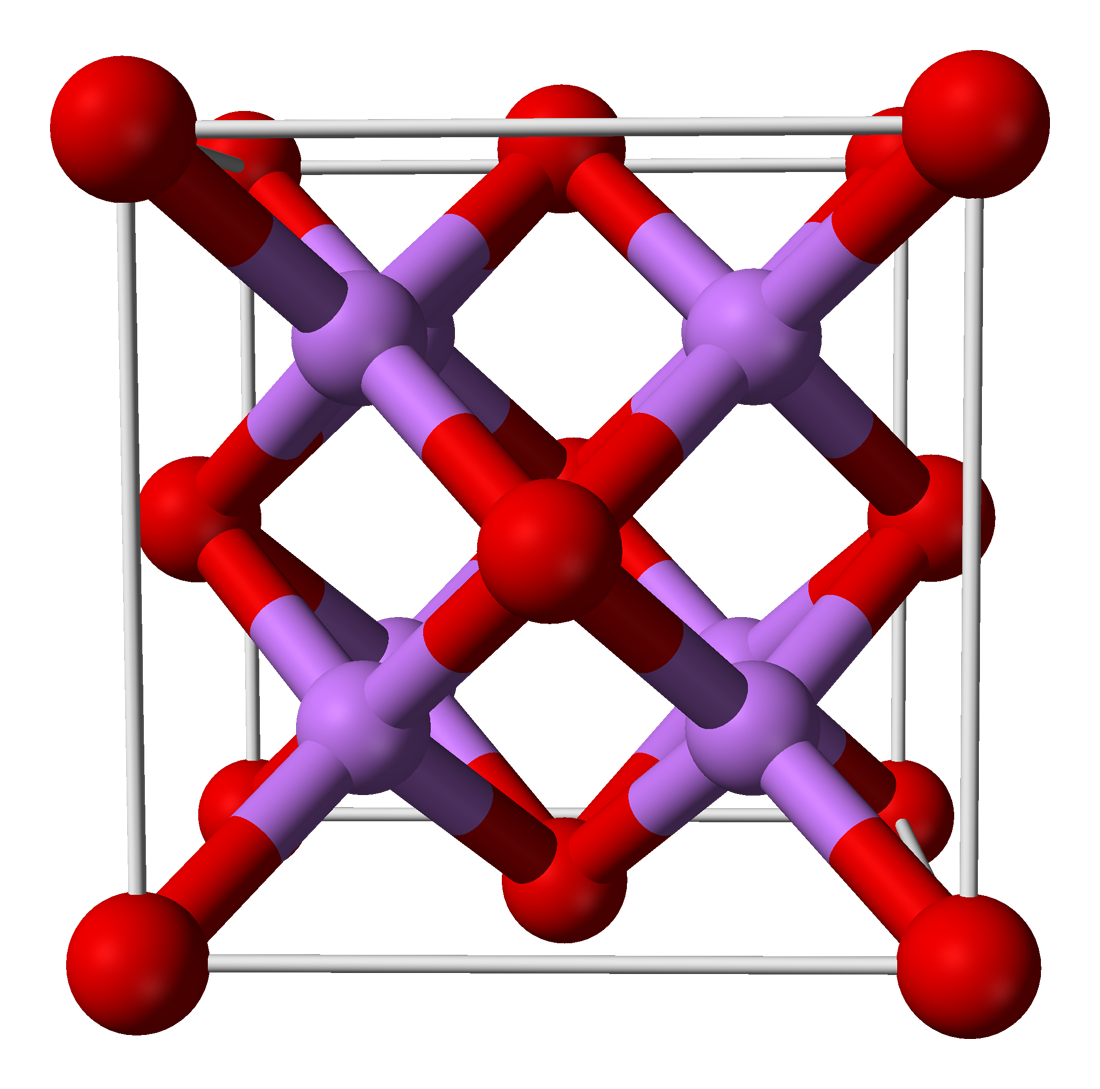

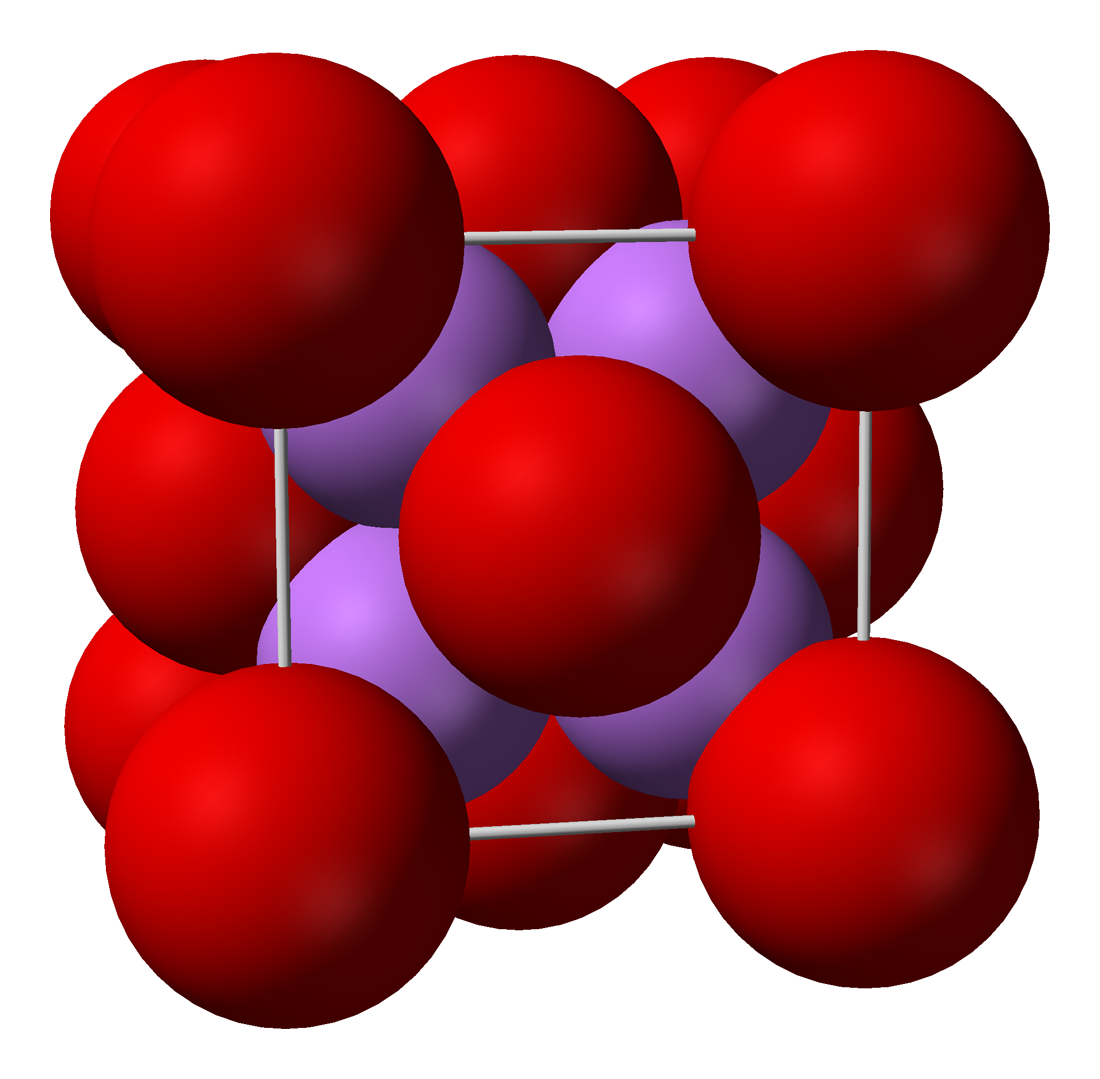

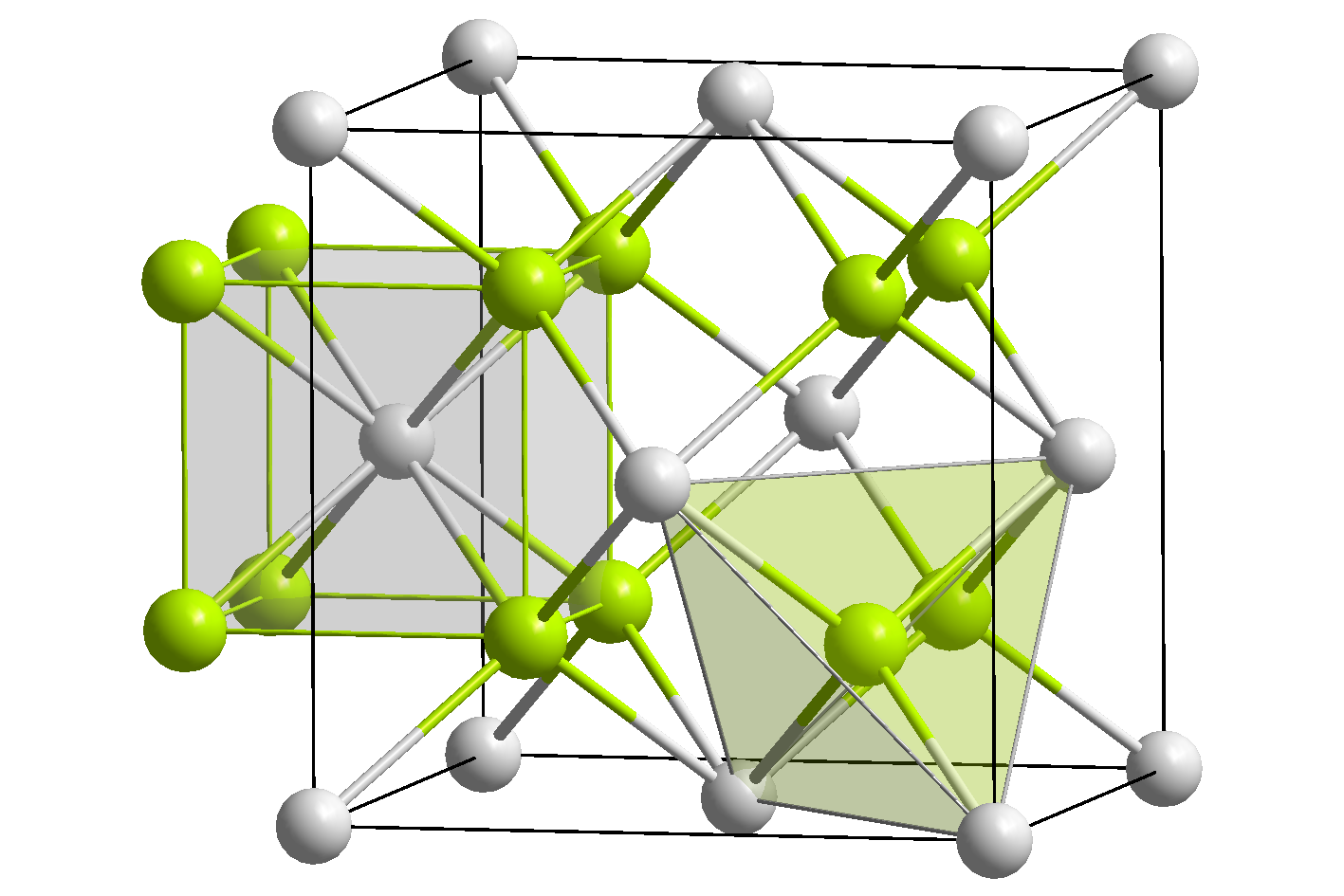
- __ Li^{+} __ O^{2−}

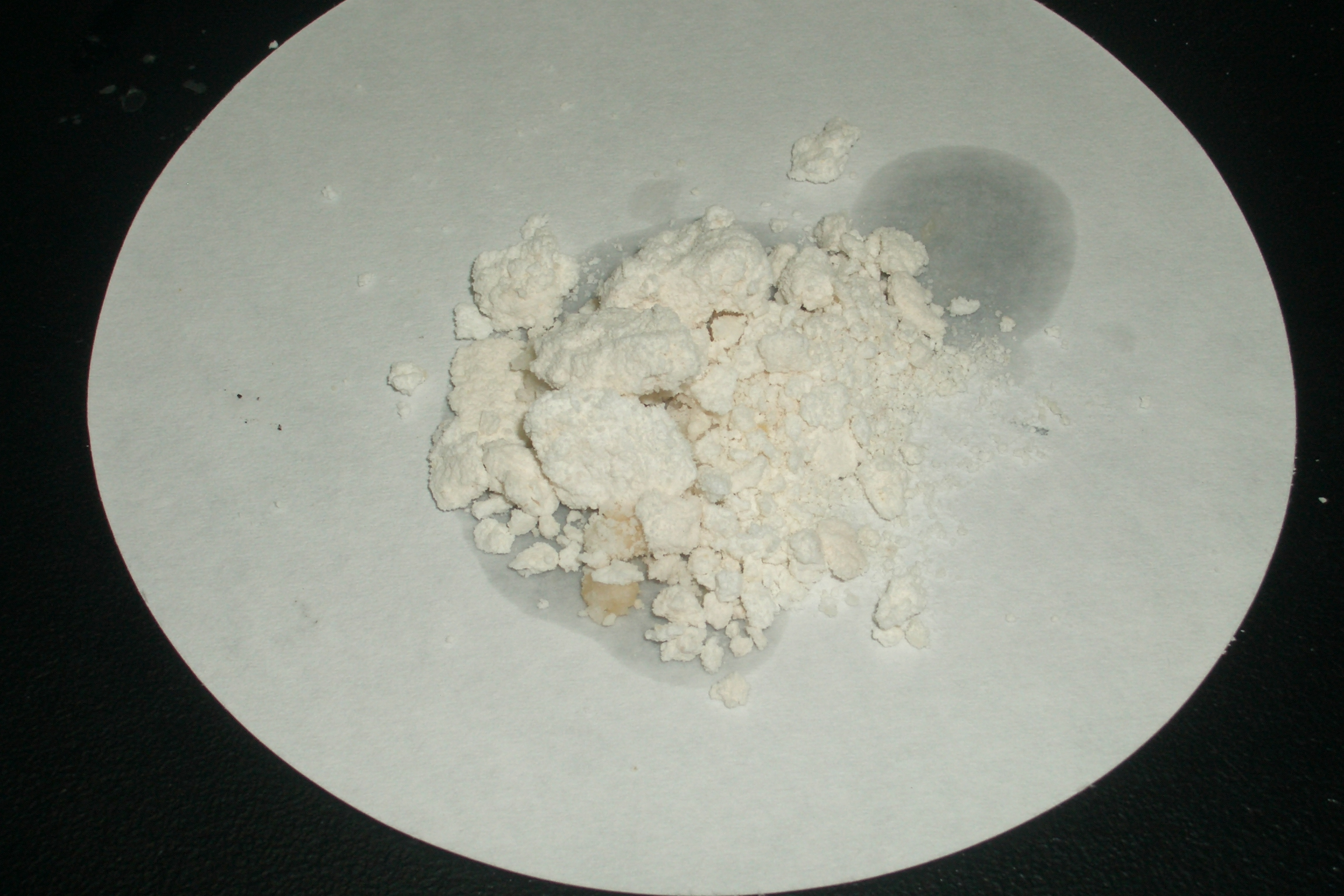

Names
- IUPAC name Lithium oxide
- Other names Lithia; Kickerite; Dilithium Monoxide; Dilithium Oxide

Identifiers
CAS Number	12057-24-8
3D model (JSmol)	Interactive image
ChemSpider	145811
ECHA InfoCard	100.031.823
PubChem CID	166630
RTECS number	OJ6360000
UNII	2ON0O9YI0Q
CompTox Dashboard (EPA)	DTXSID90923799 DTXSID10893208, DTXSID90923799
- InChI: InChI=1S/2Li.O/q2*+1;-2 Key: FUJCRWPEOMXPAD-UHFFFAOYSA-N; InChI=1S/2Li.O/q2*+1;-2 Key: FUJCRWPEOMXPAD-UHFFFAOYAW; Key: FUJCRWPEOMXPAD-UHFFFAOYSA-N
- SMILES: [Li+].[Li+].[O-2]

Properties
Chemical formula	Li_{2}O
Molar mass	29.88 g/mol
Appearance	white or pale yellow solid
Density	2.013 g/cm^{3}
Melting point	1,438 °C (2,620 °F; 1,711 K)
Boiling point	2,600 °C (4,710 °F; 2,870 K)
Solubility in water	Reacts to form LiOH
log P	9.23
Refractive index (n_{D})	1.644

Structure
Crystal structure	Antifluorite (cubic), cF12
Space group	Fm3̅m, No. 225
Coordination geometry	Tetrahedral (Li^{+}); cubic (O^{2−})

Thermochemistry
Heat capacity (C)	1.8105 J/g K or 54.1 J/mol K
Std molar entropy (S^{⦵}_{298})	37.89 J/mol K
Std enthalpy of formation (Δ_{f}H^{⦵}_{298})	−20.01 kJ/g or −595.8 kJ/mol
Gibbs free energy (Δ_{f}G^{⦵})	−562.1 kJ/mol

Hazards
- Occupational safety and health (OHS/OSH)
Main hazards	Corrosive, reacts violently with water
NFPA 704 (fire diamond)	3 0 1 W
Flash point	Non-flammable

Related compounds
Other anions	Lithium sulfide Lithium selenide Lithium telluride Lithium polonide
Other cations	Sodium oxide Potassium oxide Rubidium oxide Caesium oxide
Related lithium oxides	Lithium peroxide Lithium superoxide
Related compounds	Lithium hydroxide
- Except where otherwise noted, data are given for materials in their standard state (at 25 °C [77 °F], 100 kPa). verify (what is ?) Infobox references

Lithium oxide (Li_{2}O), or lithia, is an inorganic chemical compound. It is a white or pale yellow solid. Although not specifically important, many materials are assessed on the basis of their Li_{2}O content. For example, the Li_{2}O content of the principal lithium mineral spodumene (LiAlSi_{2}O_{6}) is 8.03%.

== Production ==
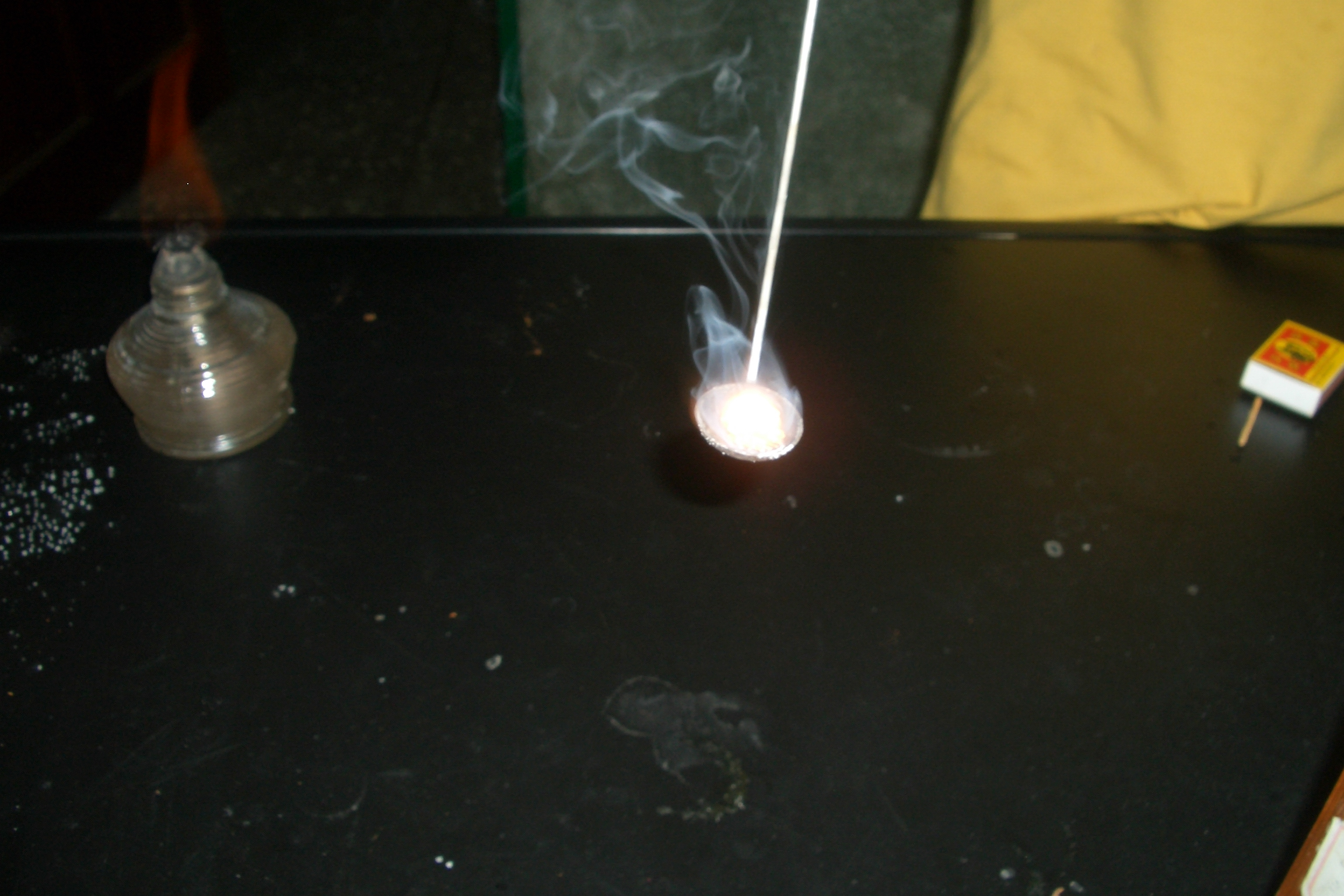
Burning lithium metal produces lithium oxide.

Lithium oxide forms along with small amounts of lithium peroxide when lithium metal is burned in the air and combines with oxygen at temperatures above 100 °C:

4Li + O_{2} → 2Li_{2}O.

Pure Li_{2}O can be produced by the thermal decomposition of lithium peroxide, Li_{2}O_{2}, at 450 °C

2Li_{2}O_{2} → 2Li_{2}O + O_{2}

== Structure ==
Solid lithium oxide adopts an antifluorite structure with four-coordinated Li+ centers and eight-coordinated oxides.

The ground state gas phase Li_{2}O molecule is linear with a bond length consistent with strong ionic bonding. VSEPR theory would predict a bent shape similar to H_{2}O.

The majority of crystallographic defects occur within the Li+ sub-lattice in the form of vacancies or Frenkel pairs. Schottky disorder can occur but is less favorable.

== Uses ==
Lithium oxide is used as a flux in ceramic glazes; and creates blues with copper and pinks with cobalt. Lithium oxide reacts with water and steam, forming lithium hydroxide and should be isolated from them.

== Reactions ==
Lithium oxide absorbs carbon dioxide forming lithium carbonate:

Li_{2}O + CO_{2} → Li_{2}CO_{3}

The oxide reacts slowly with water, forming lithium hydroxide:

Li_{2}O + H_{2}O → 2LiOH

== See also ==
- Lithium monoxide anion
- Lithium peroxide
- Lithium cobalt oxide
- Lithium-oxide memristor
