= Lithium hydroxide =

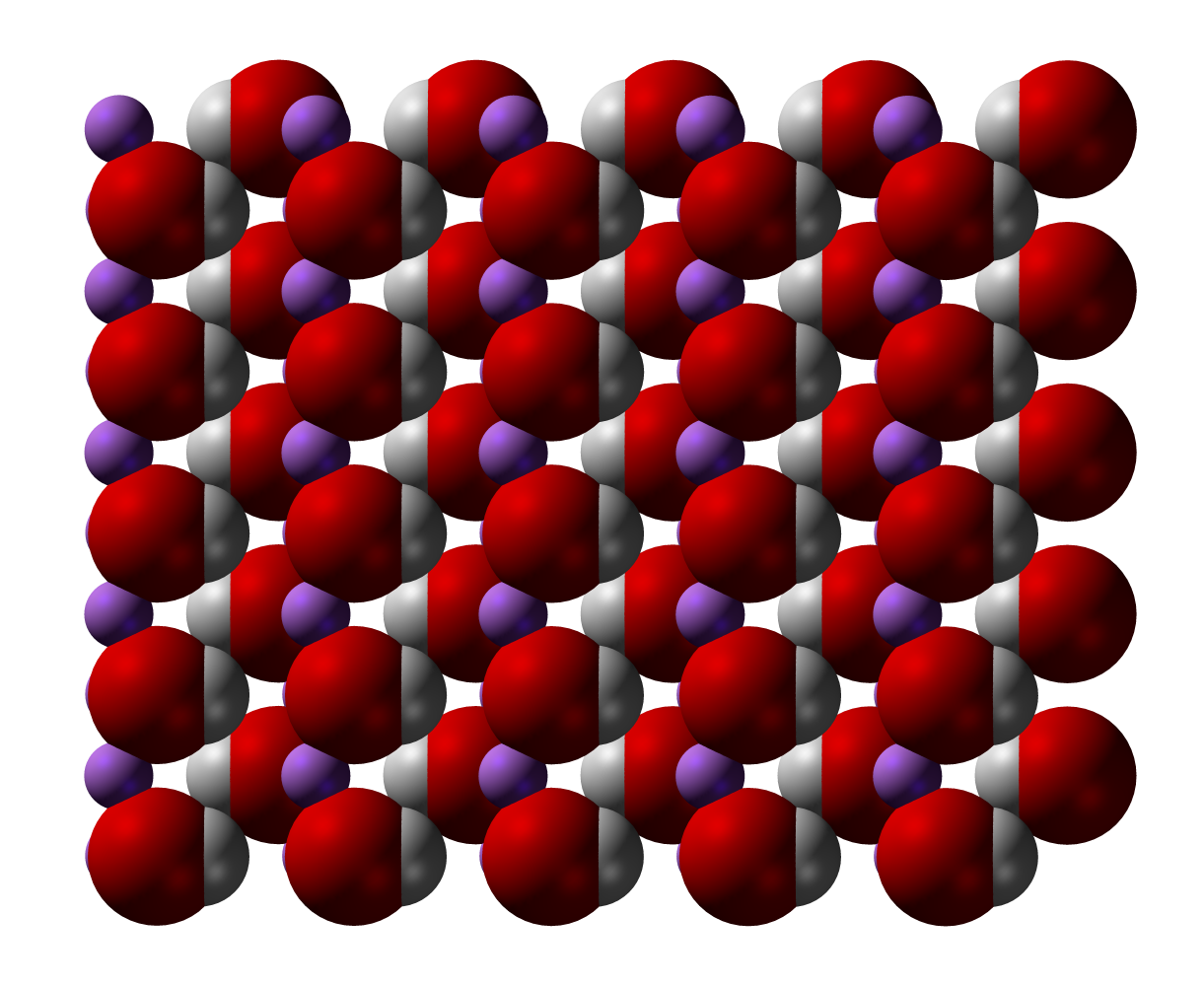
- Lithium hydroxide

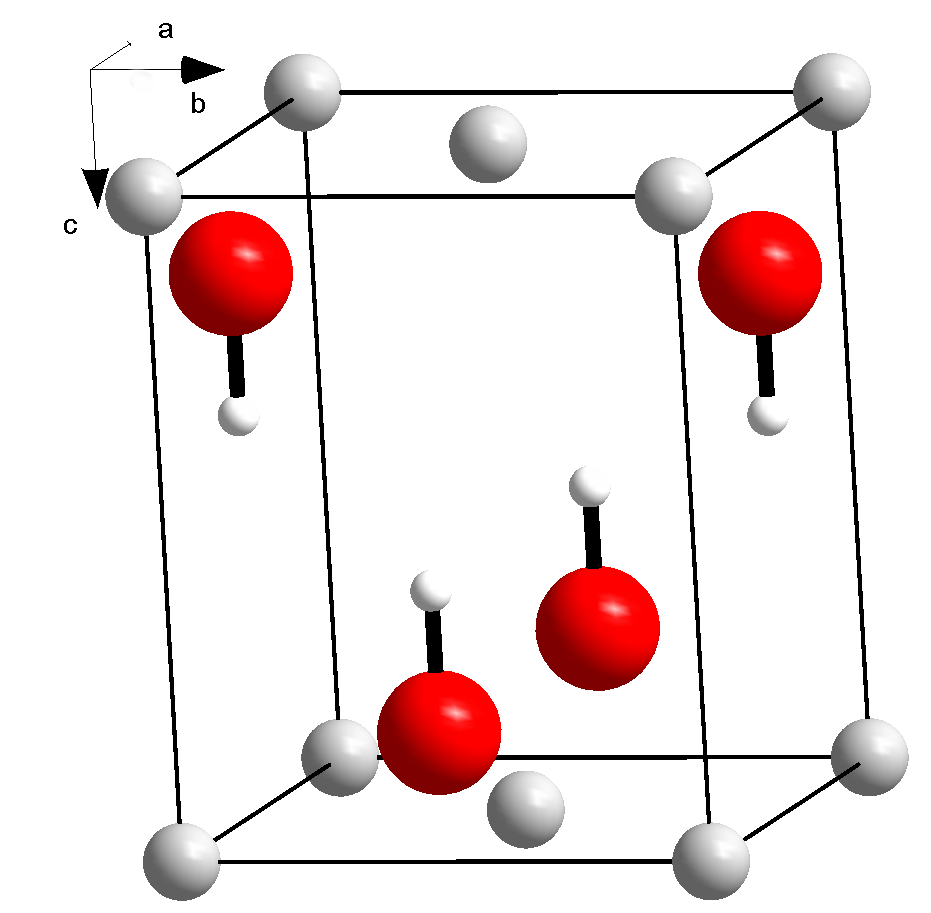
- Li^{+} O^{2−} H^{+}

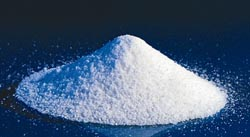
- Lithium-hydroxide.jpg

Names
- IUPAC name Lithium hydroxide

Identifiers
CAS Number	1310-65-2; 1310-66-3 (monohydrate)
3D model (JSmol)	Interactive image
ChEBI	CHEBI:33979
ChemSpider	3802
ECHA InfoCard	100.013.804
Gmelin Reference	68415
PubChem CID	3939
RTECS number	OJ6307070
UNII	903YL31JAS; G51XLP968G (monohydrate)
UN number	2680
CompTox Dashboard (EPA)	DTXSID70893845
- InChI: InChI=1S/Li.H2O/h;1H2/q+1;/p-1 Key: WMFOQBRAJBCJND-UHFFFAOYSA-M; InChI=1/Li.H2O/h;1H2/q+1;/p-1 Key: WMFOQBRAJBCJND-REWHXWO
- SMILES: [Li+].[OH-]

Properties
Chemical formula	LiOH
Molar mass	23.95 g/mol (anhydrous); 41.96 g/mol (monohydrate)
Appearance	white solid
Odor	none
Density	1.46 g/cm^{3} (anhydrous); 1.51 g/cm^{3} (monohydrate)
Melting point	462 °C (864 °F; 735 K)
Boiling point	924 °C (1,695 °F; 1,197 K) (decomposes)
Solubility in water	anhydrous: 12.7 g/(100 mL) (0 °C); 12.8 g/(100 mL) (20 °C); 17.5 g/(100 mL) (100 °C); monohydrate: 22.3 g/(100 mL) (10 °C); 26.8 g/(100 mL) (80 °C)
Solubility in methanol	9.76 g/(100 g) (anhydrous; 20 °C, 48 hours mixing); 13.69 g/(100 g) (monohydrate; 20 °C, 48 hours mixing)
Solubility in ethanol	2.36 g/(100 g) (anhydrous; 20 °C, 48 hours mixing); 2.18 g/(100 g) (monohydrate; 20 °C, 48 hours mixing)
Solubility in isopropanol	0 g/(100 g) (anhydrous; 20 °C, 48 hours mixing); 0.11 g/(100 g) (monohydrate; 20 °C, 48 hours mixing)
Acidity (pK_{a})	14.4
Conjugate base	Lithium monoxide anion
Magnetic susceptibility (χ)	−12.3·10^{−6} cm^{3}/mol
Refractive index (n_{D})	1.464 (anhydrous); 1.460 (monohydrate)
Dipole moment	4.754 D

Thermochemistry
Heat capacity (C)	49.6 J/(mol·K)
Std molar entropy (S^{⦵}_{298})	42.8 J/(mol·K)
Std enthalpy of formation (Δ_{f}H^{⦵}_{298})	−487.5 kJ/mol
Gibbs free energy (Δ_{f}G^{⦵})	−441.5 kJ/mol
Enthalpy of fusion (Δ_{f}H^{⦵}_{fus})	20.9 kJ/mol (at melting point)

Hazards
- Occupational safety and health (OHS/OSH)
Main hazards	Corrosive
NFPA 704 (fire diamond)	3 0 0
Flash point	Non-flammable
- Lethal dose or concentration (LD, LC)
LD_{50} (median dose)	210 mg/kg (oral, rat)
Safety data sheet (SDS)	"ICSC 0913". "ICSC 0914". (monohydrate)

Related compounds
Other anions	Lithium amide
Other cations	Sodium hydroxide; Potassium hydroxide; Rubidium hydroxide; Caesium hydroxide
Related compounds	Lithium oxide
- Except where otherwise noted, data are given for materials in their standard state (at 25 °C [77 °F], 100 kPa). verify (what is ?) Infobox references

Lithium hydroxide is an inorganic compound with the formula LiOH. It can exist as anhydrous or hydrated, and both forms are white hygroscopic solids. They are soluble in water and slightly soluble in ethanol. Both are available commercially. While classified as a strong base, lithium hydroxide is the weakest known alkali metal hydroxide.

== Production ==
The preferred feedstock is hard-rock spodumene, where the lithium content is expressed as % lithium oxide.

=== Lithium carbonate route ===
Lithium hydroxide is often produced industrially from lithium carbonate in a metathesis reaction with calcium hydroxide:

Li_{2}CO_{3} + Ca(OH)_{2} → 2 LiOH + CaCO_{3}

The initially produced hydrate is dehydrated by heating under vacuum up to 180 °C.

=== Lithium sulfate route ===
An alternative route involves the intermediacy of lithium sulfate:

α-spodumene → β-spodumene
β-spodumene + CaO → Li_{2}O + ...
Li_{2}O + H_{2}SO_{4} → Li_{2}SO_{4} + H_{2}O
Li_{2}SO_{4} + 2 NaOH → Na_{2}SO_{4} + 2 LiOH

The main by-products are gypsum and sodium sulphate, which have some market value.

== Commercial setting ==
According to Bloomberg, Ganfeng Lithium Co. Ltd. (GFL or Ganfeng) and Albemarle were the largest producers in 2020 with around 25kt/y, followed by Livent Corporation (FMC) and SQM. Significant new capacity is planned, to keep pace with demand driven by vehicle electrification. Ganfeng are to expand lithium chemical capacity to 85,000 tons, adding the capacity leased from Jiangte, Ganfeng will become the largest lithium hydroxide producer globally in 2021.

Albemarle's Kemerton, Western Australia plant, originally planned to deliver 100kt/y has been scaled back to 50kt/y.

In 2020 Tianqi Lithium's, plant in Kwinana, Western Australia was the largest producer, with a capacity of 48kt/y.

== Applications ==
=== Lithium-ion batteries ===
Lithium hydroxide is mainly consumed in the production of cathode materials for lithium-ion batteries such as lithium cobalt oxide (LiCoO_{2}) and lithium iron phosphate. It is preferred over lithium carbonate as a precursor for lithium nickel manganese cobalt oxides.

=== Grease ===
A popular lithium grease thickener is lithium 12-hydroxystearate, which produces a general-purpose lubricating grease due to its high resistance to water and usefulness at a range of temperatures.

=== Carbon dioxide scrubbing ===
Lithium hydroxide is used in breathing gas purification systems for spacecraft, submarines, and rebreathers to remove carbon dioxide from exhaled gas by producing lithium carbonate and water:

2 LiOH·H_{2}O + CO_{2} → Li_{2}CO_{3} + 3 H_{2}O

or

2 LiOH + CO_{2} → Li_{2}CO_{3} + H_{2}O

The latter, anhydrous hydroxide, is preferred for its lower mass and lesser water production for respirator systems in spacecraft. One gram of anhydrous lithium hydroxide can remove 450 cm^{3} of carbon dioxide gas. The monohydrate loses its water at 100–110 °C.

=== Precursor ===
Lithium hydroxide, together with lithium carbonate, is a key intermediates used for the production of other lithium compounds, illustrated by its use in the production of lithium fluoride:

LiOH + HF → LiF + H_{2}O

=== Other uses ===
It is also used in ceramics and some Portland cement formulations, where it is also used to suppress ASR (concrete cancer).

Lithium hydroxide (isotopically enriched in lithium-7) is used to alkalize the reactor coolant in pressurized water reactors for corrosion control. It is good radiation protection against free neutrons.

== Price ==
In 2012, the price of lithium hydroxide was about US$5–6/kg.

In December 2020, it had risen to $9/kg.

On 18 March 2021, the price had risen to $11.50/kg.

== See also ==
- Soda lime
