= Tianqi Lithium =

Chinese mining and manufacturing company

Tianqi Lithium Corporation
- Native name: 天齐锂业股份有限公司
- Type: publicly traded company
- Traded as: SZSE: 002466; SEHK: 9696
- Industry: Chemicals & Mining
- Founded: 2000; 26 years ago
- Headquarters: Building 1 No.10 East Gaopeng Road, High-tech Zone, Chengdu, Sichuan Province, China
- Key people: Jiang Weiping (蒋卫平, Founder & Chair); Jiang Anqi (蒋安琪, Vice Chair), Ha 'Frank' Chun Shing Ha (Director & CEO)
- Products: Lithium; Lithium Carbonate; Lithium Hydroxide Monohydrate; Lithium Chloride Anhydrous; Lithium Metal
- Revenue: ▲US$1.187 billion (2021)
- Operating income: ▲US$751 million (2021)
- Net income: ▲US$324 million (2021)
- Total assets: ▲US$6.845 billion (2021)
- Number of employees: 1,773 (2021)
- Website: http://www.tianqilithium.com

Tianqi Lithium Corp (Chinese: 天齐锂业; pinyin: Tiānqí Lǐ Yè; previously Sichuan Tianqi Lithium Industries, Inc.) is a Chinese mining and manufacturing company based in Sichuan.

By 2018, the company controlled more than 46% of the production of lithium worldwide.

== Production ==
World production of lithium via spodumene was around 80,000 metric tonnes per annum in 2018, primarily from the Greenbushes pegmatite of Western Australia and from some Chinese and Chilean sources. The Talison mine in Greenbushes, Western Australia, is reported to be the 2nd largest and to have the highest grade of ore at 2.4% Li_{2}O (2012 figures).

== Acquisitions ==
Tianqi has owned a 51% ownership stake in Talison Lithium, which operates the Greenbushes mine in Australia, since 2009. Tianqi announced in 2018 that it would invest US$600 million to construct a lithium processing plant in Kwinana, Western Australia.

In 2018, Tianqi acquired a 24% stake in the Chilean mining company Sociedad Química y Minera (SQM) for approximately $4.1 billion. Tianqi was to purchase 62.5 million SQM A shares for $65 each from Canadian fertilizer company Nutrien.

Tianqi Lithium has legally objected to the dismembering of SQM's lithium operation in Salar de Atacama into the new public-private joint venture Nova Andino Litio. Nova Andino Litio emerged in December 2025 from the merger of SQM's lithium operation and an ad-hoc subsidiary of Chilean state-owned Codelco. This objection was rejected by the Supreme Court of Chile in late January 2026. The SQM-Codelco agreement is set to last until 2060 at which point the Chilean state could seek new partners for lithium mining in SQM's former concession in Salar de Atacama.

Tianqi is currently in a legal dispute with MSP Engineering over the payment for building the lithium hydroxide plant in Kwinana Western Australia. MSP claim that Tianqi have failed to meet scheduled payments totalling over $39 million. A WA Supreme Court order handed down an order giving Tianqi seven days to pay MSP almost $39 million, something that Tianqi has refused to do, seeking a stay on the judgement. The matter is still before the courts.

== Carbon footprint ==
Tianqi Lithium Corp reported Total CO2e emissions (Direct + Indirect) for 31 December 2020 at 259 Kt.

== See also ==
- Spodumene
- Ganfeng Lithium
- Lithium Triangle
- Talison Lithium
- List of countries by lithium production
