= Greenbushes, Western Australia =

Greenbushes
- Town
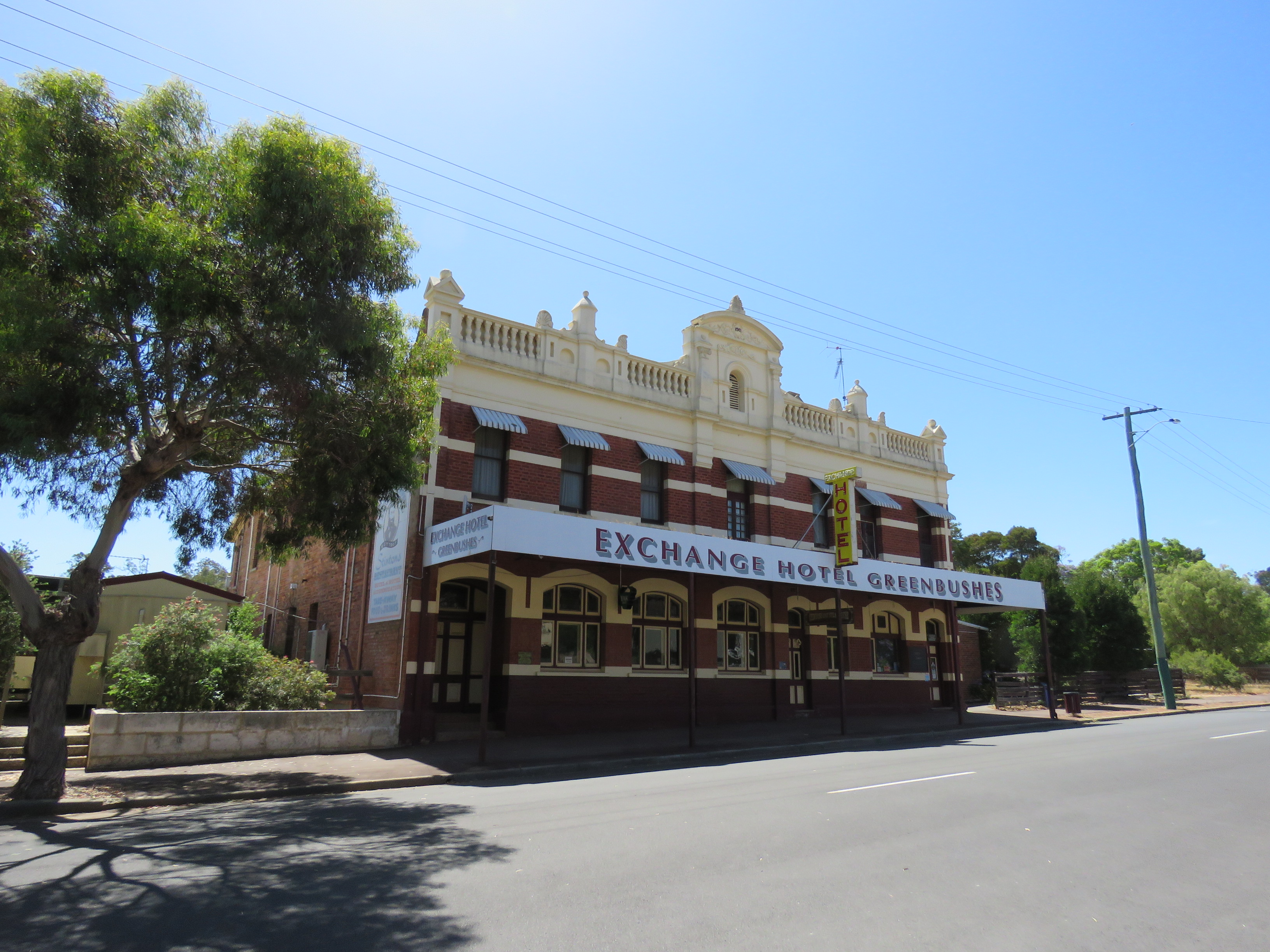
- The Exchange Hotel in January 2022

- Interactive map of Greenbushes
- Coordinates: 33.849°S 116.059°E
- Country: Australia
- State: Western Australia
- LGA: Shire of Bridgetown-Greenbushes
- Location: 250 km (160 mi) S of Perth
- Established: 1889

Government
  - State electorate: Warren-Blackwood
  - Federal division: O'Connor

Area
  - Total: 57.8 km^{2} (22.3 sq mi)

Population
  - Total: 361 (UCL 2021)
- Postcode: 6254

Greenbushes is a timber and mining town located in the South West region of Western Australia. The 2021 population was 365.

== History ==
Greenbushes was founded as a mining town in 1888 following a surveyor's discovery of tin in 1886. Greenbushes was named after the bright green Oxylobium lanceolatum that contrasted against the grey eucalyptus trees. The railway from Donnybrook to Bridgetown opened in 1898, (later extended as the Northcliffe railway line with Greenbushes station located approximately six kilometres north of the main townsite. The area surrounding the railway station was renamed North Greenbushes to reduce confusion.

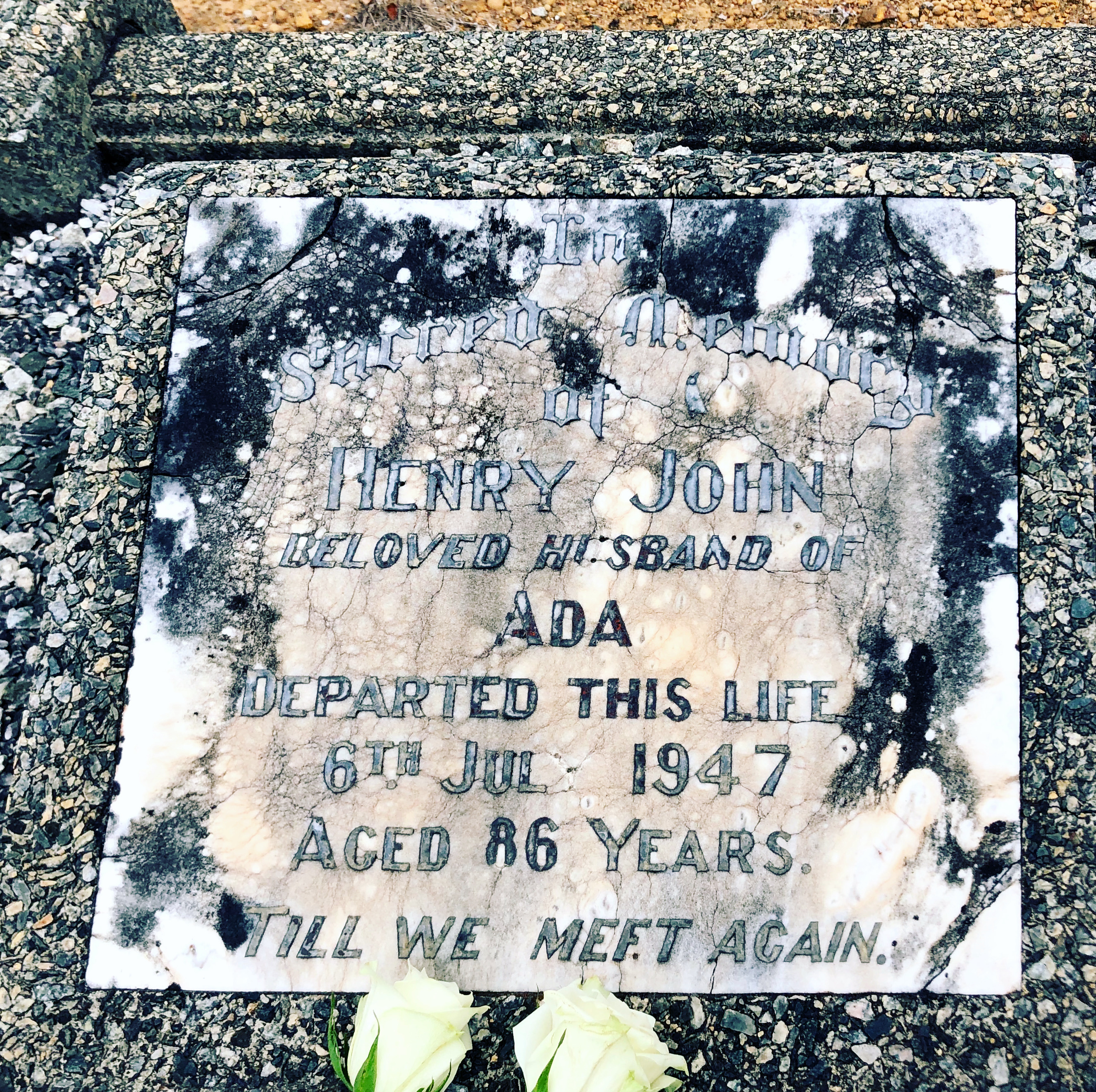
Henry John (Harry) Robinson born 1862 South Australia and Ada Robinson (nee Woodley) born 1871 in Western Australia

A separate town site of South Greenbushes, also known as Bunbury End began in 1896. The town had its own post office, hall and strong community until the 1930s when most moved to the main town site. The town boasted its own cricket team as well as many other groups.

The town experienced a period of economic boom until the international price of tin slumped in 1893, which caused the Greenbushes' industry to collapse. By 1913, approximately one quarter of Greenbushes' inhabitants were working in the timber industry, which was established shortly after the first mine.

== Industry ==
Greenbushes' two major industries are mining, producing tantalite concentrates, lithium minerals, tin metal and kaolin; and timber milling. Agriculture, viticulture, tourism and art galleries are also part of Greenbushes' industry.

The Greenbushes mine, located to the south of the town, has produced lithium concentrate since 1985. As of 2022, it is the largest lithium mine in the world.
