= Double Concerto (Balada) =

- A modern fantasy of two Mexican folk melodies
- by Leonardo Balada
- Composed: 2010
- Performed: July 8, 2011 - Querétaro
- Movements: 1
- Scoring: Orchestra

The Double Concerto for Oboe, Clarinet and Orchestra is a concerto for two soloists by Spanish composer Leonardo Balada. It was finished in 2010.

== Composition ==
Balada's compositional career took place mostly in the United States of America, as he has been teaching at Carnegie Mellon University in Pittsburgh, Pennsylvania, where he is University Professor of Composition. As a result of this, he has dedicated some of his compositional endeavors to American countries, such as his first symphony.

The Double Concerto was finished in 2010, and it features the composer's most recognizable trait: a fluctuation between his avant-garde style and folk music. In this case, he uses two very well known Mexican folk melodies. The concerto was commissioned by Rudy Weingartner and is dedicated to him, to Eleanor Weingartner, a clarinetist, and Miguel Salazar, an oboist. Balada also made a reduction for two soloists and piano in 2010. The premiere was given by all three dedicatees with the Orquesta Filarmónica del Estado de Querétaro on July 8, 2011. The concerto was published by Beteca Music.

== Structure ==
The concerto is only in one movement and has a total duration of about 18 minutes. It is scored for two trumpets, two horns, one trombone, a percussion section, a harp, a string section, a solo clarinet and a solo oboe.

== Recordings ==
The following is a list of notable recordings of this piece in chronological order:

- The Málaga Philharmonic recorded the piece under Edmon Colomer with soloists Emanuel Abbühl and Joan Enric Lluna for Naxos Records in 2012.
