= FMC Corporation =

American chemical manufacturing company

- Logo used since 1973

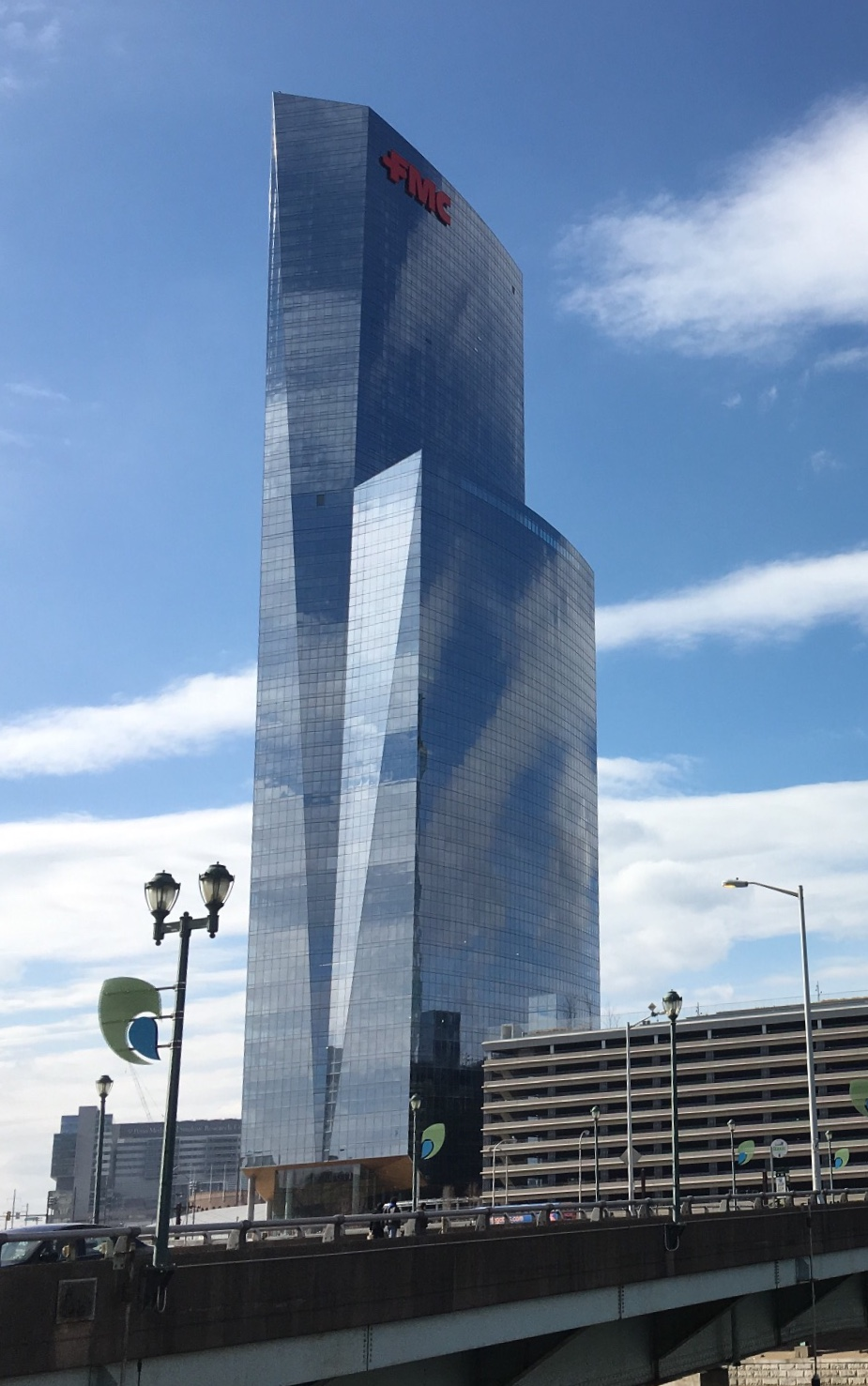
- Headquarters in Philadelphia
- Type: Public
- Traded as: NYSE: FMC; S&P 600 component
- Industry: Chemicals
- Founded: 1883; 143 years ago in Los Gatos, California, U.S.
- Founder: John Bean
- Headquarters: FMC Tower, Philadelphia, Pennsylvania, U.S.
- Area served: Worldwide
- Key people: Pierre R. Brondeau (chairman & CEO); Ronaldo Pereira (president); Andrew Sandifer (CFO)
- Revenue: ▼US$4.25 billion (2024)
- Operating income: ▼US$507 million (2024)
- Net income: ▼US$341 million (2024)
- Total assets: ▲US$11.7 billion (2024)
- Total equity: ▲US$4.49 billion (2024)
- Number of employees: 5,700 (2024)
- Website: fmc.com

FMC Corporation is an American chemical manufacturing company headquartered in Philadelphia, Pennsylvania, which originated as an insecticide producer in 1883 and later diversified into other industries. In 1941 at the beginning of U.S. direct involvement in WWII, the company received a contract to design and build amphibious tracked landing vehicles for the United States Department of War, and afterwards the company continued to diversify its products. FMC employs 7,000 people worldwide, and had gross revenues of US$4.7 billion in 2018.

== History ==
=== The Bean Spray Pump Company ===
Founded in 1883 as the Bean Spray Pump Company in Los Gatos, California, by chemist John Bean. The company's first product was a piston pump. Bean invented the pump to spray insecticide on the many fruit orchards in the area. A Bean sprayer was on display at the Forbes Mill museum in Los Gatos until its closure in 2014. Bean Avenue in downtown Los Gatos is named after John Bean.

=== FMC ===
In 1928, Bean Spray Pump purchased two companies: the Anderson-Barngrover Co. and Sprague-Sells Co. The Anderson-Barngrover Co. manufactured a sealed can rotary pressure sterilizer and the Sprague-Sells Co. manufactured canning machinery. At this time the company changed its name to Food Machinery Corporation, and began using the initials FMC. In 1948, the company name changed again, to Food Machinery & Chemical Corporation. In 1961, Food Machinery & Chemical Corporation was changed to simply FMC.

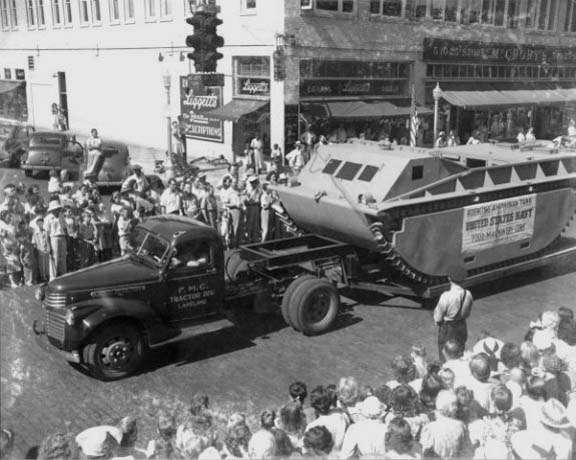
LVT-1 exhibited by manufacturer (FMC) in 1941 parade, Lakeland, Florida

FMC was awarded a contract to design and build amphibious tracked landing vehicles for the United States Department of War in 1941. FMC ranked 64th among United States corporations in the value of World War II military production contracts.

In 1961, the United States Navy's Bureau of Ships issued bids for a high performance amphibious ship-to-shore cargo carrier capable of moving over water at 35 knots (approx. 40 mph) and over ground at the same speed. It had to carry five tons of cargo across water, through the surf, across the beach, and inland. The vehicle also had to be quickly loaded and unloaded under combat conditions. FMC's Ordnance Division in San Jose, California built and tested two prototypes named "LVHX2 Landing Vehicle, Hydrofoil" for the United States Marine Corps. These were the first amphibious landing vehicles to make use of hydrofoils for high speed ship-to-shore operation. Although the LVHX2 never went into production, the Marine Corps used the prototypes in their continuous research and development program to develop better equipment for amphibious assault operations.

FMC later built the M113 Armored Personnel Carrier (APC), the Bradley Fighting Vehicle, and the XR311 at its former facility in Santa Clara, California. It also purchased the rights to manufacture some foreign military hardware, including the Brazilian EE-9 Cascavel, under license. Bean also manufactured firefighting equipment in the 1960s through the 1980s under the FMC and the Bean names.

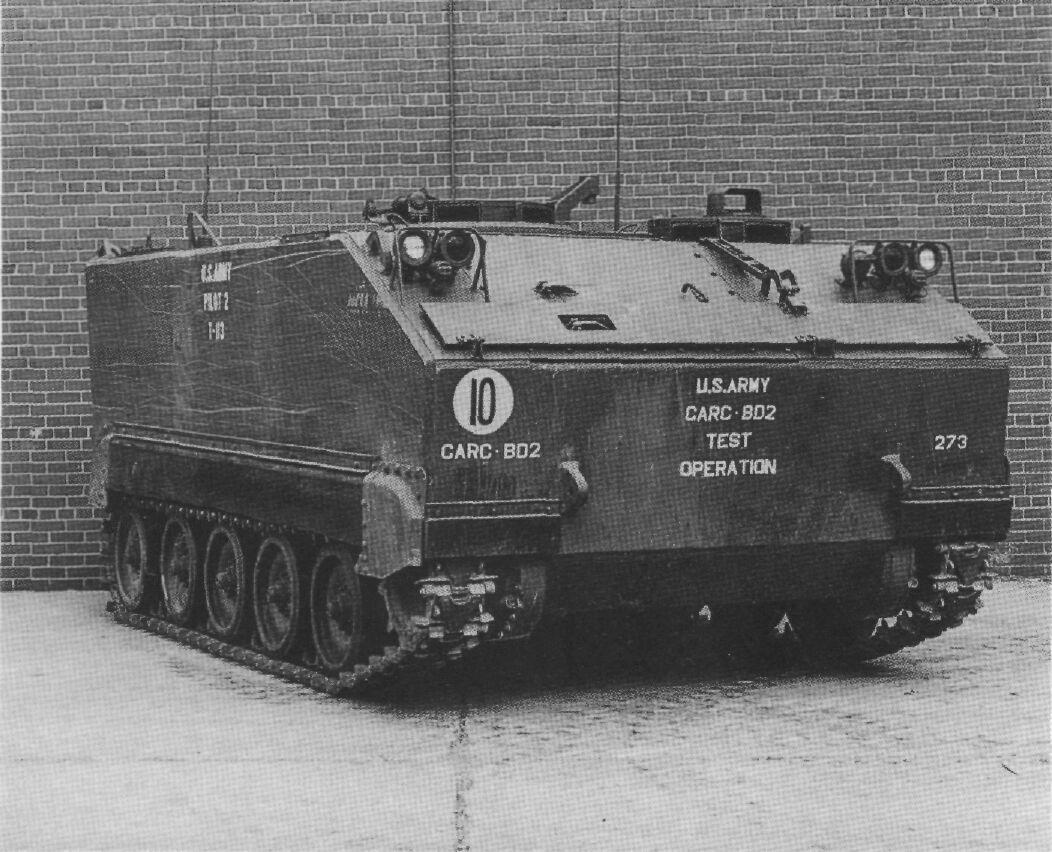
FMC T113 proposal

In 1967, FMC acquired Link-Belt.

In 1972, personnel were transferred from ordnance to designing and building recreational vehicles (motorcoaches). The oil crisis and high prices led production to end after five years.

FMC also produced fire truck fire pumps and pumper bodies. It had an original equipment manufacturer (OEM) arrangement with Ladder Towers Inc. (LTI) to market aerial ladders. In the early 1980s the firefighting apparatus division of FMC tried to expand its role in aerial ladders on fire trucks, leveraging the Link-Belt crane division. FMC's expansion into production of aerial ladders failed: the FMC Fire Apparatus division was shut down in 1990.

FMC sells chemical products used by beef and poultry processors to reduce pathogens, such as E. coli and salmonella, on uncooked beef and poultry. FMC obtained a patent on a method for sanitizing fowl that have been killed, plucked and eviscerated by contacting the fowl with an aqueous acid solution and maintaining that contact for a time sufficient to sanitize the fowl.

=== Spinoffs ===
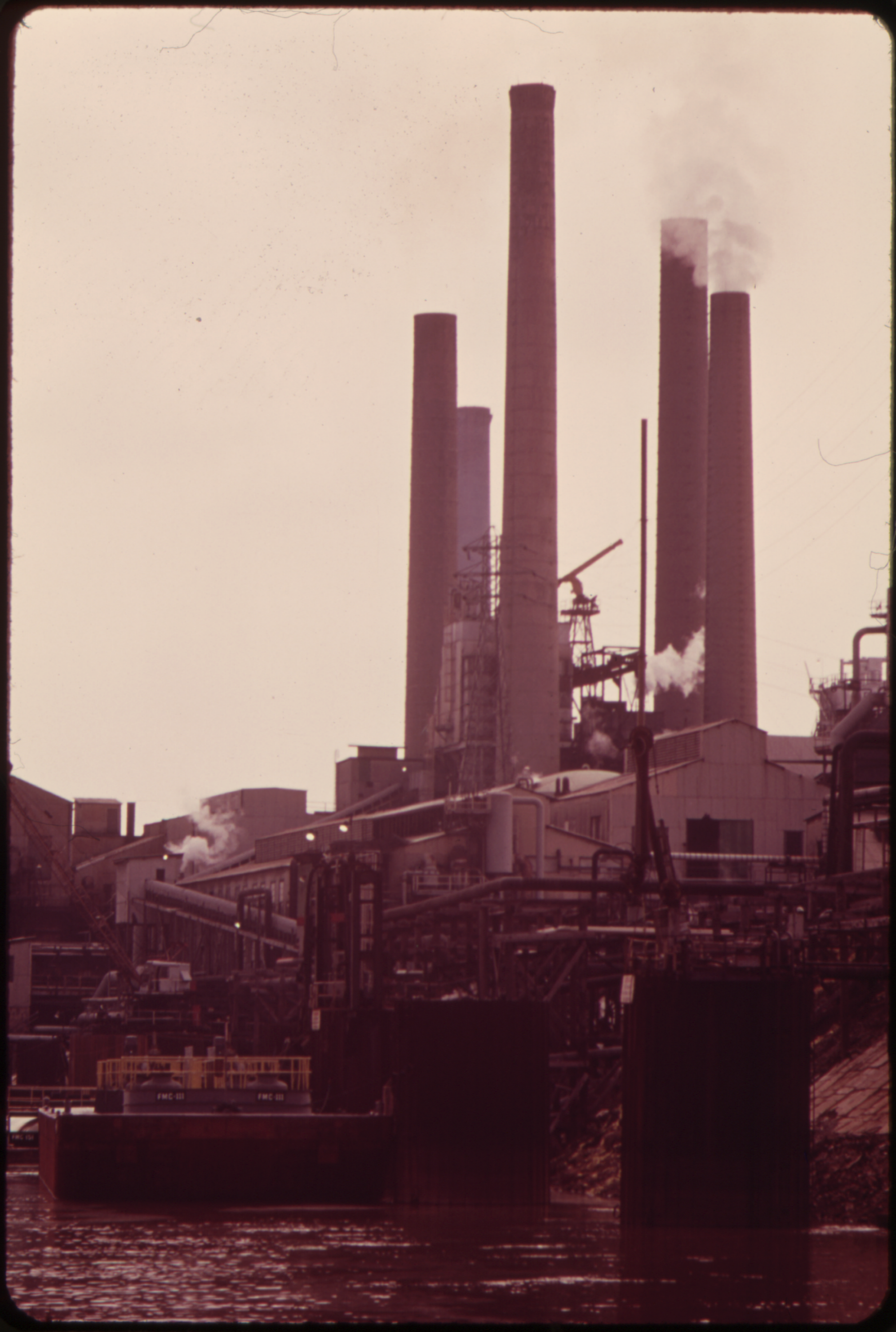
FMC plant in South Charleston, West Virginia, 1970

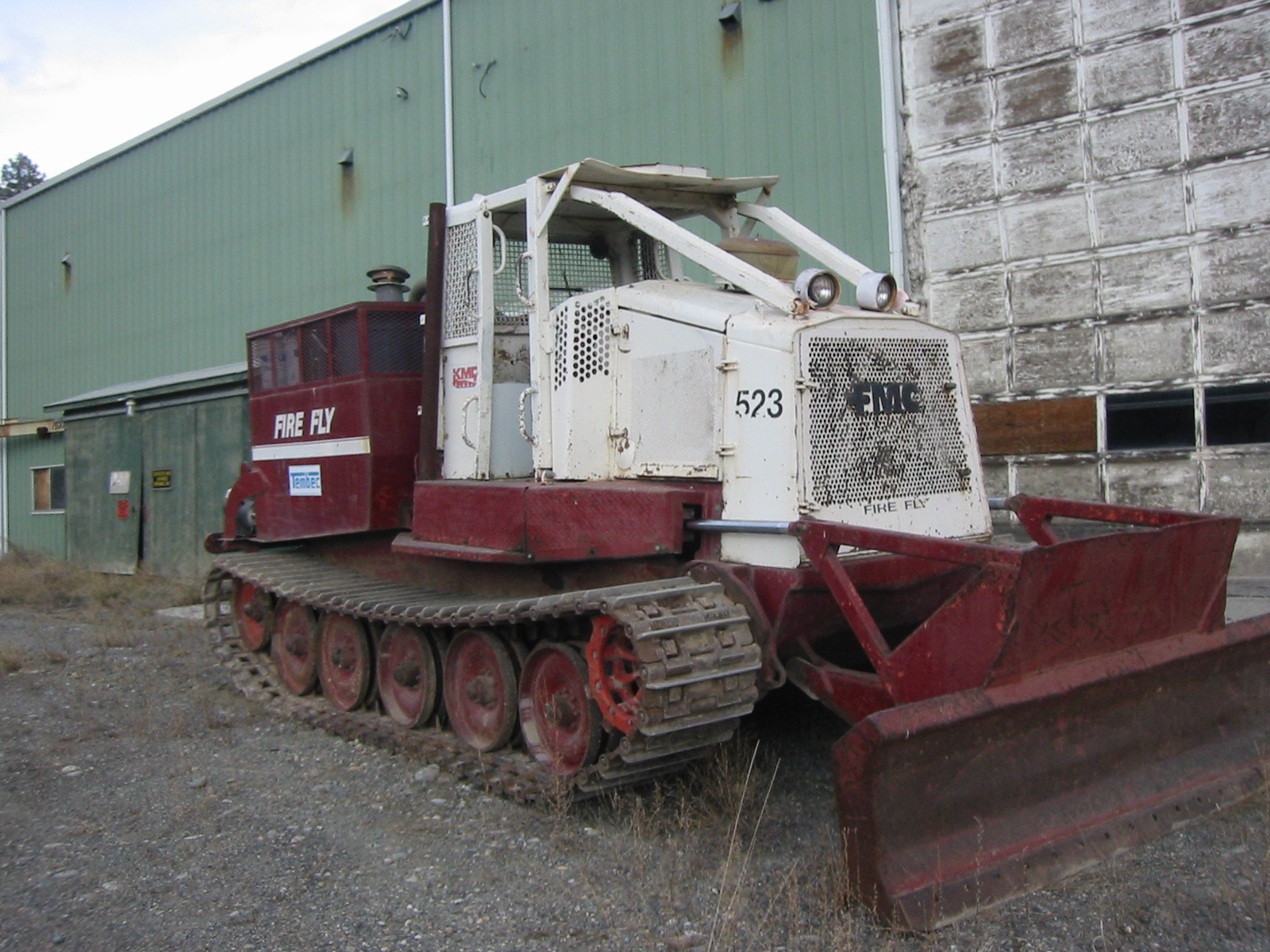
FMC 210 Skidder made by FMC

In 1946, FMC bought Bolens Lawn and Garden Equipment. FMC changed its name again in 1948, becoming Food Machinery and Chemical Corporation. In 1961 the name was changed to FMC Corporation.

In 1967, the FMC Corporation merged with the Link-Belt Company. The company produced FMC Link-Belt branded cranes and excavators. In 1986, the Link-Belt Construction Equipment Company was formed as a joint venture between FMC Corporation and Sumitomo Heavy Industries.

Between 1965 and 1985 FMC was the owner of the Gunderson metal works in Springfield, Oregon, during that period it was known as the "Marine and Rail Equipment Division of FMC" (MRED), it was sold in 1985 to The Greenbrier Companies.

FMC Gold

FMC Gold was formed in 1987 through a combination of FMC Corporation's North American Precious Metals interests. In June 1987, FMC Gold sold 11.4 percent of its shares to the public.

In May 1990, FMC Gold acquired all of the stock of Meridian Gold Company from a subsidiary of Burlington Resources, Inc., for 8 million shares FMC Gold common stock. The acquired net assets were recorded at $56.7 million based on the estimated market value of the shares issued. As a result of the stock issuance, FMC's ownership interest in FMC Gold was reduced to 79 percent from 89 percent. In 1994, the Company purchased additional shares of FMC Gold Company on the open market, bringing its ownership interest to 80 percent. The results of operations of the acquired properties are included in the consolidated financial statements of FMC Corporation effective after the acquisition date of May 15, 1990.

In May 1990, FMC Gold issued eight million new shares of stock to acquire Meridian Gold Company. FMC Corporation held the remaining 80% as of December 31, 1994. On January 10, 1990, FMC Corp. sold $75 million of 6 3/4% Exchangeable Senior Subordinated Debentures due 2005. The debentures were exchangeable into FMC Gold common stock held by FMC Corp. The lead underwriter was Morgan Stanley International. The debentures were not registered with the U.S. Securities and Exchange Commission "SEC".

In the 1980s, 1990s, and 2000s, FMC Corporation began spinning several of its divisions into separate companies, including United Defense and FMC Technologies, and selling its divisions, including its automotive division to Snap-on Equipment, a division of Snap-on, in 1996. Snap-on renamed the division the "John Bean Company". Bolens was sold to Troy-Bilt in 1988. FMC entered a partnership with Sumitomo Heavy Industries forming Link-Belt. FMC totally exited the partnership in 1998.

=== 21st century ===
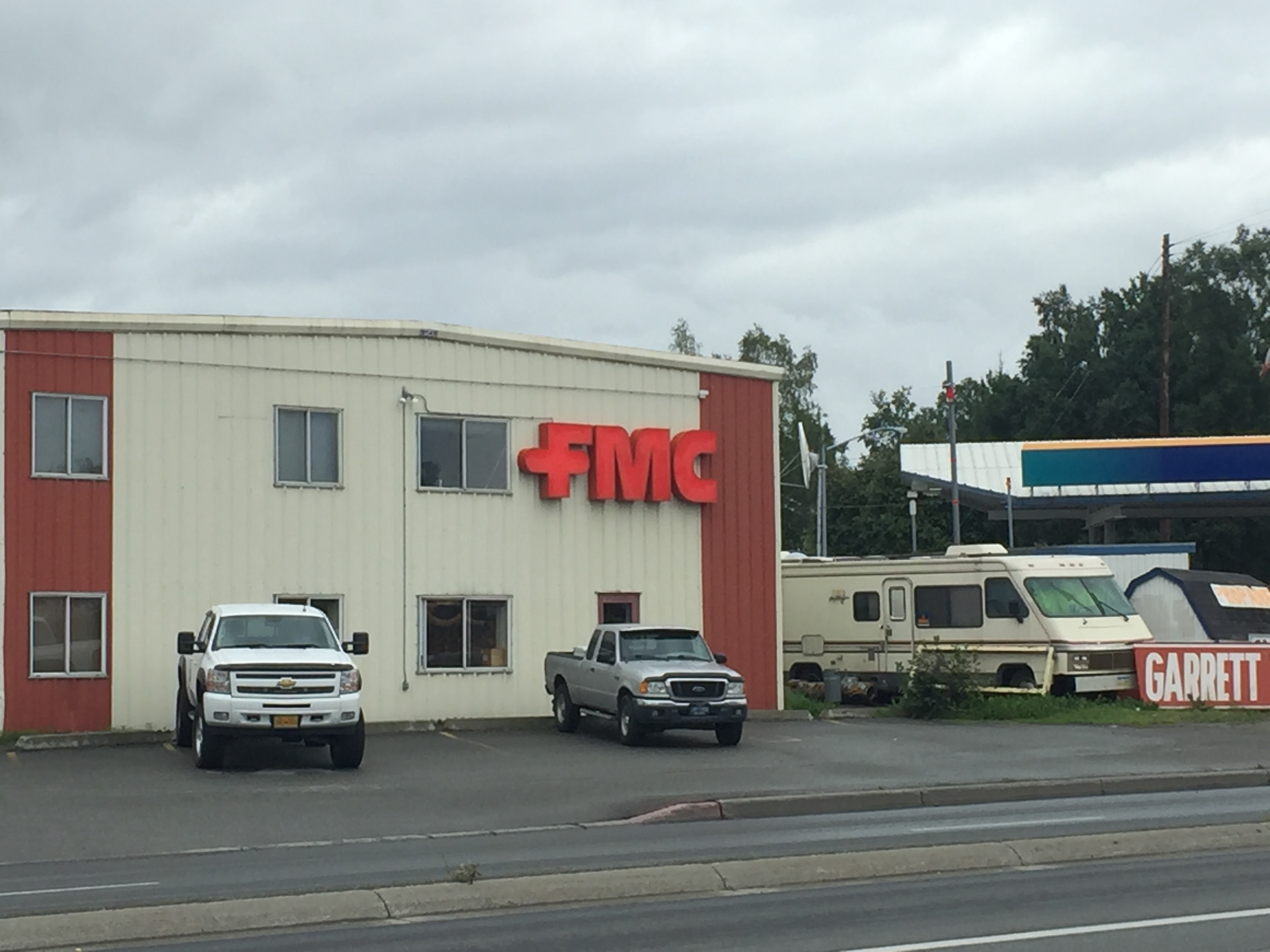
FMC in Anchorage, Alaska

- In 2001, FMC spun off its energy, airport, and food equipment businesses into a separate company named FMC Technologies.
- In 2006 FMC Corporation celebrated 75 years being listed on the New York Stock Exchange.
- Pierre Brondeau was named president and chief executive officer succeeding William G. Walter, effective January 1, 2010. Brondeau had been with Dow Chemical and prior to that Rohm & Haas.
- A former FMC site in San Jose, California is the location for PayPal Park, a new soccer stadium for the San Jose Earthquakes.
- In 2014, FMC announced their acquisition of Cheminova, a multinational crop protection company, which aligns with the company's corporate strategy to focus its portfolio on agriculture, health and nutrition end markets, and lithium technologies. In 2015, FMC completed the sale of its Alkali Chemicals business to Tronox.
- In 2017 FMC entered into an agreement with Dupont following the antitrust order for the latter to divest part of its portfolio of sulfonylureas herbicides in the Dow–Dupont merger.
- In 2019 FMC spun off Livent (originally Lithium Corporation of America, later to merge with Allkem to form Arcadium Lithium.) to shareholders.

=== FMC Technologies ===
FMC Technologies was an American company that produced equipment for exploration and production of hydrocarbons. FMC Technologies was incorporated in 2000 when FMC Corporation divested its machinery businesses. It exists today as a part of TechnipFMC, after a merger with Technip in 2017.

=== JBT Corporation ===
JBT Corporation is an American food processing machinery and airport equipment company. JBT Corporation was incorporated in 2008 when FMC Technologies divested its non-energy businesses.

== Controversies ==
=== Superfund sites ===
==== Idaho ====
FMC Corporation operated a phosphate mine and plant in Idaho on the Fort Hall Indian Reservation of the federally recognized Shoshone-Bannock Tribes. Between 1949 and 2001, it produced an estimated 250 million pounds of elemental phosphorus annually. In 1989, as part of what is termed the Eastern Michaud Flats Contamination, its 1500-acre plant site was designated by EPA under the Comprehensive Environmental Response, Compensation, and Liability Act of 1980 (CERCLA) as a superfund site because of water and land pollution caused by these operations. After working to improve operations and air quality, the company eventually deactivated operations and abandoned the plant and related mine in 2001. Seventeen mines in the area have been designated as superfund sites because of selenium poisoning.

==== Minnesota ====
FMC Corporation operated a plant in Fridley Minnesota several hundred feet east of the Mississippi river from the 1940s until 1969 where it disposed of waste such as solvents, paint sludge, and plating wastes in an on-site dump. In the early 1980s, contamination from the on-site dump contaminated the Mississippi River, and nearby drinking water for the city of Minneapolis.

==== Washington State ====
FMC Corporation operated a pesticide formulation plant from 1951 until 1986 in Yakima, Washington. From 1952 to 1969, FMC disposed of agricultural pesticides in a pit on site. In 1983 the site was listed in the EPA Superfund list, after groundwater and soil was found to be contaminated with pesticides. After an EPA order, FMC was forced to dispose of 850 tons of contaminated soil between 1988 and 1989. In 1990, EPA required FMC to incinerate soils on-site.

==== New York State ====
At its Dublin Road Site, located in north-western New York in Orleans County, FMC Corporation from 1933 to 1968 disposed of coal ash cinders, laboratory wastes consisting of glass bottles and chemical residues, residues from lime sulfur filtration, building debris and residues from pesticide production areas. These materials contained metals in the form of salts and pesticides/insecticides.

=== African lion program ===
In 2009, CBS 60 Minutes ran an exposé on the use by farmers in Kenya of an FMC-produced pesticide, Furadan, as a poison to kill African lions. The piece suggested that Furadan was a serious threat to the future of the lion population in Africa. FMC has commented extensively on this issue through the media and their websites, including furadanfacts.com. They engaged with government officials, non-governmental organizations, and others to try and resolve the illegal use of their pesticides to kill wildlife. The company took action to stop the sale of this product and instituted a buy-back program in East Africa when it determined that the illegal and intentional misuse of chemicals against wildlife could not be controlled by education or stewardship programs alone.

== In popular culture ==
- The development of the M2 Bradley vehicle was satirized in the 1998 HBO movie The Pentagon Wars. In the movie FMC was fictionalized as A.O.C. Corporation.

== Gallery ==
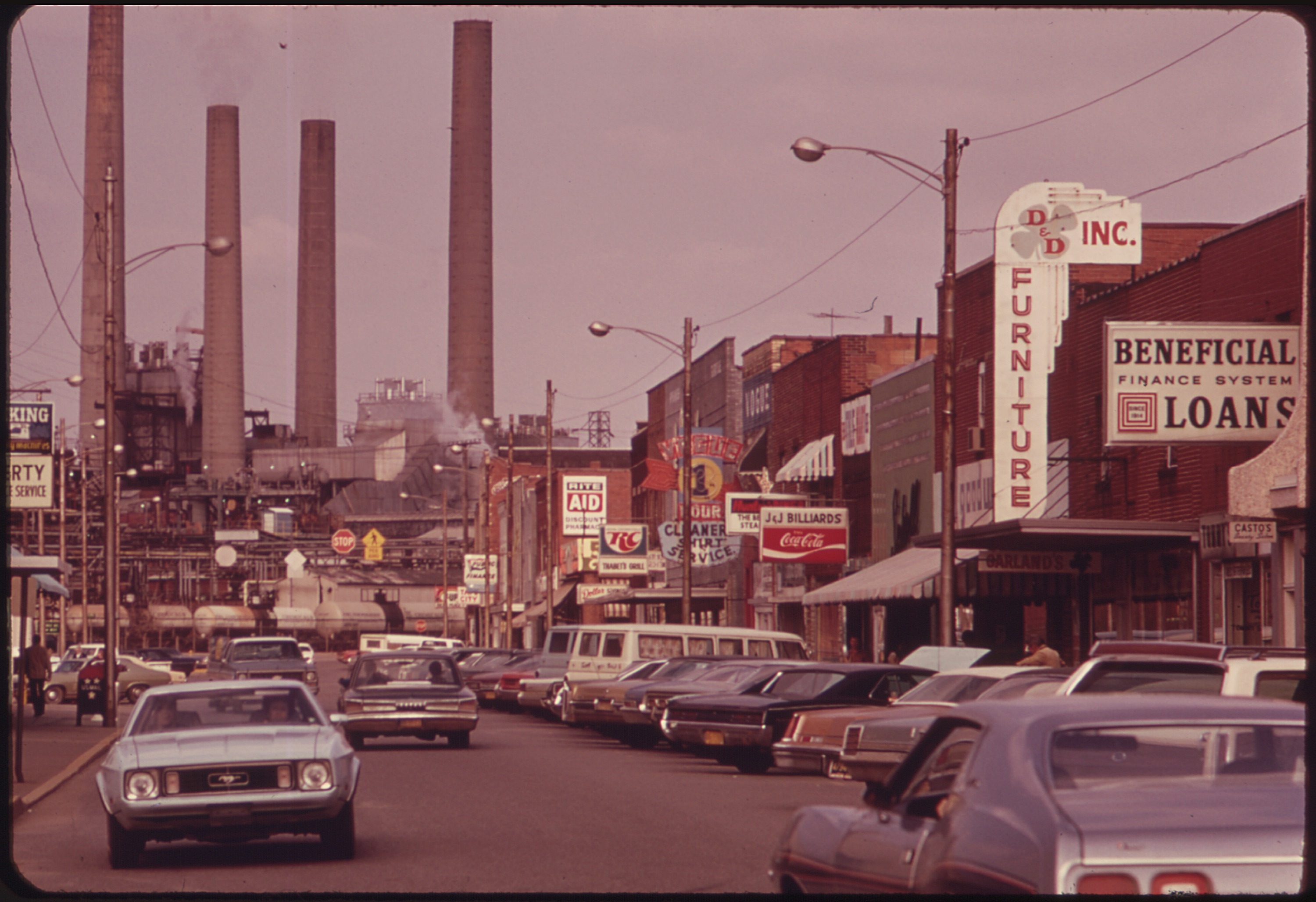
7th Avenue looking NE, South Charleston, in 1973

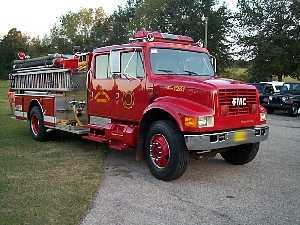
Chaires Engine 12-61 International FMC

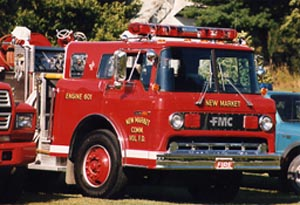
1991 Ford FMC, New Market Community Volunteer Fire Department & SW Rescue

== See also ==
- American Viscose Corporation
- List of largest chemical producers
