= Symphony No. 1 (Balada) =

Composition by Lenoardo Balada in 1968

- Sinfonía en negro: Homage to Martin Luther King
- by Leonardo Balada
- Native name: Sinfonía en negro: Homenaje a Martin Luther King
- Composed: 1968
- Performed: June 21, 1969 - Madrid
- Movements: 4
- Scoring: Orchestra

The Symphony No. 1 by Spanish composer Leonardo Balada was composed in 1968. It is often subtitled Sinfonía en negro: Homage to Martin Luther King.

== Composition ==
Balada grew up in Barcelona in a liberal family under Francisco Franco's regime. As he recalls, being raised to respect freedom of expression and equality caused him to admire post-World War II United States. However, the mistreatment of African Americans felt like a disappointment to him. After moving to the United States, he came in contact with the Civil Rights Movement, a relationship which culminated with Balada meeting Martin Luther King Jr. in New York City in 1967, one year before King was assassinated.

In 1968, Balada received a commission by Spain's RTVE Symphony Orchestra to compose a work scored for them. Balada decided to use King as the subject for the symphony. As he did with his Symphony No. 6, Guernica and No-res, he used his own ideology as the unifying thread for the work. The symphony was finished in 1968 and was premiered at the Teatro Real in Madrid on June 21, 1969, with the RTVE Symphony Orchestra under Enrique García Asensio. From then, the symphony was taken to the United States, where it was performed in Carnegie Hall and other important venues. However, since people started to become uninterested in modern music around the 70s, the symphony, which was an example of early modernism, has lost popularity. The symphony is dedicated to Enrique Franco, a fellow Spanish composer.

== Structure ==
The symphony is divided into four attacca movements and has a total duration of 22 minutes. The movement list is as follows:

1. Oppression
2. Chains
3. Vision
4. Triumph

The composition describes the journey of black people in the Americas from slavery to freedom. It is scored for two flutes, two oboes, two clarinets, two bassoons, two horns, three trumpets, two trombones, one tuba, a large percussion section, including actual chains, one piano and a large string section.

== Recordings ==
The following is a list of notable recordings of this piece in chronological order:

- The RTVE Symphony Orchestra recorded the piece under Enrique García Asensio for Albany Records in 2001.
- The Málaga Philharmonic recorded the piece under Edmon Colomer for Naxos Records in 2012.
