= Arcadium Lithium =

Specialty chemicals company

Arcadium Lithium plc
- Company type: Subsidiary
- Traded as: NYSE: ALTM; ASX: LTM
- Industry: Chemical industry
- Founded: 2024
- Defunct: March 6, 2025
- Fate: Acquired by Rio Tinto
- Headquarters: United States
- Products: Lithium, lithium products
- Website: www.arcadiumlithium.com

Arcadium Lithium plc was a specialty chemicals manufacturing company focused on lithium production. It was formed in January 2024 from the merger of Livent, an American special chemicals company, and Allkem, an Australian lithium mining company. The new company, Arcadium Lithium, became the world's third-largest lithium producer. It was cross-listed in both the New York Stock Exchange and the Australian Securities Exchange. In 2025, Rio Tinto completed its purchase of Arcadium Lithium for $6.7 billion, turning it into its lithium unit, Rio Tinto Lithium.

== History ==
Arcadium Lithium plc was created in January 2024 with the merger of Livent and Allkem. Livent's origins traced back to 1944, when the Lithium Corporation of America was created. In May 1985, it was acquired by the FMC Corporation. Livent was created in 2018, when FMC spun off its lithium division. Allkem was originally known as Orocobre Limited, and was listed on the Australian Securities Exchange in December 2007. After merging with Galaxy Resources in 2021, Orocobre was rebranded as Allkem.

In September 2024, Arcadium announced it would place its Mt Cattlin mine into care and maintenance by mid-2025 due to low spodumene prices. In August, Arcadium acquired Li-Metal Corp's lithium metal production business for US$11 million, gaining its intellectual property on refining lithium carbonate and a pilot lithium refinery.

On October 9, 2024, Rio Tinto agreed to buy Arcadium for US$6.7 billion, in an all-cash deal for US$5.85 per each Arcadium Lithium share. The deal was unanimously approved by the boards of both companies. The deal was completed on March 6, 2025, with Arcadium Lithium becoming Rio Tinto's lithium unit, called Rio Tinto Lithium.
