= Columbus: Images for Orchestra =

1991 composition by Leonardo Balada

- by Leonardo Balada
- Native name: Colón: Imágenes para orquesta
- Form: Suite
- Composed: 1991
- Performed: January 22, 1992 - Madrid
- Movements: 4
- Scoring: Orchestra

Columbus: Images for Orchestra (Spanish: Colón: Imágenes para orquesta) is a composition by Spanish composer Leonardo Balada. It was finished in 1991 and uses material from Balada's opera Christopher Columbus.

== Composition ==
Often categorized as a suite, Balada's Columbus is, according to the composer himself, a "free synthesis of four scenes from the opera Christopher Columbus", which was completed in 1989 and was premiered at the Gran Teatre del Liceu in Barcelona in the year 1989, José Carreras and Montserrat Caballé having the most prominent roles. Some years later, in 1991, Balada decided to write an abridged version of some scenes in the opera, that means, using the original material freely for concert performance. The abridged version was also premiered on January 22, 1992 in Madrid by the RTVE Symphony Orchestra conducted by Sergiu Comissiona and was subsequently recorded by Albany Records. The American premiere was given by the Hartford Symphony Orchestra under the baton of Michael Lankester.

== Structure ==
This work is divided into four movements corresponding with four different arias in the opera and has a total duration of 22 minutes. The movement titles are extracted either from the incipit of the numbers or from the titles themselves from the original opera. The movement list is as follows:

1. En el puerto de Palos (The Port of Palos)
2. ¡Almirante! ¡Almirante! (Admiral! Admiral!)
3. ¿En dónde está la voluntad de Dios? (Where is the Will of God?)
4. Amanecer en las Indias (Dawn in the Indies)

The port of Palos de la Frontera is a clear reference to the site from which Columbus departed towards the Indies. The suite is scored for two flutes, two oboes, two clarinets, two bassoons, three horns, three trumpets, three trombones, one tuba, a large percussion section, a harp, a harpsichord and a large string section.

== Recordings ==
The following is a list of notable recordings of this piece in chronological order:

- The RTVE Symphony Orchestra recorded the piece under Sergiu Comissiona for Albany Records in 1992.
- The Málaga Philharmonic recorded the piece under Edmon Colomer for Naxos Records in 2012.
