= Technip Energies =

French engineering and technology company

Technip Energies NV
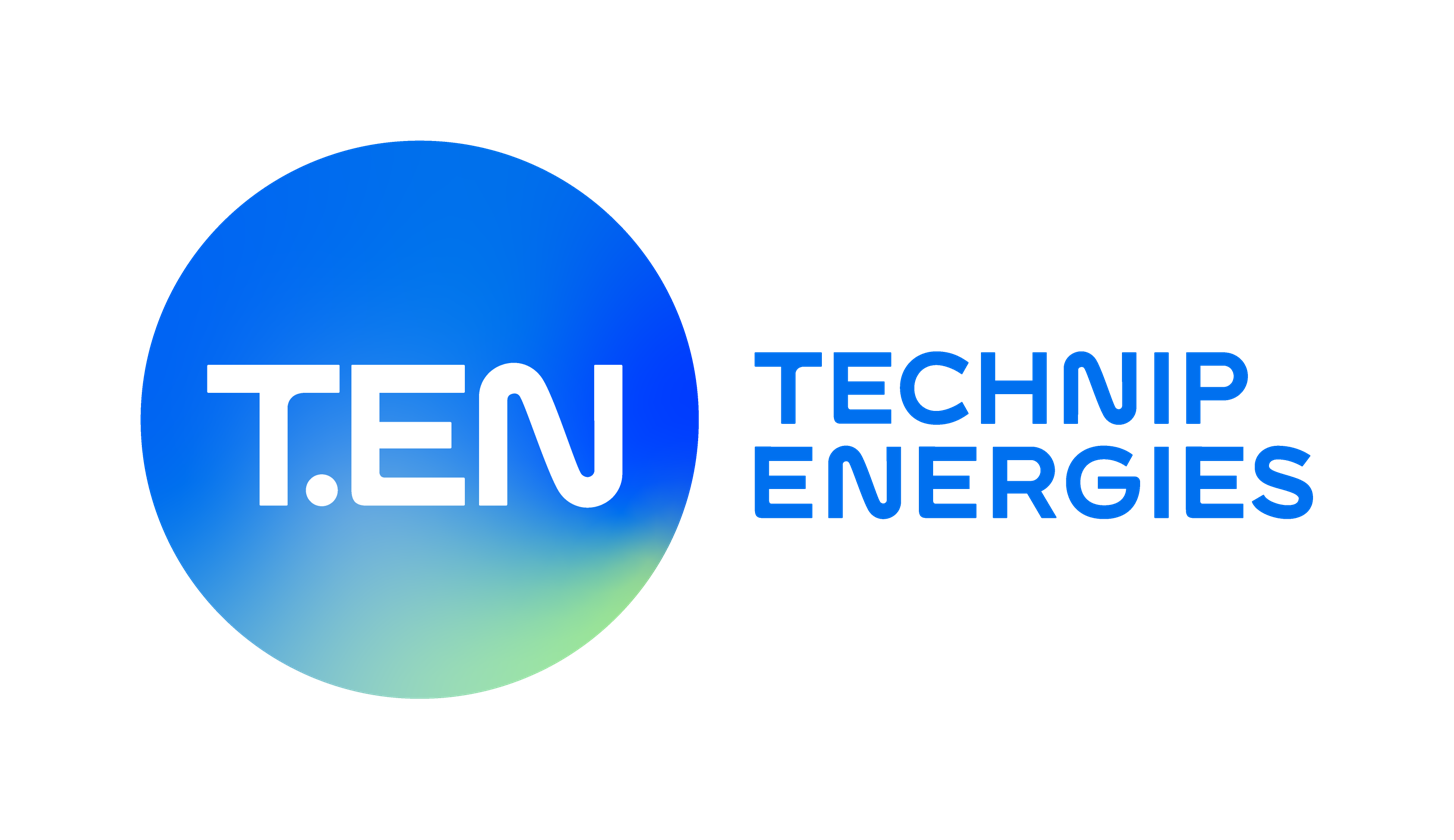
- Type: Public (NV)
- Traded as: Euronext Paris: TE; CAC Next 20
- Industry: Energy services
- Founded: 12 February 2021; 5 years ago
- Headquarters: La Défense, Nanterre, France
- Key people: Joseph Rinaldi (Chairman); Arnaud Pieton (CEO)
- Products: Project, technology, engineering and construction management for the energy industry
- Revenue: €6.9 billion (2024)
- Net income: €390 million (2024)
- Number of employees: 17,000 (2024)
- Website: www.ten.com

Technip Energies NV is a French engineering and technology company for the energy industry and chemicals sector.

It is a spin-off of TechnipFMC but Technip Energies and TechnipFMC are now two independent companies with no capital ties.

== History ==
Technip Energies was established in 2021 as a spinoff of multinational energy company TechnipFMC, itself the result of a merger between French group Technip and American company FMC Technologies.

In August 2019, TechnipFMC CEO Doug Pferdehirt announced that TechnipFMC would be split into two independent engineering companies: a dedicated technology and services company, to retain the TechnipFMC name, and an engineering and construction business renamed Technip Energies.

In January 2021, Technip Energies CEO Arnaud Piéton announced plans for an initial public offering and committed to demonstrate to shareholders that the organization could operate independently of TechnipFMC. The TechnipFMC split became effective the following month. The spinoff was completed on 12 February 2021.

== Activities ==
Technip Energies largely focuses on design and construction of large-scale projects to liquify and ship natural gas, as well as refinery bio-conversion projects, carbon capture, and hydrogen.

Gas, especially liquefied natural gas (LNG), provides over 60% of Technip Energies’ turnover, while refining and petrochemicals together provide 25-30%. Technip Energies is the world leader in the construction of LNG factories. Technip Energies is also a world leader in hydrogen, having participated in the construction of 30% of the currently installed production capacities.

In 2025, the company operated in 34 countries with 17,000 employees.

Technip Energies has been the main contractor on the Yamal LNG development, a US$27 billion project designed to ship LNG to Asian markets through the Northeast Passage. In March 2022, Technip Energies renounced new business opportunities in Russia following its invasion of Ukraine. In April 2022, the European Union's fifth package of sanctions against Russia barred the delivery of goods and technologies required for gas liquefaction, putting a pause on Technip Energies' Arctic LNG 2 liquefied natural gas project. In October 2022, Arnaud Pieton announced having signed an Exit Framework Agreement for this project and anticipated completing this process within the first half of 2023.

In February 2021, QatarEnergy awarded a $13 billion contract to Technip Energies and its Japanese partner Chiyoda. The project involves the construction of four natural gas liquefaction plants in Qatar to increase the country's liquefied natural gas production by 40%. The contract sent Technip Energies stock price soaring on its first day of trading, associating it with the largest LNG project in history.

In 2021, Technip Energies supplied the world's first liquefied CO_{2} marine loading arms as part of the Northern Lights carbon capture project in Norway. In July 2022, Hafslund Oslo Celsio awarded Technip Energies a contract for the world's first complete waste-to-energy facility with CO_{2} capture.

In 2022, Technip Energies collaborated with the Swiss sports brand On to develop the first ever shoe made using carbon emissions as a primary raw material.

In July 2022, Technip Energies signed an agreement with the UAE's National Petroleum Construction Co. (NPCC) to form the joint venture NT ENERGIES LLC, which aims to support the energy transition in the Middle East and North Africa by offering services related to decarbonization and blue and green hydrogen.

In 2023 Technip Energies was awarded two Engineering, Procurement Services and Construction Management (EPCM) contracts by Galp for the development of their Sines refinery in Portugal. The primary focuses of the contracts are the installation of a 270 ktpa capacity advanced bio-fuels unit, in a joint venture partnership with Galp holding 75% and Mitsui holding 25%, and a 100 MW proton exchange membrane (PEM) electrolysis plant with a production up to 15 ktpa of renewable hydrogen, to replace up to 20% of the refinery's grey hydrogen consumption. Both initiatives have been undertaken as part of Galp's program to reduce the carbon footprint of the refinery and its products, with a total gross investment of €650 million.

In the same year, Technip Energies, entered into several collaborations including a partnership with Belgian engineering company John Cockerill, to develop Rely – a provider of hydrogen; and a partnership with LanzaJet to expand its sustainable aviation fuel production with the use of Technip Energies' Hummingbird Technology.

In November 2023, Technip Energies created a company specializing in the recycling of polyethylene terephthalate found in textiles (textile regeneration), Reju.

In June 2024, it concluded a contract worth over €1 billion in the liquefied natural gas sector with Adnoc to design and develop two liquefaction trains for the low-carbon LNG project in Ruwais, Abu Dhabi.

In November 2024, during its Capital Markets Day, Technip Energies presented its 2025–2028 strategy, reporting a sales pipeline of €75 billion and available financial capacity exceeding €1 billion.

In December 2024, Technip Energies receives the green light to start construction of the NZT Power (a joint venture owned by BP and Equinor) carbon capture gas power plant in Teesside, UK, another contract worth over €1 billion, which is set to become the first gas-fired power plant equipped with a carbon capture and storage system.

In April 2025, Technip Energies was awarded a $1 billion contract to supply a blue ammonia (low-carbon) plant to Blue Point Number One, a joint venture owned by CF Industries (US), JERA, and Mitsui (Japan) in Donaldsonville, Louisiana, which is expected to produce 1.4 million tons per year. The ammonia produced will be used in several ways by customers: CF Industries will use it to manufacture fertilizers, while JERA will use it as a co-fuel with coal to reduce coal emissions.

In September 2025, Technip Energies bought Ecovyst's Advanced Materials & Catalysts business for $556 million.

Technip Energies was part of the consortium which launched the Alliance for Industry Decarbonization, which aims to decarbonize industrial value chains towards the Paris Agreement goals.

Technip Energies is a member of OPEN-C Foundation, a foundation dedicated to floating wind power and marine renewable energies.

Technip Energies is listed on the Euronext Paris stock market with symbol TE.

== Controversies ==
According to the French newspaper Le Monde, Technip Energies participated in the Russian project Arctic LNG 2 after the sanctions imposed by the European Union against Russia. Le Monde writes "European sanctions against Russia should have prohibited any Western involvement in such a project." and alleges that Technip Energies circumvented the sanctions to avoid heavy loses and penalties after having spent millions of work hours in the project. Technip Energies exited the project on July 27, 2023, over a year later after the European Union imposed the sanctions. Technip Energies affirms that it complied with all applicable sanctions.
