= Leonardo Balada =

American classical composer

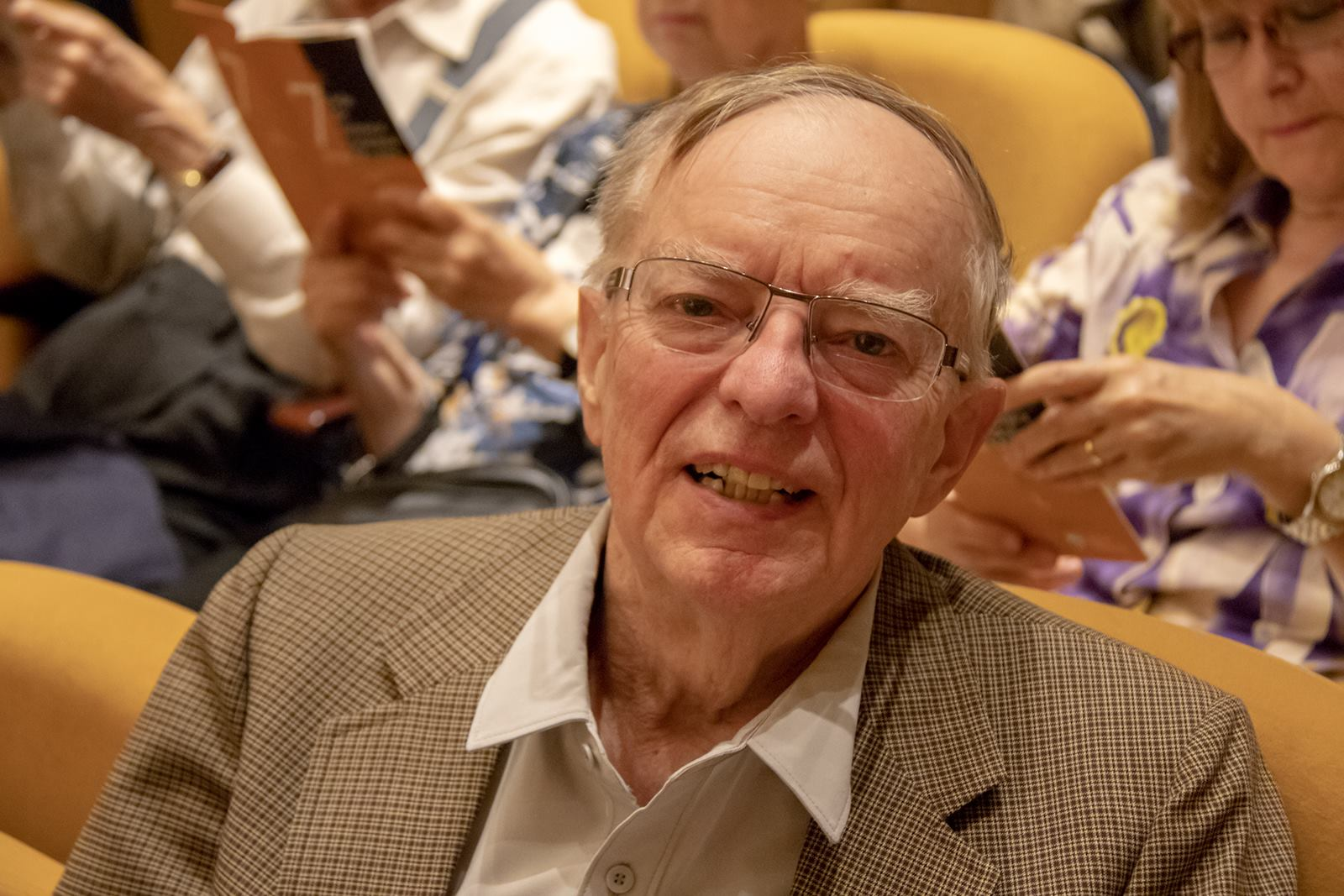
Lleonard Balada at a concert at the Ateneu Barcelonès on June 3, 2018

Leonardo Balada Ibáñez (born September 22, 1933) is a Spanish-American classical composer, who is noted for his operas and orchestral works.

== Life ==
Balada was born in Barcelona, Spain. After studying piano at the Conservatori Superior de Música del Liceu in Barcelona, Balada emigrated to the United States in 1956 to study at the New York College of Music on scholarship. He left that institution for the Juilliard School in New York, from which he graduated in 1960. He studied composition with Vincent Persichetti, Alexandre Tansman and Aaron Copland, and conducting with Igor Markevitch. In 1981, he became a naturalized citizen of the United States. He taught at Carnegie Mellon University in Pittsburgh, Pennsylvania starting in 1970, and retired in 2020.

Balada's notable students include John Zorn (who studied with him at the United Nations International School), Hankus Netsky and Victor Padilla.

He has taught 10 courses on musical composition at the Universitat Politècnica de València in Spain from the year 2010 to the year 2020, in which the prize has been the premiere of the musical work. Some of the awarded composers are Victor Padilla, Pedro Astasio, and Antonio Manuel Martínez Heredia.

== Music ==
Balada's works from the early 1960s display some of the characteristics of neoclassicism, but he was ultimately dissatisfied with this technique, and in 1966 began to move towards a more avant-garde style, producing works such as Guernica. Balada felt a need for a change again in 1975, his work from then onward being characterized by the combination of folk dance rhythms with the avant-garde techniques of the previous period. Harmonically, Balada's mature period work displays a combination of the tonality of folk music with atonality. Compositions representative of this period include Homage to Sarasate and Homage to Casals. No matter the stylistic phase, Balada's music features extensive rhythmic variance and unique orchestration, often in service of a haunting atmosphere.

Some of Balada's works have been recorded by Naxos Records.

== Works ==
=== Opera ===
- Hangman, Hangman!, chamber opera (1982)
- Zapata, opera (1984)
- Christopher Columbus, opera (1986)
- Death of Columbus, opera (1996)
- The Town of Greed, chamber opera (1997) (sequel to Hangman, Hangman!)
- Faust-bal, opera (2007)
- Resurrection of Columbus, opera (2013)

=== Orchestral ===
- Symphonies
  - Symphony No. 1 Sinfonia en Negro, a homage to Martin Luther King (1968)
  - Symphony No. 2 Cumbres, a short symphony for band (1972)
  - Symphony No. 3 Steel Symphony (1972)
  - Symphony No. 4 Lausanne (1992)
  - Symphony No. 5 American (2003)
  - Symphony No. 6 Symphony of Sorrows (2005)
- Guernica (1966)
- Homage to Sarasate (1975)
- Homage to Casals (1975)
- Sardana (1979)
- Quasi un Pasodoble (1981)
- Fantasias Sonoras (1987)
- Zapata: Images for Orchestra (1987)
- Columbus: Images for Orchestra (1991)
- Divertimentos, for string orchestra (1991)
- Celebracio (1992)
- Folk Dreams (1994-8)
- Passacaglia (2002)
- Prague Sinfonietta (2003)

=== Concertante ===
Piano

- Piano Concerto No. 1 (1964)
- Piano Concerto No. 2 for piano, winds, and percussion (1974)
- Piano Concerto No. 3 (1999)

Violin

- Violin Concerto No. 1 (1982)
- Caprichos No. 2 (2004)
- Caprichos No. 3 (2005)

Viola

- Viola Concerto for viola and wind ensemble (2009–2010)

Cello

- Cello Concerto No. 1 for cello and nine players (1962)
- Cello Concerto No. 2 New Orleans (2001)
- Concerto for Three Cellos and Orchestra A German Concerto (2006)

Flute

- Morning Music for flute and orchestra (1994)
- Music for Flute and Orchestra (2000)

Clarinet

- Caprichos No. 7 (2009), Composed for and dedicated to Grup21; Peter Bacchus, artistic director - for clarinet and instrumental ensemble.

Guitar

- Guitar Concerto No. 1 (1965)
- Sinfonia Concertante for Guitar and Orchestra Persistencies (1974)
- Concerto for Four Guitars and Orchestra (1976)
- Concierto Mágico for guitar and orchestra (1997)
- Caprichos No. 1 (2003)

Others

- Concerto for Bandoneon and Orchestra (1970)
- Concertino for Castanets and Orchestra Three Anecdotes (1977)
- Music for Oboe and Orchestra Lament from the Cradle of the Earth (1993)
- Double Concerto for Oboe, Clarinet and Orchestra (2010)

=== Vocal/choral ===
- Maria Sabina (1969)
- La Moradas (1970)
- No-res (1974)
- Ponce de Leon, for narrator and orchestra (1974)
- Torquemada (1980)
- Thunderous Scenes (1992)
- Dionisio: In Memoriam (2001)
- Ebony Fantasies, cantata (2003)
