= Peter Bacchus =

British investment banker

Peter Bacchus is an investment banker and founder of Bacchus Capital Advisers (“BCA”), with experience in M&A and corporate defence, particularly within the mining and natural resources sectors. He is currently the Chairman and Chief Executive of BCA, an investment and merchant banking firm headquartered in London, UK, with operations in Canada and Australia.

Bacchus serves as a Non-Executive Director of Gold Fields, an international gold producer, and Apex Royalties, a mining royalty company. Bacchus is also a Director of BCA’s venture companies, including BG Gold, 308 Services, and Green 14. Bacchus founded Yellow Cake plc, which holds physical uranium and is listed on the London Stock Exchange.

== Career ==
=== Early career ===
Bacchus graduated with an Economics degree from Cambridge University, and, after a short period with the British Government, joined Price Waterhouse in 1992 in London.

=== Investment banking career ===
In 1995, Bacchus joined Robert Fleming & Co, which was acquired by Chase Manhattan Bank in 2000, and shortly thereafter merged with JP Morgan. Bacchus became a director in the M&A team at JP Morgan.

Between 2000 and 2006, Bacchus worked at Salomon Brothers, Inc., which was owned by Citigroup and became Citigroup’s Global Markets division. Bacchus was appointed Co-Head of Asia-Pacific Diversified Industrials and Head of Mining and Metals, Australia, Asia & Africa at Citigroup. Bacchus managed many of Citigroup's metals and mining transactions in Asia and Australia. In 2004, Bacchus acted as a strategic advisor to Chinese state-owned MinMetals on its attempted acquisition of Canada's Noranda. In 2005, Bacchus was defence adviser to WMC against an unsolicited offer from Xstrata and ultimately its sale to BHP. The deal was Australia's largest cash offer at the time, valued at US$7.7 billion. Bacchus was responsible for advising Fortescue Metals, helping secure US$2.5 billion in financing in 2006 to build strategic port, rail, and mine infrastructure in Western Australia.

In 2006, Bacchus moved to Morgan Stanley in London and became Managing Director in Morgan Stanley’s Global Basic Materials Group and Global Head of Metals and Mining investment banking activities. During this period, Bacchus acted as a defence adviser to Rio Tinto in relation to the unsolicited pre-conditional offer from BHP. The deal was valued at US$147.4 billion and was the largest ever proposed transaction in the mining sector at the time.

In 2011, Bacchus moved to Jefferies as Joint Head of European Investment Banking and Global Head of Metals and Mining Investment Banking. At Jefferies, Bacchus advised First Quantum Minerals on its C$5.1 billion hostile public takeover of Inmet in 2013, which created one of the biggest global producers of copper at the time. Bacchus also oversaw the bank's acquisition of the Hoare Govett corporate broking franchise.

In 2016, Bacchus stepped down from his positions as Global Head of Metals and Mining and Co-Head of European Investment Banking to establish an independent advisory and ventures firm, Bacchus Capital Advisers Limited (“BCA”).

=== Bacchus Capital Advisers ===
Bacchus is Chairman and Chief Executive of BCA, an investment and merchant banking firm. Bacchus founded BCA with: Richard Allan, former Managing Director and European Head of Mining and Metals at Jefferies, with whom he had worked with since Ord Minnett; Chris Johannsen, former Head of Mining and Metals Advisory – EMEA at Standard Chartered; and Paul Cahill, former Group Head of Business Development and Head of Strategic Relationships Management at Anglo American.

BCA has launched several companies under its ventures arm, including Yellow Cake plc, which it founded in 2017 as a uranium buy and hold vehicle to provide direct exposure to the price of physical uranium. Yellow Cake completed a US$200 million initial public offering in 2018 on the AIM sub-market of the London Stock Exchange, during which it purchased the equivalent of 5% of the global marketed uranium production in 2016. As of August 22, 2024, Yellow Cake holds 21.7 million pounds of uranium, and reached a market value of US$2 billion in the financial year ending 31 March 2024.

In November 2021, BCA founded the environmental carbon company, Green 14, in partnership with African conservation charity, Space for Giants. Green 14 focuses on restoring and protecting landscapes in Africa by creating carbon credits from conservation.

In December 2022, BCA established BG Gold to acquire Northquest and the Whale Cove project, formerly known as the Pistol Bay project, in Nunavut, Northern Canada. The Whale Cove project is a gold exploration project covering 842 km² with 2.4 million ounces of gold on the west coast of Hudson Bay.

=== Board roles ===
Between 2014 and 2017, Bacchus served on the board of Nordgold as a Non-Executive Director and Chairman of the audit committee. Nordgold was an international gold producer operating a portfolio of mines located in Russia, Kazakhstan, Burkina Faso, and Guinea.

In 2016, Bacchus was appointed a Non-Executive Director of Gold Fields, a NYSE and Johannesburg listed international gold producer. Bacchus currently serves as chair of the Strategy and M&A Committee and chair of the Risk Committee.

From 2017 to 2021, Bacchus served as a Non-Executive Director of Kenmare Resources, an LSE-listed mineral sands producer with operations in Mozambique, acting as Chair of the Nominations Committee and as a Senior Independent Director.

From 2017-2021, Bacchus served as Non-Executive Director of ASX-listed Galaxy Resources, a lithium producer with assets in Australia, Canada, and Argentina, stepping down at that company's merger with Orocobre in 2021 to form Allkem.

In July 2021, Bacchus became Non-Executive Director of Trident Royalties, an AIM-listed diversified mining royalty company, before being appointed as Non-Executive Chairman in May 2024 until the completion of the acquisition of Trident Royalties by Deterra Royalties.

Additionally, Bacchus serves as a Director, and former Chair, of the Africa-focused conservation charity, Space for Giants, which launched Green 14 with BCA. Bacchus has also served as the Chairman of 308 Services since 2017 and BG Gold since its establishment in 2022. Since September 2024, Bacchus is Non-Executive Director of Apex Royalties, a diversified mining royalty company.

Bacchus is also an adviser to the Board of Skylark Minerals, which in November 2024 brought in a new CEO, former CEO of Nordgold Nikolai Zelenski, and recapitalised the company.
