= Concierto mágico =

Concierto mágico (English: Magic Concerto) may refer to:

- Magic Concert, a Spanish musical film by Rafael J. Salvia
- Concierto mágico (Balada), a concerto for guitar by Spanish composer Leonardo Balada
