= Music for Flute and Orchestra =

Classical piece with Catalan folk elements

Music for Flute and Orchestra is a classical work by Catalan composer Leonardo Balada, composed in 2000. This work was commissioned by the Carnegie Mellon University, and the first recording of the work can be found in the Naxos catalogue. This piece has plenty of Catalan folk elements and belong to the composer's avant-garde period.

== Structure ==
This piece is in two movements, each one of them lasting for ten minutes approximately. The composer did not write a title for either of the movements, so the number within the work is considered the title. According to the author of this work, the first movement is slow; the flute plays a mysterious melody after a short introduction from the orchestra. The second movement is written for a virtuoso soloist, while the orchestra plays a dance in the background.
