= Kongsberg Offshore =

- Formerly: Kongsberg Oil
- Industry: Petroleum
- Founded: 1978 in Kongsberg, Norway
- Defunct: 1987
- Fate: Divested
- Products: Oil & Gas
- Parent: Kongsberg Våpenfabrikk

With the discovery of the Ekofisk oil field in the early 1970s in the Norwegian sector of the North Sea, the Norwegian government sought to establish an undersea technology industry in Norway. In 1974, Kongsberg Våpenfabrikk established an oil division in the city of Kongsberg, Norway. The first project for the oil division was begun in 1978 and delivered to Elf in 1980. In 1986 Kongsberg Oil was renamed Kongsberg Offshore. In 1987, the Norwegian state divested itself of all Kongsberg industries not related to weapons manufacture, selling Kongsberg Offshore to Siemens A.S. In 1993, FMC Corp purchased Kongsberg Offshore from Siemens.
