= Quebec Lithium Mine =

Lithium mine in Quebec, Canada

Quebec Lithium Mine was a lithium mine in Quebec, Canada. The deposit was discovered in 1942 by Georges H. Dumont.

This mine was located 12 miles west of Barraute and 25 miles north west of Val-D'Or, Quebec.

At the beginning, Quebec Lithium had a five-year contract with Lithium Corporation of America for concentrates of Li_{2}O (at 5 and 6%). Lithium Corporation of America was selling back this concentrate to the Atomic Energy Commission. When the United States government ceased to buy lithium, Quebec Lithium became unable to sell its lithium concentrate to Lithium Corporation of America. The company then built its own facilities (in October 1960) to produce lithium carbonate and later on, some lithium hydroxide for domestic usage. A certain kind of spodumen was sent to Kimble Glass at Columbus, Ohio for making glass. From 1959 on, this mine operated only on a periodic basis. Following a strike in October 1965 and due to the lack of sufficient market, the decision to close was taken in December 1966.

Québec Lithium Mine was owned by the Beauchemin family of Montréal who owned the Sullivan Group of Companies. These included the Sullivan Mine in Sullivan, near Val d'Or, Québec and also East Sullivan, just east of Val d'Or, Québec along with other properties. The construction of the Québec Lithium property was under the direction of Harty S. Bérubé, a mining engineer and graduate of Massachusetts Institute of Technology (MIT). Construction began around 1953 and the mine began operation in 1955. The mine site was composed of a Bunkhouse and Cookhouse managed by Crawley-McCracken and there were some eighteen homes on the site. There was also a small school and the teacher in charge was a certain Mrs. Adams who taught in French to some two dozen students from grades one through grade nine. She also taught fifth grade in English to one student.

Harty S. Bérubé directed the construction of the mine and was the first General Manager of Québec Lithium.
