= Mt Cattlin mine =

Mine in Western Australia

- Location in Western Australia
- Interactive map of Mt Cattlin mine
- Location: Ravensthorpe, Western Australia, Western Australia, Australia; 33°33′45.1″S 120°2′6.7″E
- Products: Spodumene concentrate
- Opened: 2009
- Company: Arcadium Lithium
- Website: arcadiumlithium.com/operations-projects/

The Mt Cattlin mine is a spodumene-tantalite mine 2.2 kilometres (1.4 mi) north of Ravensthorpe, Western Australia. In 2019 the mine had a reserve of 8.2 million tonnes (18 billion pounds) of ore grading 1.29% Li_{2}O and 155 ppm Ta_{2}O_{5}.

== History ==
The mine was operated by Galaxy Resources between 2009 and 2012 before being placed on care-and-maintenance in 2013. Mine production restarted on 31 March 2016 with a 17-year mine life at a rate of 800 thousand tonnes (1.8 billion pounds) of ore per year. In January 2017 the first shipment of 10 thousand tonnes (22 million pounds) of lithium concentrate was consigned from Esperance to Lianyungang, China. Following a decrease in lithium prices in 2024, the mine was once again placed on care-and-maintenance, with operations to be suspended by mid-2025.
