= Technip =

Company in project management, engineering, and construction for the energy industry

Technip S.A.
- Company type: Société Anonyme
- Industry: Engineering
- Founded: 1958; 68 years ago
- Defunct: 17 January 2017; 9 years ago
- Fate: Merged with FMC Technologies
- Successor: TechnipFMC
- Headquarters: Paris, France
- Key people: Doug Pferdehirt (CEO); Thierry Pilenko (Executive Chairman)
- Products: Project management, engineering and construction for the energy industry
- Revenue: ▲€10.7 billion (end 2014)
- Operating income: ▼€825 million (end 2014)
- Net income: ▼€437 million (end 2014)
- Total assets: ▲€14.6 billion (end 2014)
- Total equity: ▲€4.4 billion (end 2014)
- Number of employees: 37,500 (July 2015)

Technip S.A. was a company that carried out project management, engineering and construction for the energy industry; in 2017 it completed a merger with FMC Technologies to form TechnipFMC. Its headquarters were in the 16th arrondissement of Paris. It has about 38,000 employees and operates in 48 countries.

== Overview ==
TechnipFMC is primarily in the energy business and is active in three business segments, namely Subsea, Offshore & Onshore. It has around 38,000 employees and operates in 48 countries. It owns a fleet of 21 vessels in operation with 6 more under construction. As of the end of 2014, while the operating income of Technip Group from recurring activities stood at ~ Euros 825 million, the total revenues stood at more than Euros 10.7 billion.

== History ==
Technip head office, 89 Avenue de la Grande-Armée, Paris 16th arr.

Technip was established in 1958 by IFP, Institut français du pétrole, as Compagnie française d'études et de construction Technip.

In the 1960s, the company completed its first international projects in Africa and Asia. In the 1970s Technip became an international group with the acquisition of an office in Rome and the creation of Technip Geoproduction, a subsidiary specialized in hydrocarbon field equipment. During this period, Coflexip – a firm specialized in the design, manufacture, and supply of flexible subsea flowlines – was created by the IFP (French Petroleum Institute) and opened a flexible flowline manufacturing plant in Le Trait, France, as well as offices in Houston, Aberdeen and Rio de Janeiro.

In the 1980s Technip opened operating centers in Kuala Lumpur and Abu Dhabi. Coflexip opened a second flowline manufacturing plant in Brazil and branched out into the manufacture of umbilicals with the establishment of the Duco plant in Newcastle, UK.

Coflexip acquired Stena Offshore while Technip acquired several companies with strong technological expertise: Speichim, Krebs and KTI. Already established in the United States, KTI enabled Technip to set up in North America. Coflexip established a presence in Australia and acquired the Norwegian company Stena Offshore.

In the 2000s, Technip merged with Coflexip, which had just acquired Aker Maritime's Deepwater Division. The unified group is now one of the top five companies worldwide in engineering, technology, and services for the energy industry. Many major contracts are signed, notably in the Middle East in the liquefied natural gas (LNG), ethylene, and refining sectors.

In 2010 three major assets came into operation: the Technip fleet expanded to 17 vessels with the addition of the Apache II, one of the most advanced pipelay vessels in the industry, and the Skandi Vitoria, a Brazilian-flagged vessel dedicated to the pre-salt market. Asiaflex Products, the Group’s third flexible pipe production plant, located in Tanjung Langsat, Malaysia was inaugurated.

In 2011, Technip acquired Global Industries, substantially expanding its addressable market in subsea.

In 2012 Technip acquired Stone & Webster Process Technologies and associated oil and gas engineering capabilities from The Shaw Group.

== Merger with FMC ==
In 2017, FMC Technologies Inc. and Technip agreed to merge, forming a significant new player in an energy industry racked by a nearly two-year slump in crude prices.

The all-share deal would result in a new company named TechnipFMC with a market value of about $13 billion.

TechnipFMC has three headquarters in Houston, Paris, and London under new Houston-based CEO Doug Pferdehirt, who worked as FMC’s chief operating officer. Former Technip chairman and CEO Thierry Pilenko is the new executive chairman.

In August 2019, Doug Pferdehirt announces that TechnipFMC will be split into two independent engineering companies. The separation is expected to be completed by the end of the first semester of 2020. The former Technip entity, without the subsea business, was renamed Technip Energies.

== Listings ==
In the 1990s Technip was listed on the Paris Stock Exchange and Coflexip on the New York Stock Exchange. Technip was included in the CAC40 French benchmark index in September 2009.

== Controversies ==
In June 2010 Technip S.A. agreed to pay a $338 million criminal penalty to resolve charges related to the Foreign Corrupt Practices Act (FCPA) for its participation in a decade-long scheme to bribe Nigerian government officials to obtain engineering, procurement, and construction (EPC) contracts.

In 2011, the US Securities & Exchange Commission (SEC) filed a lawsuit in the federal Southern District of New York alleging insider trading.

== Organization ==
Technip was certified as one of the first five companies in the world as a Global Top-Employer 2015 which recognizes first-class employee offerings globally and equally. This independent certification delivered by the Top Employers Institute demonstrates the quality and consistency of the company’s human resources policies and practices all around the globe.

Technip has also been certified as a Top-Employer in 24 countries (Australia, Brazil, China, Colombia, France, Germany, India, Indonesia, Italy, Malaysia, Mexico, Netherlands, Norway, Portugal, Qatar, Russia, Singapore, Spain, Thailand, United Arab Emirates, United Kingdom, United States, Venezuela, and Vietnam) as well as in three regions (Asia-Pacific, Europe, and Latin America).

In July 2015, it was announced that the company would lay off 6,000 employees due to the industry downturn.

== Financial and stock market information ==
Key Figures in millions of €
Years	2006	2007	2008	2009	2010	2011	2012	2013	2014
Revenue	6,926.5	7,886.5	7,481.4	6,456.0	6,081.9	6,813.0	8,203.9	9,336.1	10,724.5
Operating income from recurring activities	333.2	247.0	656.9	676.7	620.3	709.5	821.7	844.5	825
Net income	201.9	128.0	454.3	170.4	417.6	507.3	539.7	563.1	436.6

The Technip share is listed on Euronext Paris and the American over-the-counter market.

- ISIN: FR0000131708
- Nominal value: euro

Years (at 12/31)	2008	2009	2010	2011	2012	2013	2014
Number of outstanding shares(in millions) (a)	109	109	110	111	113	113	114
Market capitalization (in € millions) (Figures at the closing trade date)	2,380	5,400	7,600	8,040	9,816	7,941	5,631

The Technip share is included in the Dow Jones Sustainability Index and the Low Carbon 100 index and the ASPI Eurozone.

(a) Does not include the exercise of options arising from the current share purchase or share subscription option plans.
