= Concierto mágico (Balada) =

1997 composition by Leonardo Balada

The Concierto mágico (Spanish: Magical Concerto) is a 1997 concerto for classical guitar and orchestra by Catalan composer Leonardo Balada. This concerto was commissioned by the Cincinnati Symphony Orchestra and the Hartford Symphony Orchestra and premiered on March 13, 1998 by Jesús López-Cobos with the Cincinnati Symphony Orchestra and with the virtuoso Angel Romero as soloist. This concerto is highly influenced by Spanish folk music.

== Structure ==
There are three movements in this concerto, titled as follows:

1. Sol
2. Luna
3. Duende

This concerto signifies a rupture between Balada's avant-garde period and his previous guitar concertos, because folk culture is much more present than in any other of his concertos. In the first movement, the orchestra tries to simulate the sonority and the rhythm of Spanish folk culture by imitating the pulse of clapping hands, typical in Spanish gypsy music. In some fragments, the melody played by the guitar has a Flamenco background, which Balada considers to be a "deviation from the instrument's identity". The second movement, as in his Piano Concerto No. 3, is a more obscure and mysterious movement, and all the voices in this piece are intended to create a mystic atmosphere. The third movement is a Spanish zapateado, which uses rhythmic structures in accordance to the rest of the concerto.
