= Galaxy Resources =

Former mining company

Galaxy Resources Limited
- Type: Public
- Traded as: ASX: GXY
- Industry: Mining
- Founded: 1996
- Headquarters: Applecross, Western Australia
- Key people: Martin Rowley (Chairman); Simon Hay (CEO); Alan Rule (CFO)
- Products: Spodumene concentrate at 6.0% Li_{2}O
- Production output: 191,570 tonnes (2019)
- Website: www.gxy.com

Galaxy Resources Limited was an Australian public mining company. It was listed on the Australian Securities Exchange until it merged with fellow lithium producer Orocobre in August 2021 to form Allkem.

== Operations ==
Galaxy Resources was a lithium mining company with projects in Australia, Canada and Argentina.

It owned and operated the Mt Cattlin spodumene-tantalite mine at Ravensthorpe, Western Australia. The mine operated between 2009 and 2012 before being placed on care-and-maintenance between 2013 and 2016. Following a plant refurbishment, mining at Mt Cattlin recommenced in March 2016, with first tantalum production in May 2016.

The Sal de Vida lithium brine project, located in Argentina's Salta and Catamarca provinces, and the James Bay Lithium Pegmatite Project in James Bay, Quebec, Canada are at a development stage.

In May 2016, Galaxy announced a merger with its joint venture partner in the Mt Caitlin mine, General Mining Corporation.

Galaxy sold a northern package of tenements on the Hombre Muerto salar to South Korean conglomerate POSCO for US$280 million in 2018. The sale allowed the company to maintain its original proven and probable reserves of 1.14 million tonnes LCE (Lithium Carbonate Equivalent). The measured and indicated resource as at 2016 was 5.67 million tonnes LCE.

The company merged with fellow lithium producer Orocobre in August 2021. The resulting company was branded Allkem.

== See also ==
- Lithium mining in Australia
