= FMC Corporation (Fridley Plant) =

Coordinates: 45°3′3″N 93°16′30″W

The FMC Corporation (Fridley Plant) is a United States Environmental Protection Agency Superfund site of 18 acres (7.3 ha) in Anoka County, Minnesota, United States, several hundred feet east of the Mississippi River. Solvents, paint sludge, and plating wastes were generated and disposed of in an on-site dump from the 1940s until 1969. Minnesota Pollution Control Agency (MPCA) staff sampled site surface and groundwater in the early 1980s and confirmed that ground and surface water were contaminated by industrial solvents. In the 1980s, solvents from the site were detected in the city of Minneapolis drinking water system intake that is located downgradient of where the FMC site groundwater contaminant plume enters the river.

To address this, the Minneapolis surface water intake was moved further downstream and into the center of the river. Regular sampling of the water from the intake has shown no exceedances of contaminants since the 1980s. Because of the threat posed to Minneapolis drinking water, this site received one of the highest Hazard Ranking System (HRS) scores of all sites on the Superfund National Priorities List (NPL). However, that threat was mitigated by relocating the intake. Cleanup work at the FMC site was initiated in the 1980s, and the groundwater extraction wells that were installed as part of the remedy have been in operation since that time.

== Threats and contaminants ==
FMC site groundwater is contaminated with volatile organic compounds (VOCs) including trichloroethylene (TCE). Soil that was excavated in the 1980s was also contaminated with TCE. The main health risk at the FMC site would be if someone were to use contaminated groundwater as a drinking water supply. TCE believed to be from the site was detected in high concentrations in groundwater wells located near the Mississippi River and is believed to have contributed to the detection of VOCs in the Minneapolis drinking water supply intake in the 1980s. However, the surface water intake was moved further downstream and no exceedances of VOCs have been detected in the intake since that time. In addition, because no private drinking water wells are in the area, no residents are directly exposed to the contaminants in the site groundwater.

== Cleanup progress ==
The soil cleanup at the FMC site and installation of groundwater extraction wells were completed between 1983 and 1987. In addition to storing contaminated soil in an on-site vault, the cleanup also included pumping contaminated groundwater and transporting it to a nearby treatment plant. Routine monitoring of groundwater began in 1987 and continues to this day. Although concentrations of VOCs in groundwater have decreased in most monitoring wells, pumping will continue until cleanup goals have been met.

Because contamination still exists on the site, by law, the remedy must be reviewed every five years to ensure that it is still protective. Five-year reviews were completed by MPCA in 1999, 2004 and 2009. The next review will be conducted in 2014. No issues with the remedy's short-term protectiveness have been identified in any of the five-year reviews. The remedy continues to be protective of public health and the environment.

== Property reuse ==
The site continues to be used as a manufacturing facility operated by BAE Systems. In 2009, BAE installed 16 solar panels on the site to provide electricity. The panels provide 30 percent of the electrical energy for the remediation system on the south side of the site. The amount of energy produced per year would supply enough power for four average sized homes. The use of solar energy at the FMC site prevents 41,000 pounds of carbon dioxide from being produced and emitted into the air.
