= No-res =

No-res, a Symphonic Tragedy in Two Parts (Catalan: Nothing, una tragèdia simfònica en dues parts), also known as No-res, an Agnostic Requiem (Catalan: Nothing, un rèquiem agnòstic) is a cantata for choir, orchestra, narrator and magnetic tape by Barcelonan composer Leonardo Balada. This work was finished on 1974 and represents a soundscape in which the composer recreates the relationship between himself and his mother when the latter was dying, to whom the work is dedicated. The lyrics were written exclusively for this composition by French poet Jean Paris. This is one of the most relevant works from the avant-garde period of Balada.

This work was premiered on 1997 in Barcelona by the Barcelona Symphony and Catalonia National Orchestra, together with the Coro Nacional de España, and conducted by Lawrence Foster.

== Structure ==
This work is written in two parts, which represent the only two movements of this piece. A typical performance of this work should last for about 40 minutes.

- Part I
- Part II

In the first movement, the narrator describes death, not only from its tragic side, but also from a metaphysical point of view. The text contains quotes by many authors around the world, in different languages, such as Catalan, Spanish, French, English, and Italian, with the purpose of stating that death is universal. At the very beginning of the first part, the composer uses the tape of a wolf howling, while the choir tries to imitate its sound. All along the first movement, the author creates a mixture between tonal fragments and atonal fragments, with the intention of representing death in its bleakest aspect, that is to say, death is unavoidable, and there is no hope for us to dodge it. Then he randomly plays sounds of smashing glass, trees swaying and other types of sounds made by animals. According to Balada: "un sinnúmero de animales contribuyen con sus ruidos innatos a la sensación de absurdidad que es el fatal curso de nuestra existencia" (a great number of animals contribute with their innate sounds to the sensation of absurdity that is the fatal course of our existence). Towards the end of the first part, everybody on the stage should remain still, which symbolizes the end in all of its dimensions.

The second part of this piece is entirely written by Paris in English, though it is indicated that the text should be translated to the native language of the place where this piece is going to be played. In general terms, the same techniques are used, although the temperament of this movement is much more defiant and bright. The composer tries to represent the everlasting struggle against the undeniable truth, as well as he questions the existence of God or the fairness thereof.
