= Piano Concerto No. 3 (Balada) =

Piano concerto by Leonardo Balada

The Piano Concerto No. 3 is a piano concerto by the Catalan composer Leonardo Balada. It was finished in 1999 and the complete work premiered on 12 February 2000 by Rafael Frühbeck de Burgos with the Berlin Radio Symphony Orchestra and Rosa Torres-Pardo as soloist. This concerto is well known for its wealth of folk elements.

== Structure ==
This concerto is divided into three untitled movements. In the first movement, the composer uses elements from folk music of Spain, recreating a pasodoble, with a timbral arrangement that tries to imitate a street organ. The second movement evokes melodic textures that are similar to the music of Al-Andalus. In the third movement, the composer writes a jota aragonesa, a typical music genre from Aragon, in which Balada maintains the melodic structures from the first movement.
