= TechnipFMC =

U.K.-domiciled energy company

TechnipFMC plc
- Company type: Public limited company
- Traded as: NYSE: FTI; S&P 400 component
- ISIN: GB00BDSFG982
- Industry: Petroleum
- Predecessors: Technip; FMC Technologies
- Founded: 17 January 2017; 9 years ago
- Headquarters: Newcastle Upon Tyne, England (legal domicile); Houston, Texas (operational headquarters)
- Area served: Worldwide
- Key people: Douglas Pferdehirt (CEO)
- Products: Offshore, subsea Project management, engineering, procurement & construction for the energy industry
- Revenue: ▼US$6.7 billion (2022)
- Operating income: ▼US$219.6 million (2022)
- Net income: ▲US$–61.9 million (2022)
- Number of employees: 23,000
- Website: www.technipfmc.com

TechnipFMC plc is a French-American, UK-domiciled global oil and gas company that provides services for the energy industry. The company was formed by the merger of FMC Technologies of the United States and Technip of France that was announced in 2016 and completed in 2017.

TechnipFMC acts in three distinct segments: subsea, offshore, and surface projects. These projects include offshore oil and gas exploration and extraction platforms/rigs. The company is legally domiciled in the UK, and has major operations in Houston and Paris where its predecessor companies were headquartered. It has about 23,000 employees from 126 nationalities and operates in 48 countries. TechnipFMC stock is listed on the NYSE, and is a component of the Russell 1000 Index and the Dow Jones Sustainability Index.

== History ==
TechnipFMC was formed through the merger of FMC Technologies Inc. and French oil-services Technip SA. On January 17, 2017, TechnipFMC announced that it is operating as a unified company after completion of the merger, which created a significant new player in an energy industry wracked by a nearly two-year slump in crude prices. The company has three headquarters in Houston, Paris, and London. The CEO is Doug Pferdehirt and the executive chairman is Thierry Pilenko. TechnipFMC also provides consulting and technology business through its two subsidiaries, PT and Genesis. Through 2016-2017 the TechnipFMC fleet expanded with the addition of four pipe-laying vessels (PLSVs) constructed under the DOF-Technip partnership, two foreign (Skandi Açu and Skandi Buzios) and two Brazilian (Skandi Olinda and Skandi Recife). Another ship who entered operations was the Deep Explorer, one of the most advanced diving support vessels (DSV) in the world.

In August 2019, Doug Pferdehirt announced that TechnipFMC will be split into two independent engineering companies. The separation is expected to be completed by the end of the first semester 2020. The former Technip entity, without the subsea business, was renamed Technip Energies. On March 15, 2020, the group announced the suspension of the spin-off due to market conditions in the context of the COVID-19 pandemic. In February 2021, the spin-off was completed.

== Recent projects ==
- Yamal LNG, Russia
- Prelude FLNG, Australia
- Statoil Trestakk Oil Field Development, Norway
- Coral South FLNG Project, Offshore Mozambique
- Sulphate Reduction Plant, Abu Dhabi, UAE
- Liza Deep Water Project, Guyana
- Kaikias Deep Water Project, Gulf of Mexico
- Sankofa Field Development, Ghana
- Riserless light Well Intervention services, Ichthys Field, Australia
- Integrated Development of Vashishta (VA) & S1 fields, Andhra Pradesh, India
- Slurry Oil Filtration System for Fluid Catalytic Cracking Unit

== Fleet of vessels ==
TechnipFMC owns and operates 21 vessels and 4 are under construction. These large vessels are used for installation of subsea oil extraction systems on the seabed. They are of four categories.

Flexible-lay & Construction vessels:

- Deep Orient
- Skandi Africa
- North Sea Atlantic
- Deep Star

Diving & multi support vessels:

- Deep Arctic
- Deep Explorer
- Deep Discoverer

Rigid S-Lay & heavy lift vessels:

- Global 1200

Rigid Reel-lay & J-Lay vessels:

- Apache II
- Deep Blue
- Deep Energy

== Manufacturing plants ==
TechnipFMC designs and manufactures umbilical cable and flexible pipes. It has flexible pipe manufacturing plants in France, Brazil and Malaysia. It operates umbilical production facilities in the UK, United States, Angola, Singapore, Brazil and Malaysia. TechnipFMC built a Modular Manufacturing Yard at Dahej in the Gujarat state of India in 2017.

== Controversies ==
In 2010, the company's Paris-based predecessor (Technip) was fined $240 million for paying bribes to win contracts to build a liquefied-natural-gas plant in Nigeria.

In June 2019, TechnipFMC agreed to pay around US$300 million to resolve allegations it bribed government officials in Iraq (FMC) and Brazil, including at the country's state-controlled oil-and-gas company Petróleo Brasileiro S.A., also known as Petrobras.

== See also ==
- List of oilfield service companies
