= FMC Technologies =

Houston-based company

FMC Technologies Inc.
- Company type: Public company
- Industry: Oil and Gas Equipment, Services
- Predecessor: Food Machinery Corporation
- Founded: 2001
- Defunct: 17 January 2017; 9 years ago
- Fate: Merged with Technip and became TechnipFMC
- Successor: TechnipFMC
- Headquarters: Houston, Texas, USA
- Key people: Thierry Pilenko Executive Chairman; Douglas Pferdehirt CEO
- Products: Subsea production and processing systems Surface wellhead systems Fluid control equipment Measurement solutions Marine loading systems
- Number of employees: 17,400 (December 2015)
- Website: www.technipfmc.com

FMC Technologies, Inc. was a North American company that produced equipment for the exploration and production of hydrocarbons. FMC Technologies was incorporated in 2000 when FMC Corporation divested its machinery businesses. It exists today as a part of TechnipFMC, after a merge with Technip in 2017.

== History ==
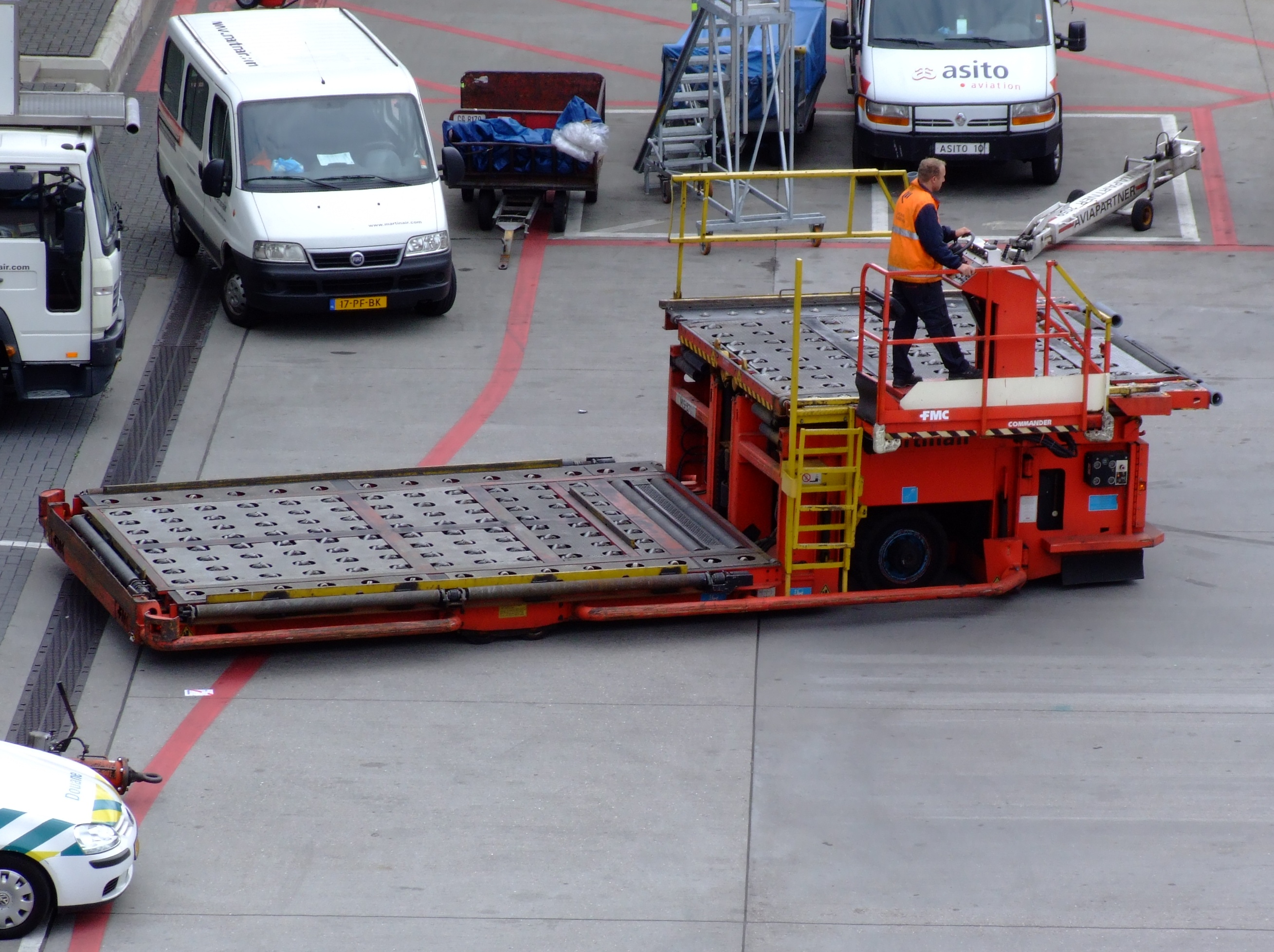
FMC Commander Aircraft cargo loader

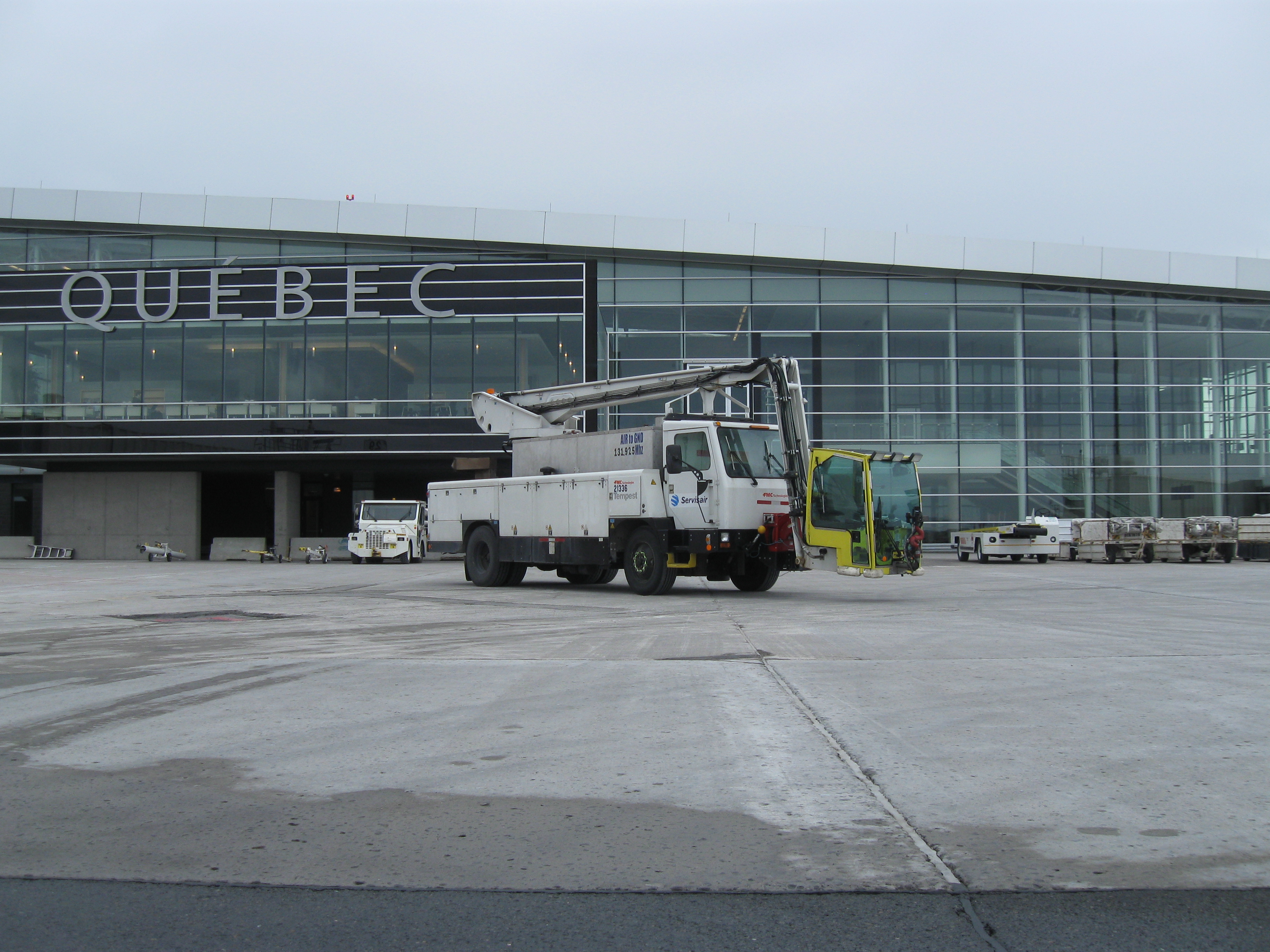
A FMC Technologies' Tempest deicing unit on an airport tarmac.

FMC Technologies was a provider of systems and solutions for the oil and gas industry. The company was divided into three business areas: Subsea Technologies, Surface Technologies and Energy Infrastructures. FMC Technologies designed, manufactured and serviced systems and products such as subsea production and processing systems, surface wellhead systems, high pressure pumps and fluid control equipment, measurement solutions and marine loading systems. In 1993, it acquired the Norwegian company Kongsberg Offshore from Siemens.

FMC Technologies originally existed for decades as a division of Food Machinery Corporation, or FMC. The division's transition into a distinct business entity began in 2000, when FMC announced plans to restructure itself into two separate, publicly traded companies - a machinery business (FMC Technologies) and a chemicals business (FMC Corporation). FMC Technologies, Inc. began trading on the New York Stock Exchange on June 14, 2001. In 2008, FMC Technologies spun off its FoodTech and Airport businesses into a new, independent, publicly traded company called JBT Corporation. In 2009, the company acquired Multi Phase Meters (MPM), a Norwegian technology company that provides advanced instrumentation for the oil industry.

In 2014, FMC Technologies divested its Material Handling Products business to Syntron Material Handling, LLC, an affiliate of Levine Leichtman Capital Partners.

Globally, FMC Technologies had approximately 17,400 employees by 2015, consisting of approximately 5,700 in the United States and 11,700 in non-U.S. locations. The company had a total of 30 locations in 16 countries, including the United States, Norway, Brazil, Scotland, Singapore, Australia, Poland, Russia, India, Angola and Nigeria. Its headquarters were located in northern Houston, Texas. In Norway there were about 3800 employees, working at locations in Kongsberg, Asker, Bergen, Stavanger, Kristiansund, Floro and Notodden. On October 1, 2012, the company acquired Pure Energy Services. In the same year, FMC Technologies was named by Fortune (magazine) as the World's Most Admired Oil and Gas Equipment, Service Company.

On May 19, 2016, it was announced that FMC Technologies would team up with French Technip to create a new company called TechnipFMC. After the approval of regulatory authorities, TechnipFMC began operating as a unified company in Jan 17, 2017. The all-share deal resulted in a company with a market value of about $13 billion.

== Leadership ==
Douglas Pferdehirt was Chairman and CEO of FMC Technologies, Inc.
