= Allkem =

Australian mining company

Allkem Limited
- Formerly: Orocobre
- Type: Subsidiary
- Traded as: ASX: AKE
- Industry: Mining
- Defunct: 2024
- Fate: Merged with Livent to form Arcadium Lithium
- Successor: Arcadium Lithium
- Headquarters: Brisbane, Australia
- Products: Lithium Carbonate and Boron
- Revenue: USD 769 million (2022)
- Net income: USD 305 million (2022)
- Parent: Arcadium Lithium
- Website: www.allkem.co

Allkem Limited, known as Orocobre Limited until 30 November 2021, is an Australian mining company. Allkem's portfolio includes lithium brine operations in Argentina, a hard-rock lithium operation in Australia and a lithium hydroxide conversion facility in Japan. Allkem was cross-listed on the Australian Securities Exchange and Toronto Stock Exchange. In May 2023, Allkem agreed terms to merge with Livent. In January 2024, Allkem and Livent merged to form Arcadium Lithium.

== Projects ==
=== Salar de Olaroz ===
The Salar de Olaroz is a salt lake in the province of Jujuy in northwestern Argentina, close to the Chilean border. The project consists of 63,000 hectares of tenements over a salar known to contain high values of lithium and potash in brine. In October 2012, Orocobre and Toyota Tsusho Corporation (TTC) executed a definitive joint venture agreement to develop the Olaroz Lithium Project. Earlier in the year, in June 2012, Orocobre had entered into an agreement with Jujuy Energia y Mineria Sociedad del Estado (JEMSE), a mining investment company owned by the provincial Government of Jujuy, whereby JEMSE will hold an equity interest in the Olaroz project and in return provide assistance during its development.

Results from a definitive feasibility study (DFS) released May 3, 2011 suggest that the Olaroz project has a large resource base of 6.5 million tonnes of lithium carbonate equivalent with a project mine life estimated at 40 years. The design capacity of the Olaroz operation has been increased to 17,500 tonnes per annum (tpa) of battery grade lithium carbonate, from 16,400 tpa originally provided for in the DFS. Expected potash recovery has also been increased to approximately 20,000 tpa compared to 10,000 tpa. Potash operations are not currently included in the immediate project plans or economics at this time, but are said to be considered in future development phases.

=== Mt Cattlin ===
The open-pit mine and concentrator is located approximately two kilometres north of Ravensthorpe in the Great Southern region of Western Australia. Operations recommenced at Mt Cattlin in late 2016, producing high-quality spodumene concentrate that is qualified in the lithium supply chain globally.

Mt Cattlin is a low-cost spodumene producer utilising conventional techniques to extract and process the resource.

=== Naraha ===
The Naraha Lithium Hydroxide Plant (Naraha), the first of its kind to be built in Japan, is designed to convert primary grade lithium carbonate feedstock into purified battery grade lithium hydroxide. The lithium carbonate feedstock of ~9,500tpa will be shipped from Olaroz.

Allkem has a 75% economic interest in the Toyotsu Lithium Corporation (TLC) joint venture with partner Toyota Tsusho Corporation (TTC) who retains operational control.

=== Sal de Vida ===
The tier 1 brine project is located in Catamarca Province on the Salar del Hombre Muerto, ~1,400km northwest of Buenos Aires, Argentina and ~200km from Allkem's flagship Olaroz Lithium Facility. Catamarca is a proven mining jurisdiction, home to several successful mining operations and development projects.

Sal de Vida is a globally recognized project with brine chemistry that readily upgrades to battery grade lithium carbonate.

=== James Bay ===
Located in northern Québec, approximately 130 km east of James Bay and the Cree Nation of Eastmain community. Québec is a highly attractive investment destination for lithium production due to its supportive resource development sector, access to skilled labour and its proximity to high-growth electric vehicle markets in North America and Europe.

Allkem is proposing to develop the James Bay Project as a sustainable, hard-rock operation, maximising the usage of renewable energy and utilising spodumene expertise gained from its successful Australian operation, Mt Cattlin.

=== Cauchari ===
The Salar de Cauchari lithium-potash resource, owned by South American salar Minerals Pty Ltd, has over 30,000 ha in Jujuy province immediately south of the Olaroz Project. The Cauchari project has similar geo-chemical characteristics to the Olaroz resource and provides a nearby additional brine source for future expansions of the planned Olaroz production facility at relatively low incremental capital cost.

=== Borax Argentina ===
Orocobre acquired Borax Argentina S.A. (Borax Argentina), a long established Argentine boron (or borate) minerals and refined chemicals producer, in August 2012 from Rio Tinto. Borax Argentina owns one of only a few important borate deposits globally that are in production.

Borax Argentina operate three open pit mines in Tincalayu, Sijes, and Porvenir located within the Jujuy and Salta Province in Northern Argentina. Borate mining operations have been undertaken in the area for over 50 years with a recent announcement by Ororocbre suggesting a positive outlook for future mining operation with the presence of long-life high quality ore reserves.

Currently, Borax Argentina's operations produce a variety of boron chemical products, including boric acid, borax decahydrate, borax pentahydrate, anhydrous borax and boroglas from concentrates and ulexite minerals carted from the mines and concentrators. In addition, the mine and concentrator at Sijes produce mineral concentrates for direct sale.

On 1 July 2013 Orocobre announced the relocation of the borax chemical plant from its location in Campo Quijano (close to the city of Salta) to the Tincalayu mine site. The relocation of the borax chemical plant is said to have significant financial benefits for the company through a reduction of both operating and logistics cost. The relocation project is said to be completed by the end of June 2014 within a budget cost of US$3.7m.

In December 2022 Allkem Limited completed the sale of Borax Argentina to Golden Wattle Springs and has acquired the María Victoria lithium tenement from Minera Santa Rita.
