= Lithium Corporation of America =

Coordinates: 35°17′N 81°17′W

- Revenue: $19 Million
- Number of employees: 35

Lithium Corporation of America was a mining company which mined lithium-bearing spodumene and pegmatite ores near Bessemer City, Gaston County, North Carolina, United States and in the Black Hills of South Dakota.

In 1954, economist Armen Alchian used sudden increases in the stock price of Lithium Corporation to deduce that the new American h-bomb used lithium in its fusion fuel; this result was one of the first "event studies".

In September 1959, Lithium Corporation of America was sued for breach of contract by a Canadian producer of lithium concentrate, Quebec Lithium Corporation, from which it had been buying lithium concentrate.

In 1985, Lithium Corporation of America was acquired by FMC Corporation, formerly known as Food Machinery and Chemical Corporation. At the time it was acquired, the company was the world's largest producer of lithium. FMC's lithium operations were known as FMC Lithium. In 2019 FMC completed the spin-off of its lithium operations as a new company, Livent Corporation.
