= Málaga Philharmonic =

Málaga Philharmonic Orchestra
- Native name: Orquesta Filarmónica de Málaga
- Short name: OFM
- Former name: Orquesta Ciudad de Málaga (City Orchestra of Málaga)
- Founded: 1991
- Concert hall: Teatro Cervantes
- Principal conductor: Manuel Hernández-Silva
- Website: Malaga Philharmonic

The Málaga Philharmonic Orchestra (Spanish: Orquesta Filarmónica de Málaga 'OFM') is a Spanish orchestra based in Málaga. Founded in 1991, the Philharmonic plays regularly at the Teatro Cervantes in Málaga. Since 2014, its principal conductor has been Manuel Hernández-Silva.

== History ==
The Málaga Philharmonic Orchestra (Orquesta Filarmónica de Málaga) held its inaugural concert on 14 February 1991. The Málaga Town Council and the Regional Government of Andalusia collaborated to establish the Orquesta Ciudad de Málaga (City Orchestra of Málaga), reflecting the belief that Málaga deserved its own symphony orchestra.

The orchestra has hosted a distinguished roster of guest conductors, including Jesús López Cobos, Philippe Entremont, Juanjo Mena, Sergiu Comissiona, Rafael Frühbeck de Burgos, Antoni Ros-Marbà, Nicholas Milton, and Yoav Talmi to name but a few. The orchestra has received soloists, including Alicia de Larrocha, Plácido Domingo, Alfredo Kraus, Joaquín Achúcarro, Pinchas Zukerman, Montserrat Caballé, Ainhoa Arteta, Carlos Álvarez, Stefan Dohr, Hansjörg Schellenberger, Leonidas Kavakos, Nikolaj Znaider, Julian Rachlin, and Asier Polo.

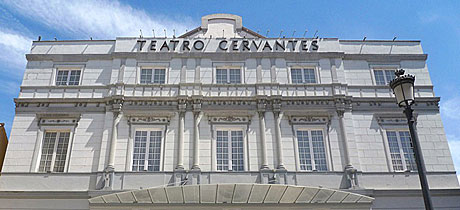
Teatro Cervantes in Málaga

The Málaga Philharmonic Orchestra has issued several CD recordings as a part of the Festival of Ancient Music and Cycle of Contemporary Music events. They have performed at several theaters and festivals throughout Spain, as well as touring Europe, including Sweden, Greece, Slovakia, Czech Republic and Germany.

== Principal conductors ==
- Octav Calleya (1991–1995)
- Odón Alonso (1995–1999)
- Alexander Rahbari (1999–2004)
- Aldo Ceccato (2004–2009)
- Edmon Colomer (2010–2013)
- Manuel Hernández-Silva (2014– )
