= Edmon Colomer =

Spanish conductor from Barcelona

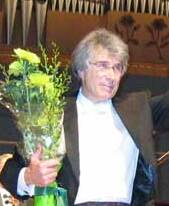
- Colomer in 2003
- Occupation: Conductor

Edmon Colomer is a Spanish conductor from Barcelona. He conducted Joaquín Rodrigo's Concierto de Aranjuez in 1991, in which Paco de Lucia performed with an orchestra. He has been director of the Orquesta Filarmónica de Málaga since September 2010. He has also directed the National Spanish Youth Orchestra. Sheldon Morganstern described Colomer as an "immensely gifted musician".
